= List of ships sunk by submarines by death toll =

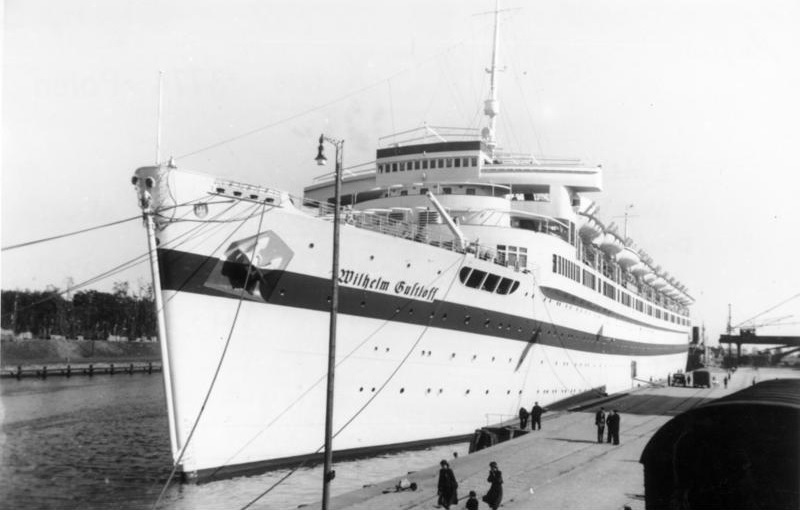
Heavy casualties occurred when submarines sank large passenger ships converted into military transports, such as the Wilhelm Gustloff, that were overloaded with soldiers, prisoners, or refugees.

While submarines were invented centuries ago, development of self-propelled torpedoes during the latter half of the 19th century dramatically increased the effectiveness of military submarines.

Initial submarine scouting patrols against surface warships sank several cruisers during the first month of World War I. Incidental submarine encounters with merchant ships were performed by signalling ships to stop, then sinking them after evacuation of the crew, in accordance with international law. After unrestricted submarine warfare began in February 1915, any ship could be sunk unexpectedly from the heavy underwater hull damage inflicted by torpedoes. Many large ships sank without their crews being able to alert friendly forces in time, and the submarines which sank them were too small to rescue more than a few survivors.

Many personnel casualties continued through World War II, and there have been a few later sinkings.

== List of ships sunk by submarines by death toll (exceeding 150) ==
Deaths	Name	Type	National affiliation	Date	Submarine	National affiliation
9,343	Wilhelm Gustloff	Cruise ship converted into a military transport serving as evacuation ship	Germany	30 January 1945	S-13	Soviet Union
6,500	Goya	Freighter converted into a troop transport serving as evacuation ship	Germany	16 April 1945	L-3	Soviet Union
5,620	Jun'yō Maru	Prisoner transport	Japan	18 September 1944	HMS Tradewind	United Kingdom
5,400	Toyama Maru	Troopship	Japan	29 June 1944	USS Sturgeon	United States
4,998	Ryūsei Maru	Troopship	Japan	24 February 1944	USS Rasher	United States
4,406-4,755	Tamatsu Maru	Landing craft carrier	Japan	19 August 1944	USS Spadefish	United States
3,608	General von Steuben	Ocean liner converted into a troop transport serving as evacuation ship	Germany	10 February 1945	S-13	Soviet Union
3,546	Mayasan Maru	Landing craft carrier	Japan	18 November 1944	USS Picuda	United States
3,219	Nikkin Maru	Troopship	Japan	30 June 1944	USS Tang	United States
3,000	Tango Maru	Prisoner transport	Japan	24 February 1944	USS Rasher	United States
2,765	Lima Maru	Troopship	Japan	8 February 1944	USS Snook	United States
2,670	Petrella	Prisoner transport	Germany	8 February 1944	HMS Sportsman	United Kingdom
2,665	Teia Maru	Troopship	Japan	19 August 1944	USS Rasher	United States
2,649	Yoshida Maru No. 1	Troopship	Japan	26 April 1944	USS Jack	United States
2,495	Yoshino Maru	Troopship	Japan	31 July 1944	USS Parche	United States
2,475	Sakito Maru	Troopship	Japan	1 March 1944	USS Trout	United States
2,246	Akitsu Maru	Landing craft carrier	Japan	14 November 1944	USS Queenfish	United States
2,134	Hawaii Maru	Troopship	Japan	2 December 1944	USS Sea Devil	United States
2,113	Edogawa Maru	Troopship	Japan	17 November 1944	USS Sunfish	United States
2,089	Dainichi Maru	Troopship	Japan	8 October 1943	USS Gurnard	United States
2,035	Kamakura Maru	Troopship	Japan	28 April 1943	USS Gudgeon	United States
2,008	Awa Maru	Ocean liner	Japan	1 April 1945	USS Queenfish	United States
2,000	Ural Maru	Ocean liner	Japan	27 September 1944	USS Flasher	United States
2,000	Salzburg	Transport ship serving as prisoner transport	Germany	1 October 1942	M-118	Soviet Union
1,934	Nichiren Maru	Troopship	Japan	16 March 1944	USS Tautog	United States
1,926	Principe Umberto	Troopship	Italy	8 June 1916	SM U-5	Austria-Hungary
1,773	Arisan Maru	Prisoner transport	Japan	24 October 1944	USS Snook or USS Shark	United States
1,747	Arabia Maru	Troopship	Japan	18 October 1944	USS Bluegill	United States
1,704	Denmark Maru	Troopship	Japan	16 January 1944	USS Whale	United States
1,658	Laconia	Ocean liner/Troopship	United Kingdom	12 September 1942	U-156	Germany
1,650	Taihō	Aircraft carrier	Japan	19 June 1944	USS Albacore	United States
1,602	Daisyō Maru	Troopship	Japan	26 October 1944	USS Drum	United States
1,576	Marei Maru	Troopship	Japan	25 January 1945	USS Silversides	United States
1,540	Kōshū Maru	Prisoner transport	Japan	4 August 1944	USS Ray	United States
1,539	Kenzui Maru	Troopship	Japan	23 December 1944	USS Blenny	United States
1,529	Tsushima Maru	Cargo liner serving as evacuation ship	Japan	22 August 1944	USS Bowfin	United States
1,471	Jinyō Maru	Troopship	Japan	7 December 1944	USS Trepang	United States
1,451	Hakuyo Maru	Troopship	Japan	25 October 1944	USS Seal	United States
1,450	Maebashi Maru	Troopship	Japan	30 September 1943	USS Pogy	United States
1,435	Shinano	Aircraft carrier	Japan	29 November 1944	USS Archerfish	United States
1,428	Shiranesan Maru	Troopship	Japan	19 October 1944	USS Raton	United States
1,400	Tatsuta Maru	Troopship	Japan	9 February 1943	USS Tarpon	United States
1,394	Mizuho Maru	Troopship	Japan	21 September 1944	USS Redfish	United States
1,384	Fuso Maru	Troopship	Japan	31 July 1944	USS Steelhead	United States
1,338	Gallia	Troopship	France	8 October 1916	SM U-35	Germany
1,310	Awata Maru	Troopship	Japan	22 October 1943	USS Grayback	United States
1,300	Ashigara	Heavy cruiser	Japan	8 June 1945	HMS Trenchant	United Kingdom
1,291	Conte Rosso	Troopship	Italy	24 May 1941	HMS Upholder	United Kingdom
1,279	Khedive Ismail	Troopship	United Kingdom	12 February 1944	I-27	Japan
1,273	Tsuyama Maru	Troopship	Japan	2 October 1944	USS Pomfret	United States
1,272	Shōkaku	Aircraft carrier	Japan	19 June 1944	USS Cavalla	United States
1,262	Nichiran Maru	Troopship	Japan	12 July 1944	USS Piranha	United States
1,250	Chūyō	Escort carrier	Japan	4 December 1943	USS Sailfish	United States
1,240	Unryū	Aircraft carrier	Japan	19 December 1944	USS Redfish	United States
1,197	Lusitania	Ocean liner	United Kingdom	7 May 1915	SM U-20	Germany
1,200	Takachiho Maru	Ocean liner	Japan	19 March 1943	USS Kingfish	United States
1,200	Kongō	Battleship or battlecruiser	Japan	21 November 1944	USS Sealion	United States
1,188	Yasukuni Maru	Troopship	Japan	24 January 1944	USS Trigger	United States
1,184	Rashin Maru	Troopship	Japan	8 August 1945	USS Pargo	United States
1,159	Rakuyo Maru	Prisoner transport	Japan	12 September 1944	USS Sealion	United States
1,130	Shinyo	Escort carrier	Japan	17 November 1944	USS Spadefish	United States
1,118	Hakozaki Maru	Ocean liner	Japan	19 March 1945	USS Balao	United States
1,073	Fukuyo Maru	Troopship	Japan	6 December 1944	USS Segundo	United States
1,053	Montevideo Maru	Prisoner transport	Japan	1 July 1942	USS Sturgeon	United States
995	Galilea	Troopship	Italy	28 March 1942	HMS Proteus	United Kingdom
956	Taihei Maru	Troopship	Japan	9 July 1944	USS Sunfish	United States
935	HMT Royal Edward	Troopship	United Kingdom	13 August 1915	SM UB-14	Germany
921	Città di Palermo	Armed merchant cruiser serving as troopship	Italy	5 January 1942	HMS Proteus	United Kingdom
930	La Provence	Troopship	France	26 February 1916	SM U-35	Germany
883	USS Indianapolis	Heavy cruiser	United States	30 July 1945	I-58	Japan
880	Verona	Troopship	Italy	11 May 1918	SM UC-52	Germany
870	Minas	Troopship	Italy	15 February 1917	SM U-39	Germany
866	Scillin	Cargo ship serving as POW ship	Italy	14 November 1942	HMS Sahib	United Kingdom
865	Arandora Star	Ocean liner serving as POW ship	United Kingdom	2 July 1940	U-47	Germany
862	HMS Barham	Battleship	United Kingdom	25 November 1941	U-331	Germany
856	Nova Scotia	Troopship/POW ship	United Kingdom	28 November 1942	U-177	Germany
856	Tenryō Maru	Troopship	Japan	29 May 1945	USS Sterlet	United States
846	Lisbon Maru	Prisoner transport	Japan	1 October 1942	USS Grouper	United States
819	Leopoldville	Troopship	Belgium	24 December 1944	U-486	Germany
817	Taiyō Maru	Ocean liner	Japan	8 May 1942	USS Grenadier	United States
810	Akane Maru	Troopship	Japan	6 October 1944	USS Whale	United States
800	Francesco Crispi	Troopship	Italy	19 April 1943	HMS Saracen	United Kingdom
786	HMS Royal Oak	Battleship	United Kingdom	14 October 1939	U-47	Germany
768	Struma	Motor schooner	Panama	24 February 1942	Shch-213	Soviet Union
754	Athos	Ocean liner	France	17 February 1917	SM U-65	Germany
747	Taiyō	Escort carrier	Japan	18 August 1944	USS Rasher	United States
740	Le Calvados	Troopship	France	4 November 1915	SM U-38	Germany
700	Shuntien	Coastal merchant ship serving as POW ship	United Kingdom	23 December 1941	U-559	Germany
688	Shinyō Maru	Prisoner transport	Japan	7 September 1944	USS Paddle	United States
686	Taisei Maru	Troopship	Japan	19 April 1945	USS Sunfish	United States
684	Léon Gambetta	Armored cruiser	France	27 April 1915	SM U-5	Austria-Hungary
683	USS Juneau	Anti-Air cruiser	United States	13 November 1942	I-26	Japan
675	Dorchester	Troopship	United States	3 February 1943	U-223	Germany
672	SMS Prinz Adalbert	Armored cruiser	Germany	23 October 1915	HMS E8	United Kingdom
668	Nikkō Maru	Passenger and cargo ship	Japan	9 April 1945	USS Tirante	United States
667	Taito Maru	Cargo ship serving as evacuation ship	Japan	22 August 1945	L-12	Soviet Union
658	Tateyama Maru	Troopship	Japan	1 March 1945	USS Sterlet	United States
656	Sanka Maru	Troopship	Japan	10 March 1945	USS Kete	United States
654	Ceramic	Ocean liner	United Kingdom	7 December 1942	U-515	Germany
648	Suffren	Pre-dreadnought battleship	France	26 November 1916	SM U-52	Germany
644	USS Liscombe Bay	Escort carrier	United States	24 November 1943	I-175	Japan
643	HMS Hampshire	Armored cruiser	United Kingdom	5 June 1916	SM U-75	Germany
638	Sant Anna	Troopship	France	11 May 1918	SM UC-54	Germany
638	Ogasawara Maru	Cable layer serving as evacuation ship	Japan	22 August 1945	L-12	Soviet Union
615	Suez Maru	Prisoner transport	Japan	29 November 1943	USS Bonefish	United States
611	Sidi-Bel-Abbès	Troopship	France	20 April 1943	U-565	Germany
610	HMT Aragon	Troopship	United Kingdom	30 December 1917	SM UC-34	Germany
599	America Maru	Ocean liner serving as evacuation ship	Japan	6 March 1944	USS Nautilus	United States
597	Pallada	Protected cruiser	Russia	11 October 1914	SM U-26	Germany
595	Tamahoko Maru	Prisoner transport	Japan	24 June 1944	USS Tang	United States
574	Nigitsu Maru	Landing craft carrier	Japan	12 January 1944	USS Hake	United States
570	Trento	Heavy cruiser	Italy	15 June 1942	HMS Umbra	United Kingdom
564	Leinster	Irish Sea Ferry	United Kingdom	10 October 1918	SM UB-123	Germany
562	HMS Cressy	Armored cruiser	United Kingdom	22 September 1914	SM U-9	Germany
555	Euterpe	Troopship	Austria-Hungary	11 August 1918	F 7	Italy
547	HMS Formidable	Pre-dreadnought battleship	United Kingdom	1 January 1915	SM U-24	Germany
544	Konron Maru	Troopship	Japan	5 October 1943	USS Wahoo	United States
527	HMS Aboukir	Armored cruiser	United Kingdom	22 September 1914	SM U-9	Germany
526	HMS Hawke	Protected cruiser	United Kingdom	15 October 1914	SM U-9	Germany
523	Aden Maru	Troopship	Japan	6 May 1944	USS Gurnard	United States
518	HMS Courageous	Aircraft carrier	United Kingdom	17 September 1939	U-29	Germany
514	HMS Avenger	Escort carrier	United Kingdom	15 November 1942	U-155	Germany
503	Nankin Maru	Troopship	Japan	17 March 1945	USS Spot	United States
500~	Rooseboom	Troopship	Netherlands	1 March 1942	I-59	Japan
497	Tembien	Cargo ship serving as POW ship	Italy	27 February 1942	HMS Upholder	United Kingdom
488	Kachidoki Maru	Prisoner transport	Japan	12 September 1944	USS Pampanito	United States
484	Yoma	Troopship	United Kingdom	17 June 1943	U-81	Germany
484	Armando Diaz	Light cruiser	Italy	25 February 1941	HMS Upright	United Kingdom
470	HMS Galatea	Light cruiser	United Kingdom	14 December 1941	U-557	Germany
461	Ikoma Maru	Prisoner transport	Japan	20 January 1944	USS Seahorse	United States
452	Kenjo Maru	Troopship	Japan	7 December 1944	USS Razorback	United States
450	Bahia Laura	Troopship	Germany	30 August 1941	HMS Trident	United Kingdom
450	Tama	Light cruiser	Japan	20 October 1944	USS Jallao	United States
448	Seisho Maru	Troopship	Japan	18 November 1944	USS Sunfish	United States
440	Asama Maru	Prisoner transport	Japan	1 November 1944	USS Atule	United States
436	Djemnah	Ocean liner	France	14 July 1918	SM UB-105	Germany
432	Città di Messina	Troopship	Italy	12 January 1941	HMS Regent	United Kingdom
419	HMS Dunedin	Light cruiser	United Kingdom	24 November 1941	U-124	Germany
417	HMS Penelope	Light cruiser	United Kingdom	18 February 1944	U-410	Germany
414	Transylvania	Troopship	United Kingdom	4 May 1917	SM U-63	Germany
400	Balkan	Troopship	France	16 August 1918	SM UB-48	Germany
392	Empress of Canada	Troopship	United Kingdom	13 March 1943	Leonardo da Vinci	Italy
381	Giovanni delle Bande Nere	Light cruiser	Italy	1 April 1942	HMS Urge	United Kingdom
379	Brazza	Ocean liner	France	28 May 1940	U-37	Germany
375	HMS Hogue	Armored cruiser	United Kingdom	22 September 1914	SM U-9	Germany
374	Amiral Charner	Armored cruiser	France	8 February 1916	SM U-21	Germany
373	Marina Raskova	Merchant ship	Soviet Union	13 August 1944	U-365	Germany
369	HMS Fidelity	Q-ship	United Kingdom	30 December 1942	U-435	Germany
364	Doggerbank	Blockade runner	Germany	3 March 1943	U-43	Germany
362	Abosso	Ocean liner	United Kingdom	29 October 1942	U-575	Germany
360	Calabria	Cargo and passenger liner	United Kingdom	8 December 1940	U-103	Germany
360	Almeda Star	Ocean liner	United Kingdom	17 January 1941	U-96	Germany
360	Atago	Heavy cruiser	Japan	23 October 1944	USS Darter	United States
349	Nagara	Light cruiser	Japan	7 August 1944	USS Croaker	United States
344	Medjerda	Troopship	France	11 May 1917	SM U-34	Germany
343	Emma	Cargo ship/Troopship	Italy	16 January 1943	HMS Splendid	United Kingdom
336	Maya	Heavy cruiser	Japan	23 October 1944	USS Dace	United States
336	Diana	Aviso/Sloop	Italy	29 June 1942	HMS Thrasher	United Kingdom
334	Persia	Ocean liner	United Kingdom	30 December 1915	SM U-38	Germany
330	Natori	Light cruiser	Japan	18 August 1944	USS Hardhead	United States
323	ARA General Belgrano	Light cruiser	Argentina	2 May 1982	HMS Conqueror	United Kingdom
320	Sebastiano Venier	Cargo ship serving as POW ship	Italy	9 December 1941	HMS Porpoise	United Kingdom
307	Urakaze	Destroyer	Japan	21 November 1944	USS Sealion	United States
305	Mefküre	Motor schooner	Turkey	5 August 1944	Shch-215	Soviet Union
300	Andrea Sgarallino	Passenger ship	Italy	22 September 1943	HMS Uproar	United Kingdom
272	Henry R. Mallory	Troopship	United States	7 February 1943	U-402	Germany
270	Baependy	Cargo liner	Brazil	15 August 1942	U-507	Germany
268	AHS Centaur	Hospital ship	Australia	14 May 1943	I-177	Japan
194	INS Khukri	Frigate	India	9 December 1971	PNS Hangor	Pakistan
193	USS Wasp	Aircraft carrier	United States	15 September 1942	I-19	Japan
187	MV Ciudad de Barcelona	Ocean Liner	Second Spanish Republic	30 May, 1937	General Sanjuro	Francoist Spain

== See also ==
- List of maritime disasters
