= Tatsuta Maru =

Japanese ocean liner

Coordinates: 34°45′N 140°25′E

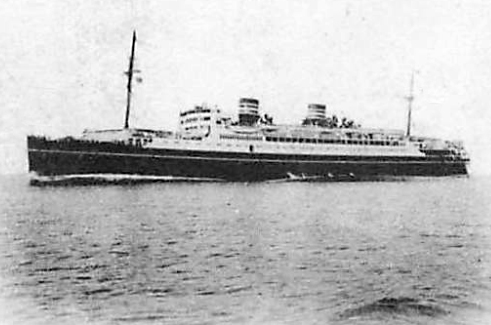
- Tatsuta Maru, before 1941

History

Japan
- Name: Tatsuta Maru
- Namesake: Tatsuta Shrine
- Operator: Nippon Yusen (NYK)
- Builder: Mitsubishi Shipbuilding & Engineering Co. Nagasaki, Japan
- Yard number: 451
- Laid down: 3 December 1927
- Launched: 12 April 1929
- Completed: 15 March 1930
- Out of service: 8 February 1943
- Fate: Torpedoed and sunk by US submarine Tarpon, 8 February 1943

General characteristics
- Tonnage: 16,975 gross register tons (GRT)
- Length: 178 m (584 ft)
- Beam: 21.9 m (72 ft)
- Draft: 28.5 ft (8.7 m)
- Propulsion: 4 Mitsubishi-Sulzer diesels, quadruple screws, 16,000 hp (12,000 kW)
- Speed: 21 knots (39 km/h; 24 mph)
- Capacity: 222 first class; 96 second class; 504 third class; 822 total
- Crew: 330
- Notes: Steel construction

Tatsuta Maru (龍田丸), was a Japanese ocean liner owned by Nippon Yusen Kaisha (NYK). The ship was built in 1927–1929 by Mitsubishi Shipbuilding & Engineering Co. at Nagasaki, Japan. The vessel was named after Tatsuta Jinja an important Shinto shrine in Nara Prefecture.

== Background ==
Tatsuta Maru and her sister ships Asama Maru and Chichibu Maru were built for NYK's premier high-speed trans-Pacific Orient-California fortnightly service, coming into operation from the autumn of 1929 In NYK advertising, these ships were characterized as "The Queen of the Sea." The principal ports-of-call included Hong Kong, Shanghai, Kobe, Yokohama, Honolulu, Los Angeles, and San Francisco. The trip from Yokohama to San Francisco typically took 15 days, with fares starting from $190 in second class and from $315 in first class.

== Details ==
The 16,975-ton vessel had a length of 583 feet (178 m), and a beam of 71 feet (22 m). The ship had four Mitsubishi-Sulzer diesel engines, two funnels, two masts, quadruple screws and a service speed of 21 knots. only one funnel was actually necessary, but a second one was added for the sake of appearance.

Tatsuta Maru provided accommodation for 222 first-class passengers and for 96 second-class passengers. There was also room for up to 504 third-class passengers. The ship and passengers were served by a crew of 330.

She was laid down on 3 December 1927 at Mitsubishi Shipbuilding & Engineering Co. Nagasaki, Japan, with yard number 451, and was launched on 12 April 1929. When almost complete, she was severely damaged by fire on 7 February 1930, but the damage was repaired quickly and she soon was completed.

View of the ship's first class dining room.

View of the ship's first class reading and writing room.

== Civilian career ==
Tatsuta Maru undertook her maiden voyage on 15 March 1930, sailing from Yokohama to San Francisco, and subsequently commenced regularly scheduled trans-Pacific services via Honolulu. In October 1931, she carried members of the American Major League Baseball teams, including Lou Gehrig to Japan for a Japanese-American exhibition tournament. On 12 November 1936, she became the first civilian vessel to pass under the San Francisco–Oakland Bay Bridge, the longest in the world at the time.

In 1938, the transliteration of her name was official changed to Tatuta Maru, in line with new Japanese regulations on the Romanization of Japanese.

In January 1940, Tatsuta Maru was scheduled to carry 512 seamen from the German transport SS Columbus, who had been interned in the United States after they scuttled their ship rather than to have it fall into the hands of the British. However, due to political pressure applied on the American government, they were not allowed to board. In June of the same year, she arrived in San Francisco with 40 Jewish refugees from Russia, Austria, Germany, and Norway who had managed to reach Japan overland via Siberia.

In San Francisco on 20 March 1941, Tatsuta Maru disembarked Colonel Hideo Iwakuro dispatched by Prime Minister Hideki Tojo to assist Ambassador Admiral Kichisaburo Nomura in his negotiations with the United States. On 26 July, President Franklin D. Roosevelt signed an executive order to seize Japanese assets in the United States in retaliation for the Japanese invasion of French Indochina. Tatsuta Maru was in San Francisco at the time, and American authorities confiscated a shipment of over nine million dollars in bonds by the Yokohama Specie Bank. On 30 July, the American government granted Tatsuta Maru a license to purchase enough fuel oil for the voyage back to Japan. This was last official oil export from the United States to Japan before the start of World War II. On the return voyage to Japan, the ship was struck with a case of food poisoning in which 125 passengers were affected, of which eight died. One of the stricken passengers was Susumu Nikaido, the post-war vice-president of the LDP. The incident was the subject of an essay by Yuriko Miyamoto.

On 30 August, Tatsuta Maru transported 349 Polish Jewish refugees who had arrived in Japan via Siberia from Kobe to Shanghai, where they were received by the Shanghai Ghetto. On 15 October, under contract to the Japanese government, she was temporarily designated a diplomatic exchange vessel, and was used in the repatriation of 608 Allied nationals to the United States. Travelling under total radio silence, she arrived at San Francisco on 30 October, and after embarking 860 Japanese nationals, returned to Yokohama via Honolulu on 14 November. This was the last civilian passenger voyage between Japan and the United States before World War II. She departed Yokohama on 2 December, ostensibly on a second repatriation voyage to bring Japanese back from Mexico; however, the voyage was a hoax, and on 6 December, the captain opened sealed orders which instructed him to reverse course. Shortly after returning to Yokohama, she is requisitioned by the Imperial Japanese Navy.

== Military career ==
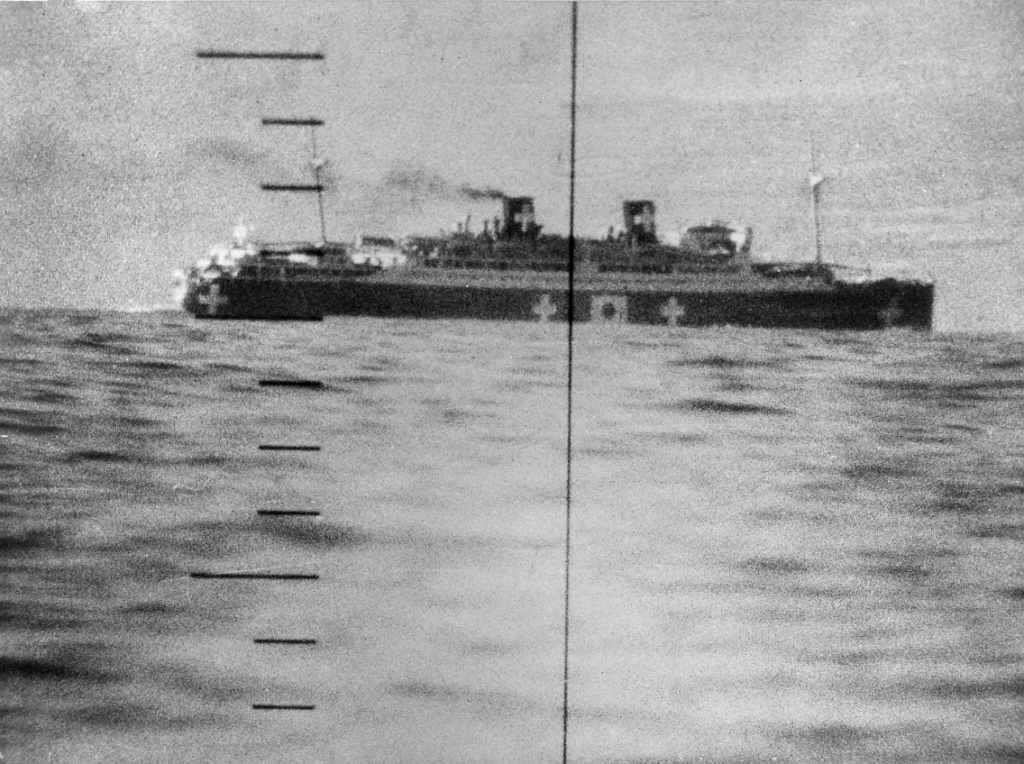
Tatsuta Maru, marked with symbols of safe passage while working as a repatriation ship as seen through the periscope of the U.S. Navy submarine USS Kingfish (SS-234) in October 1942.

In early 1942, Tatsuta Maru made several voyages between Japan and the Philippines and Borneo as a troopship. In July 1942, Tatsuta Maru was again temporarily designated a diplomatic exchange vessel, and was used in the repatriation of the prewar diplomatic staffs of Japan and the Allied nations. She departed Yokohama with UK Ambassador Sir Robert Craigie and 60 other British diplomats, along members of many other foreign diplomatic delegations and civilians. On reaching Shanghai and Singapore, she took on many more repatriates, so that when she reached Lourenço Marques in Portuguese East Africa on August 27, she was carrying over 1000 civilians. These were exchanged for Japanese civilians and diplomats, and Red Cross parcels for British prisoners of war in Japanese hands. On her return to Japan, she was re-requisitioned for use as a troopship, shuttling men and supplies from Japan to various points in Southeast Asia.

On 19 January 1943, she was assigned to carry 1180 Allied prisoners of war, mostly Canadians, from Hong Kong to Nagasaki. The prisoners were so overcrowded that there was no room to lay down. This earned Tatsuta Maru the epithet of "hell ship."

On 8 February 1943, Tatsuta Maru departed Yokosuka Naval District for Truk accompanied by the destroyer Yamagumo. The ships were spotted by the American submarine Tarpon 42 miles east of Mikurajima. After being hit by up to four torpedoes, Tatsuta Maru sank with a loss of 1,223 soldiers and passengers and 198 crewmen. As the sinking occurred at night during a gale, Yamagumo was unable to find any survivors.

== See also ==
- List by death toll of ships sunk by submarines
- List of ocean liners
- Tatsuta Shrine
