= French destroyer Catapulte =

Destroyer of the French Navy

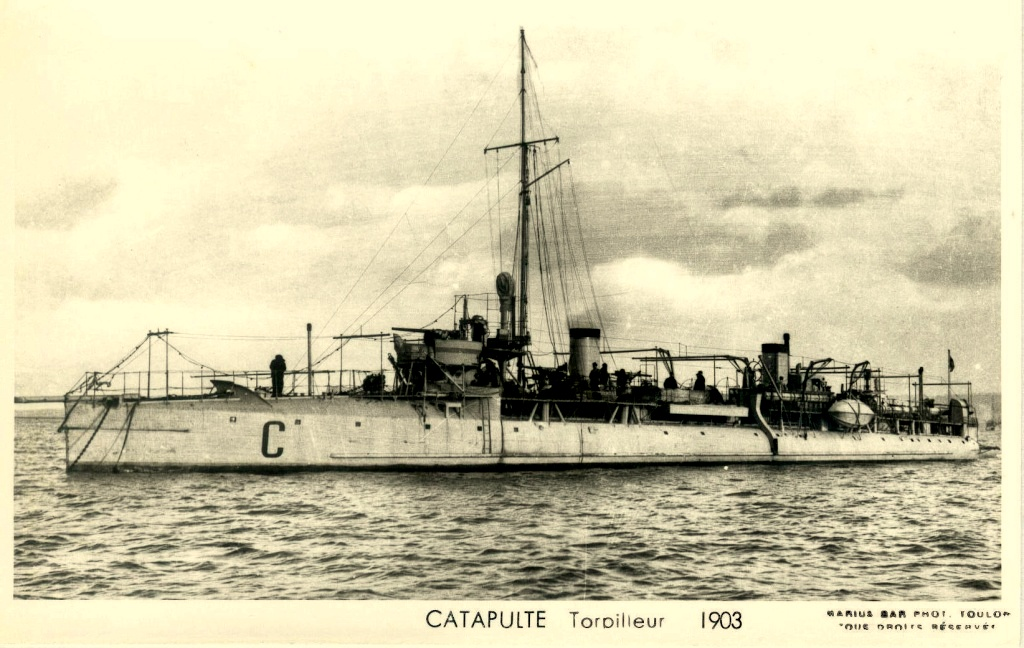
- A postcard of Catapulte at anchor

History

France
- Name: Catapulte
- Namesake: Catapult
- Ordered: 1901
- Builder: Forges et Chantiers de la Méditerranée, Le Havre-Graville
- Laid down: 1901
- Launched: 1 April 1903
- Fate: Sunk in collision, 18 May 1918

General characteristics
- Class & type: Arquebuse-class destroyer
- Displacement: 357 t (351 long tons) (deep load)
- Length: 56.58 m (185 ft 8 in) (o/a)
- Beam: 6.38 m (20 ft 11 in)
- Draft: 3.2 m (10 ft 6 in) (deep load)
- Installed power: 2 water-tube boilers; 6,300 ihp (4,698 kW)
- Propulsion: 2 shafts; 2 triple-expansion steam engines
- Speed: 28 knots (52 km/h; 32 mph)
- Range: 2,300 nmi (4,300 km; 2,600 mi) at 10 knots (19 km/h; 12 mph)
- Complement: 4 officers and 58 enlisted men
- Armament: 1 × single 65 mm (2.6 in) gun; 6 × single 47 mm (1.9 in) guns; 2 × single 381 mm (15 in) torpedo tubes

Catapulte was a Arquebuse-class destroyer contre-torpilleur d'escadre built for the French Navy in the first decade of the 20th century. Completed in 1903, the ship was assigned to the Northern Squadron (Escadre du Nord).

== Design and description ==
The Arquebuse class was designed as a faster version of the preceding Durandal class. The ships had an overall length of 56.58 meters (185 ft 8 in), a beam of 6.3 meters (20 ft 8 in), and a maximum draft of 3.2 meters (10 ft 6 in). They normally displaced 307 metric tons (302 long tons) and 357 t (351 long tons) at deep load. The two vertical triple-expansion steam engines each drove one propeller shaft using steam provided by two du Temple Guyot or Normand boilers. The engines were designed to produce a total of 6,300 indicated horsepower (4,700 kW) for a designed speed of 28 knots (52 km/h; 32 mph), all the ships exceeded their contracted speed during their sea trials with Catapulte reaching a speed of 30.9 knots (57.2 km/h; 35.6 mph). They carried enough coal to give them a range of 2,300 nautical miles (4,300 km; 2,600 mi) at 10 knots (19 km/h; 12 mph). Their crew consisted of four officers and fifty-eight enlisted men.

The main armament of the Arquebuse-class ships consisted of a single 65-millimeter (2.6 in) gun forward of the bridge and six 47-millimeter (1.9 in) Hotchkiss guns in single mounts, three on each broadside. They were fitted with two single rotating mounts for 381-millimeter (15 in) torpedo tubes on the centerline, one between the funnels and the other on the stern.

== Construction and career ==
Catapulte (Catapult) was ordered from Forges et Chantiers de la Méditerranée on 29 May 1901 and the ship was laid down later that year at its shipyard in Le Havre-Graville. She was launched on 1 April 1903 and conducted her sea trials during May–September 1903. The ship was commissioned (armement définitif) the following month after their completion and was assigned to the Northern Squadron.

When the First World War began in August 1914, Catapulte was assigned to the 3rd Destroyer Flotilla (3^{e} escadrille de torpilleurs) of the 2nd Light Squadron (2^{e} escadre légère) based at Cherbourg.

On 11 May 1918, Catapulte assisted several other ships in rescuing the survivors of the French troopship Sant Anna, which was carrying 2,025 troops when she was torpedoed and sunk in the Mediterranean Sea with the loss of 605 lives by the Imperial German Navy submarine SM UC-54 26 nautical miles east of Cape Bon, French Tunisia.

On 18 May 1918, Catapulte was escorting a convoy carrying troops from Bizerte (Tunisia) to Marseille (France). Off Bône, French Algeria, the destroyer collided with the British steamer Warrimoo, some of Catapulte's depth charges broke loose, fell into the sea and detonated, sinking both ships. 58 of Catapulte's crew and one person aboard Warrimoo were killed.

== Bibliography ==
- Couhat, Jean Labayle (1974). French Warships of World War I. London: Ian Allan. ISBN 0-7110-0445-5.
- Prévoteaux, Gérard (2017). La marine française dans la Grande guerre: les combattants oubliés: Tome I 1914–1915 [The French Navy during the Great War: The Forgotten Combatants, Book I 1914–1915]. Collection Navires & Histoire des Marines du Mond. Vol. 23. Le Vigen, France: Éditions Lela presse. ISBN 978-2-37468-000-2.
- Prévoteaux, Gérard (2017). La marine française dans la Grande guerre: les combattants oubliés: Tome II 1916–1918 [The French Navy during the Great War: The Forgotten Combatants, Book II 1916–1918]. Collection Navires & Histoire des Marines du Mond. Vol. 27. Le Vigen, France: Éditions Lela presse. ISBN 978-2-37468-001-9.
- Roberts, Stephen S. (2021). French Warships in the Age of Steam 1859–1914: Design, Construction, Careers and Fates. Barnsley, UK: Seaforth Publishing. ISBN 978-1-5267-4533-0.
- Stanglini, Ruggero & Cosentino, Michelle (2022). The French Fleet: Ships, Strategy and Operations, 1870–1918. Barnsley: Seaforth Publishing. ISBN 978-1-5267-0131-2.
