= Tatsuta Taisha =

Shinto shrine in Nara Prefecture, Japan

Tatsuta Shrine (龍田大社, Tatsuta-taisha)
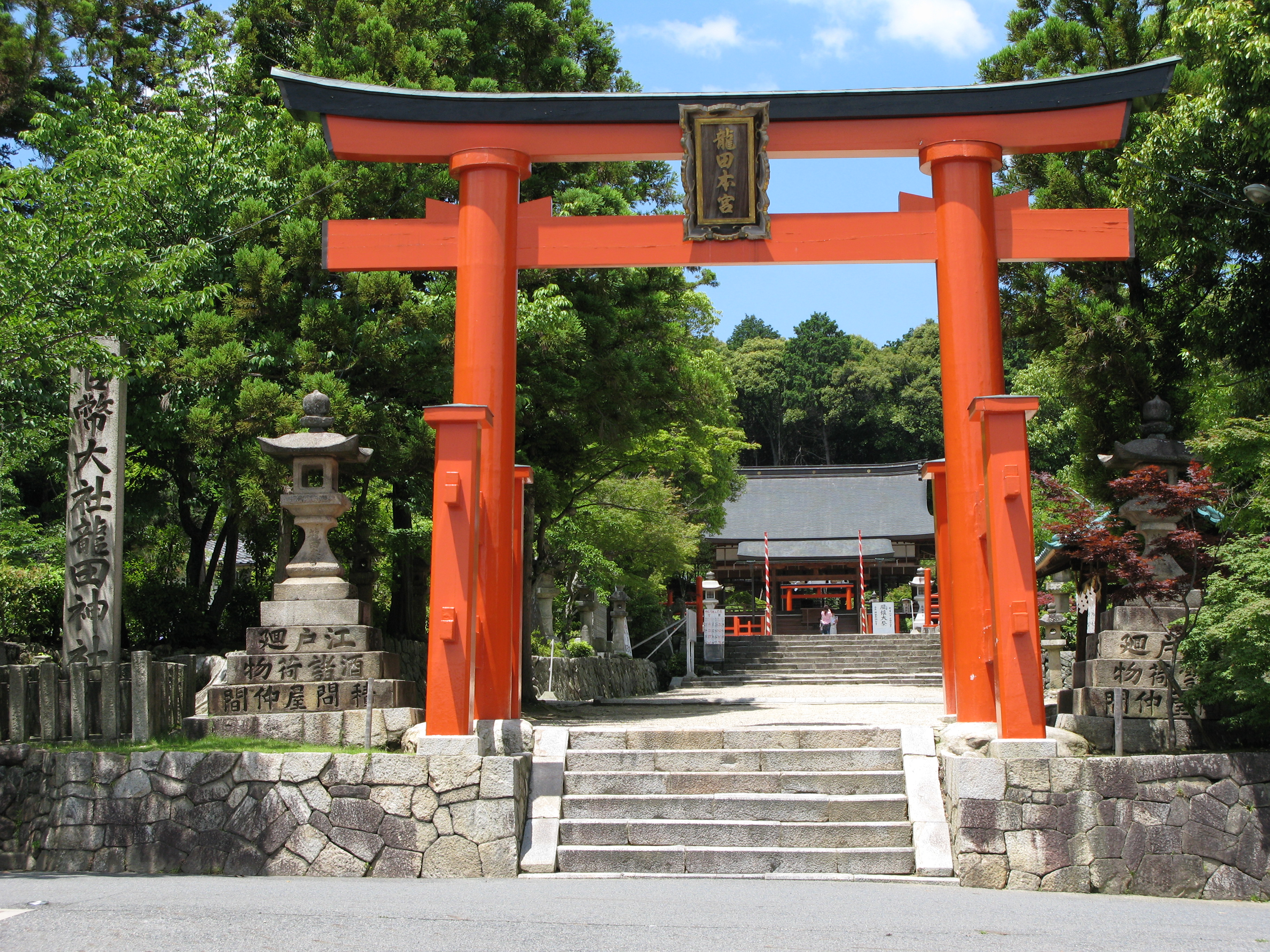
- Torii at the entrance of Tatsuta Shrine

- Location within Japan

Religion
- Affiliation: Shinto
- Deity: Shinatsuhiko

Location
- Interactive map of Tatsuta Shrine (龍田大社, Tatsuta-taisha)
- Coordinates: 34°35′35″N 135°41′15″E

Architecture
- Style: Kasuga-zukuri

Tatsuta Shrine (龍田大社, Tatsuta-taisha) is a Shinto shrine located in Sangō, Nara in Japan. The shrine is also known in Japanese (esp. formerly) as Tatsuta-jinja (龍田神社).

The Shrine became the object of Imperial patronage during the early Heian period. In 965, Emperor Murakami ordered that Imperial messengers were sent to report important events to the guardian kami of Japan. These heihaku were initially presented to 16 shrines including the Tatsuta Shrine.

From 1871 through 1946, the Tatsuta Shrine was officially designated one of the Kanpei-taisha (官幣大社), meaning that it stood in the first rank of government supported shrines.

== See also ==
- List of Shinto shrines
- Twenty-Two Shrines
- Modern system of ranked Shinto Shrines
- Tatsuta Maru
