= Hideo Iwakuro =

Japanese general (1897–1970)

- 岩畔 豪雄
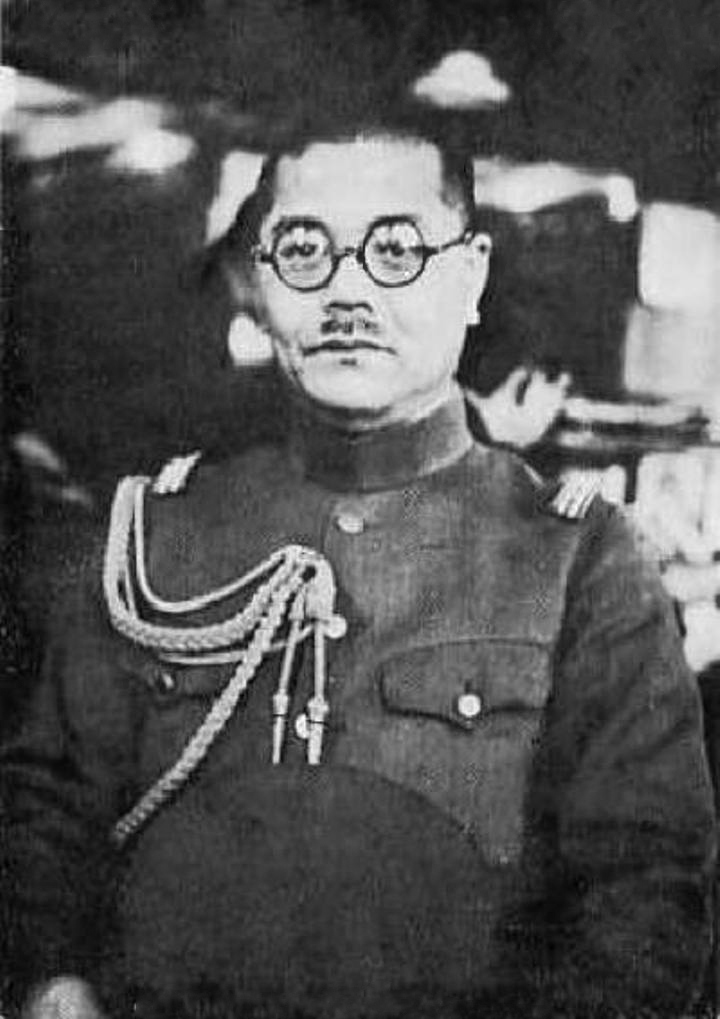
- Born: 10 October 1897; Kurahashi, Hiroshima, Japan
- Died: 22 November 1970 (aged 73)
- Military career
- Allegiance: Empire of Japan
- Branch: Imperial Japanese Army
- Service years: 1918-1945
- Rank: Major General
- Conflicts: Siberian Intervention; Second Sino-Japanese War; World War II

Hideo Iwakuro (岩畔 豪雄, Iwakuro Hideo; 10 October 1897 – 22 November 1970) was a major general in the Imperial Japanese Army during World War II. He is also known as one of the founders of the Kyoto Sangyo University.

== Biography ==
=== Early career ===
Iwakuro was born on Kurahashi-jima in the Inland Sea (then part of Aki County, Hiroshima prefecture). Although he grew up on the island neighboring Etajima (where the Imperial Japanese Naval Academy was located), Iwakuro had no interest in a naval career, and was sent for schooling to a military academy in Nagoya. He graduated in the 30th class of the Imperial Japanese Army Academy in 1918, and was assigned to the 16th Infantry Regiment, based at Shibata city in the Hokuetsu region of Japan.

In September 1920, Iwakuro's regiment was assigned as part of the Japanese expeditionary force participating in the Siberian Intervention, and Iwakuro participated in numerous combat missions against Bolshevik partisans. In 1921, Iwakuro was transferred to the Taiwan Army of Japan, and was based in Taichung. He returned to mainland Japan in 1926 to attend the 38th class of the Army War College (Japan), and it was shortly after graduation that he became a member of the Sakura Kai ultranationalist secret society. In 1932, he was transferred to Manchuria shortly after the Manchurian Incident and assigned to the Kwantung Army, where he held a number of staff positions and was actively involved in planning the independence of Manchukuo, and its future economic development under Imperial Japanese Army management.

=== Spymaster ===
Iwakuro was recalled to Japan shortly after the February 26 Incident of 1936, and was a member of the court martial of the perpetrators. He was then assigned to Army Intelligence, where he oversaw the wiretapping of foreign embassies, interception of mail and correspondence and the production of counterfeit money for use in future operations. In 1937, he was transferred to the newly created 8th Section of the Imperial Japanese Army General Staff, and was tasked with planning the independence of Wang Jingwei's Nanjing Nationalist Chinese government. In 1938, he was on the committee which established the Nakano School, Japan's training school for intelligence and counter-intelligence agents.

From 1939 to 1941, Iwakuro was Chief of Army Affairs Section in the Military Affairs Bureau, where his primary task was military procurement. Using the Tripartite Alliance, Iwakuro strongly pressed Nazi Germany to share military technologies, particularly in terms of armor and aviation-related technologies. He also established a research facility to investigate new technologies, such as microwaves, for potential military applications.

Iwakuro, unlike many in the Japanese Army senior staff, was always strongly against war with the Soviet Union (Hokushin-ron) and was conversely a strong proponent of the Nanshin-ron philosophy as were many senior offices in the Imperial Japanese Navy. With the defeat of the Japanese Army at Nomonhan Iwakuro became more outspoken in favor of the concept of a Greater East Asia Co-Prosperity Sphere and the need for Japan to prepare for total war.

=== Diplomat ===
Iwakuro was sent as military attaché to the United States in 1941 over the objections of Foreign Minister Yōsuke Matsuoka. However, the Army's position was that Matsuoka was too inexperienced in foreign affairs, and needed additional training. Iwakuro was a close adviser of Japanese ambassador Admiral Kichisaburō Nomura in the Washington negotiations just before the outbreak of the Pacific War. He was withdrawn after the formation of a new cabinet under Hideki Tōjō in August 1941, and was named Commanding Officer of the 5th Imperial Guards Regiment. But, according to John Toland, The Rising Sun, volume one, page 85, "The former (previous sentence referenced Matsuoka) suggested that Ikawa sound out the army in the person of an influential colonel in the War Ministry named Hideo Iwakuro.

=== Command and Staff appointments ===
After the start of the Pacific War, the 5th Imperial Guards Regiment came under the command of the Southern Expeditionary Army Group, and was assigned to Malaya and Singapore. While in Singapore, Iwakuro became head of the I Kikan, and was senior liaison officer with the Indian National Army.

In 1943, Iwakuro was promoted to Vice Chief of Staff of the Twenty-Fifth Army. He subsequently became Chief of Staff of the Twenty-Eighth Army in Burma in 1944–45.

Recalled to Japan before the end of the war, Iwakuro was attached to Army Ordnance Administrative Headquarters in 1945, and was Head of Army Investigation Department at the time of the end of the war.

After the war, in 1965, Iwakuro became one of the founders of the Kyoto Sangyo University. He died in 1970 of a heart attack.
