= Chichibu Maru =

Japanese ocean liner (1929–1943)

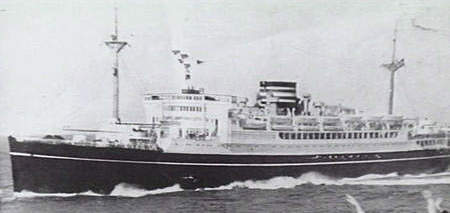
- Chichibu Maru as a civilian ship

History

Japan
- Name: Chichibu Maru (1930–1938); Kamakura Maru (1939–1943)
- Operator: Nippon Yusen Kaisha
- Builder: Yokohama Dock Co., Yokohama, Japan
- Yard number: 170
- Laid down: 6 February 1928
- Launched: 8 May 1929
- Completed: 10 March 1930
- Maiden voyage: April 1930
- Fate: Torpedoed and sunk, 28 April 1943

General characteristics
- Type: Passenger liner
- Tonnage: 17,526 GRT
- Length: 170.7 m (560 ft 0 in)
- Beam: 22.6 m (74 ft 2 in)
- Draft: 8.7 m (28.5 ft)
- Propulsion: 2 Burmeister & Wain diesels, twin screws
- Speed: 19 knots (35 km/h; 22 mph)
- Capacity: 817 passengers

Chichibu Maru (秩父丸) was a Japanese passenger ship which, renamed Kamakura Maru, was sunk during World War II, killing 2,035 soldiers and civilians on board.

== Description ==
The ship had a beam of 22.6 meters (74 ft 2 in), a length of 178 meters (584 ft 0 in) and a tonnage of 17,498. The cruising speed was 19 knots (35 km/h; 22 mph), with a maximum of 21 knots (39 km/h; 24 mph). Chichibu Maru could carry 817 passengers. She differed from her half-sisters, Asama Maru and Tatsuta Maru, in her propulsion system, and in having one (rather than two) funnels.

== Construction and career ==
Chichibu Maru was built for the Nippon Yusen shipping company by the Yokohama Dock Company. She was launched on 8 May 1929 and completed in 1930. Before the war, the ship carried passengers between Yokohama and San Francisco. Prince Takamatsu and Princess Takamatsu also traveled on this ship. Following the adoption of Kunrei-shiki romanization the ship was renamed Kamakura Maru in 1939. In 1942, she was requisitioned by the Imperial Japanese Navy to serve as a troop transport ship, and also as hospital ship.

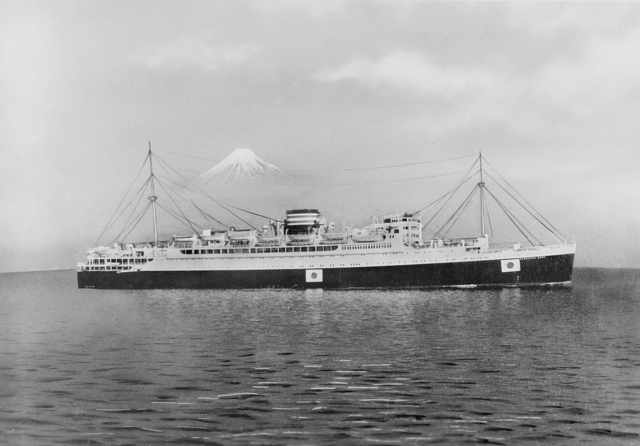
Kamakura Maru with Mount Fuji in the background.

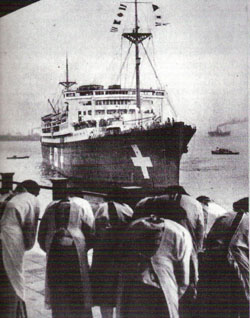
Kamakura Maru arriving at Yokohama with the ashes of the four submariners killed in the attack on Sydney Harbour.

Despite hostilities between various nations during World War II, a number of interchanges of prisoners, diplomats and other personnel took place amongst the warring parties. These usually occurred over long distances utilising neutral ports. Kamakura Maru was a participant in one of the most significant of these exchanges. On 10 August 1942, she departed Yokohama with British diplomats and members of other foreign diplomatic delegations and civilians. On 14 August, she arrived at Shanghai where she was joined by another exchange vessel Tatsuta Maru carrying Sir Robert Craigie, the British Ambassador and other diplomats. Kamakura Maru picked up another 903 British and foreign nationals at Shanghai. The following day both ships sailed for Saigon and then Singapore picking up a few more foreign nationals at each place. Meanwhile, on 18 August, SS City of Canterbury at Melbourne, Australia, embarked the Japanese Minister (Ambassador) to Australia, Kawai Tatsuo, and 870 other Japanese officials and their families and a few Siamese nationals for repatriation. Minister Kawai took aboard four white boxes containing the ashes of Japanese midget submariners killed in the 31 May 1942 attack on Sydney Harbour. On 6 September, Kamakura Maru arrived at Lourenço Marques, Portuguese East Africa. The Japanese passengers disembarked from City of Canterbury and embarked on Kamakura Maru. The ship loaded 47,710 Red Cross parcels for prisoners of war (POWs) in the Far East. The western nationals were disembarked from Kamakura Maru, with 115 Australian, British and Allied nationals embarked on City of Canterbury for the return voyage to Australia. Other repatriates waited for transportation on other vessels. On 11 September Kamakura Maru arrived at Singapore disembarking 289 Japanese and delivered 14,770 parcels for POWs. In early October 1942, the ship arrived at Hong Kong with 32,940 parcels for POWs. On 8 October Kamakura Maru arrived at Yokohama, where several thousand people were present as Minister Kawai handed over the boxes of ashes to relatives of the midget submariners.

Asama Maru was involved in a similar diplomatic exchange in July 1942, paired with MS Gripsholm, also at Lourenco Marques, mainly with American diplomats being exchanged. Thus, all three of the sister ships were involved in this unique type of operation.

=== Sinking ===
On 28 April 1943, Kamakura Maru, sailing from Manila to Singapore and carrying some 2,500 soldiers and civilians. The vessel was unescorted in the Sulu Sea 15 miles (24 km) southwest of Naso Point, Panay Island, Philippine Islands. The US submarine USS Gudgeon fired a spread of four torpedoes at the Japanese vessel at a range of 3,200 yards (2,900 m). After two minutes there were two explosions. Kamakura Maru was hit twice on her starboard side at the No. 4 hold where fuel and vehicles immediately caught fire which rapidly spread. Twelve minutes after the strike there was an explosion and the ship upended and sank by the stern. The US submarine passed through the area where the ship sank and reported a dozen lifeboats and floating debris and a large number of people in the water.

Four days later, 465 survivors (28 sailors out of 176 crew, and 437 passengers) were rescued from the sea by Japanese ships, implying some 2,035 people were killed. The Japanese crew failed to send out a distress signal before the ship sank, thus no one suspected its loss until 3 May 1943.

== See also ==
- List by death toll of ships sunk by submarines
- Foreign commerce and shipping of the Empire of Japan
- Attack on Sydney Harbour: Aftermath
