= SS Sant Anna =

Transatlantic ocean liner and troopship

Coordinates: 37.0400°N 11.3600°E

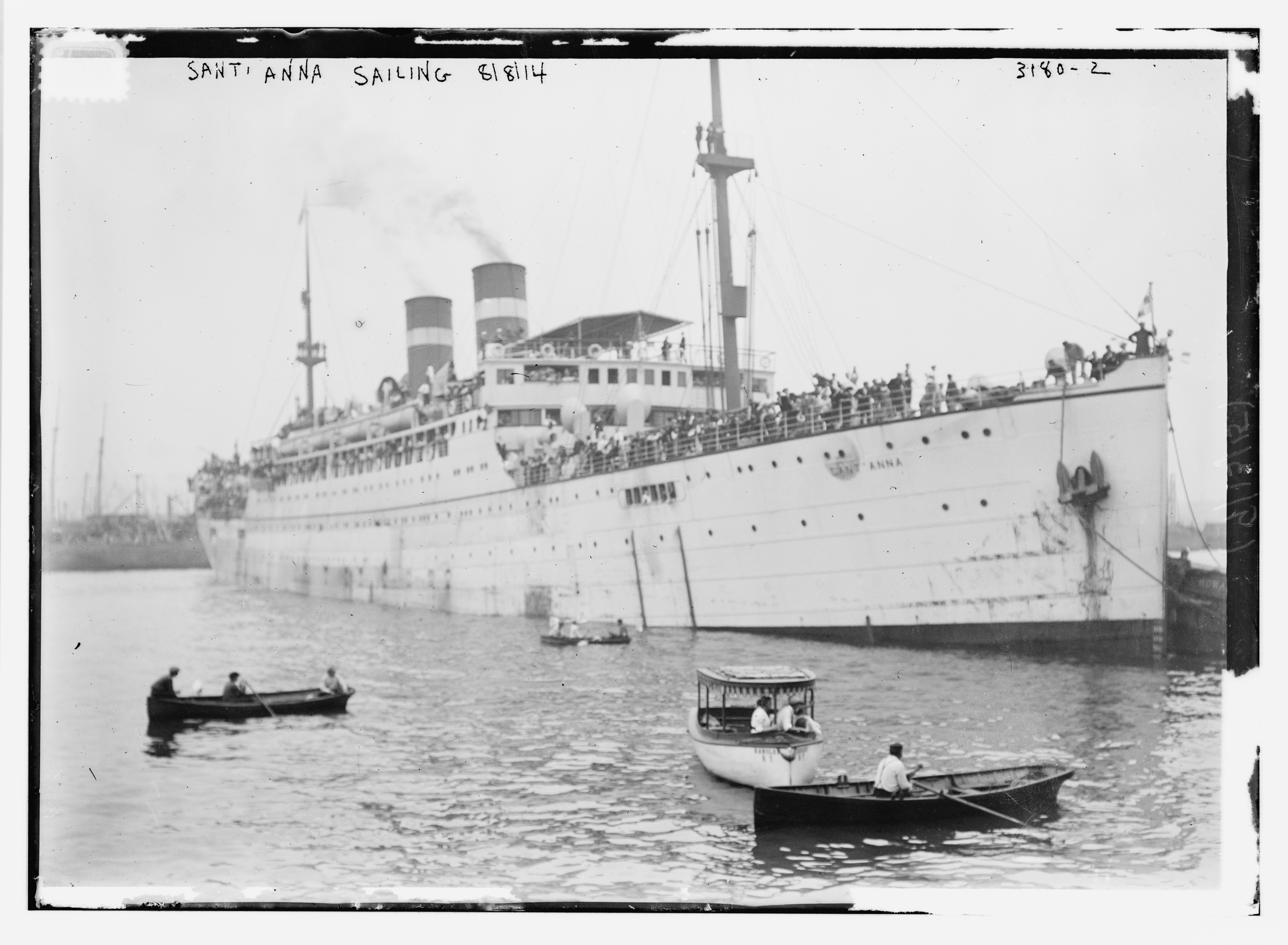
- Sant' Anna sailing with French reservists, August 8, 1914

History

France
- Name: Sant' Anna
- Owner: Compagnie de Navigation À Vapeur Cyprien Fabre & Cie (Fabre Line)
- Builder: Forges et Chantiers de la Méditerranée, La Seyne-sur-Mer
- Launched: 7 February 1910
- Completed: July 1910
- Fate: Torpedoed and sunk on 11 May 1918

General characteristics
- Type: Ocean liner
- Tonnage: 9,350 GRT
- Length: 151 m (495 ft 5 in)
- Beam: 17.5 m (57 ft 5 in)
- Height: 20 m (65 ft 7 in)
- Installed power: 10,000 PS (7,400 kW)
- Speed: 16.5 knots (16.5 kn) max
- Capacity: 70 First Class passengers; 250 Second Class passengers; 1,850 Third Class passengers

SS Sant′ Anna was a transatlantic ocean liner converted into a troopship in 1915, torpedoed and sunk in the Mediterranean Sea on 11 May 1918 with 605 casualties.

Sant′ Anna was built for Compagnie Française de Navigation à vapeur (Cyprien Fabre et Cie, de Marseille) as an ocean liner for service between France and New York City and was launched on 7 February 1910 at Forges et Chantiers de la Méditerranée, La Seyne . The ship was operational between 1910 and 1915, when she was requisitioned by the French Army and refitted as a troopship for use in World War I. On 19 September 1915 a fire broke out on board, which was thought to be an act of German sabotage. On 12 April 1916 Sant′ Anna made her first trip to the Salonika front with 1,027 Serbian Army soldiers and 129 horses on board.

On 11 May 1918 she was again steaming in the Mediterranean Sea on a voyage from Bizerte for Thessaloniki under the escort of two British sloops, HMS Cyclamen and HMS Verhana, with 2,025 soldiers on board (574 Senegalese, 429 Kabyle, 194 Annamite, nine Greek, and the rest French). She was torpedoed at 3:15 AM by the Imperial German Navy submarine UC-54, commanded by Heinrich XXXVII Prinz Reuß zu Köstritz. She sank at 3:58 AM off the coast of French Tunisia, some 26 nautical miles (48 km; 30 mi) east of Cape Bon, killing 605 of the soldiers. The two British sloops rescued the survivors, assisted by the French Navy destroyer Catapulte, a British gunboat, the French sloop Saint Jean, and the vessels Auguste Leblond and Marguerite Marie.

== See also ==
- List by death toll of ships sunk by submarines

== Sources ==
- Navires 14-18
- Technical data, pictures, lists of names
- Wreck site
- Helgason, Guðmundur. "Ships hit during WWI: {{{name}}}". German and Austrian U-boats of World War I - Kaiserliche Marine - Uboat.net.
