= SS Miowera =

Passenger and refrigerated cargo liner

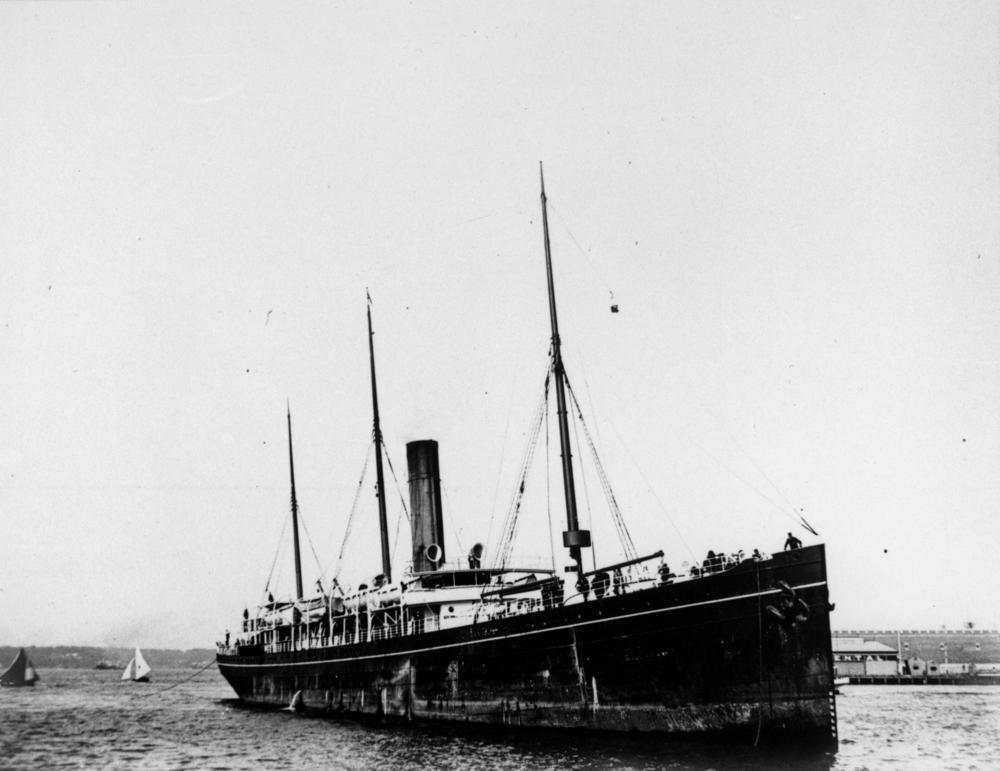
- Miowera in Sydney Harbour in 1903

History
- Name: 1892: Miowera; 1908: Maitai
- Namesake: 1908: Maitai River
- Owner: 1892: NZ & Australian Steamship Co; 1893–97: Canadian Australian SS Co; 1897–1908: NZ Shipping Co; 1908–10: Union SS Co of NZ
- Operator: 1892–97: James Huddart; 1897–1908: New Zealand Shipping Co; 1908–10: Union SS Co of NZ
- Port of registry: 1892: (United Kingdom) London; 1908: (New Zealand) Dunedin
- Builder: Swan, Hunter, Wallsend
- Yard number: 176
- Launched: 25 July 1892
- Completed: October 1892
- Identification: UK official number 101935; code letters MTCD
- Fate: Ran aground 25 December 1916

General characteristics
- Type: passenger and refrigerated cargo ship
- Tonnage: 3,393 GRT, 1,888 NRT
- Length: 345 ft (105 m) registered length
- Beam: 42.2 ft (12.9 m)
- Depth: 25.1 ft (7.7 m)
- Installed power: 722 NHP
- Propulsion: 3-cylinder triple-expansion engine
- Speed: 15 knots (28 km/h)
- Notes: sister ship: Warrimoo

SS Miowera was a passenger and refrigerated cargo liner that was launched in 1892 in England for Australian owners, and was later owned by two of New Zealand's foremost shipping companies. In 1908 her last owners renamed her Maitai. She was wrecked on a reef in the Cook Islands in 1916.

The ship should not be confused with an earlier steamship called Maitai, which was wrecked on Richards Rock near the Mercury Islands in 1889.

== Building ==
Swan, Hunter built Miowera at Wallsend on the River Tyne, launching her on 25 July 1892 and completing her that October. She was a sister ship for Warrimoo, which Swan, Hunter launched in May 1892 and completed in July.

== Service ==
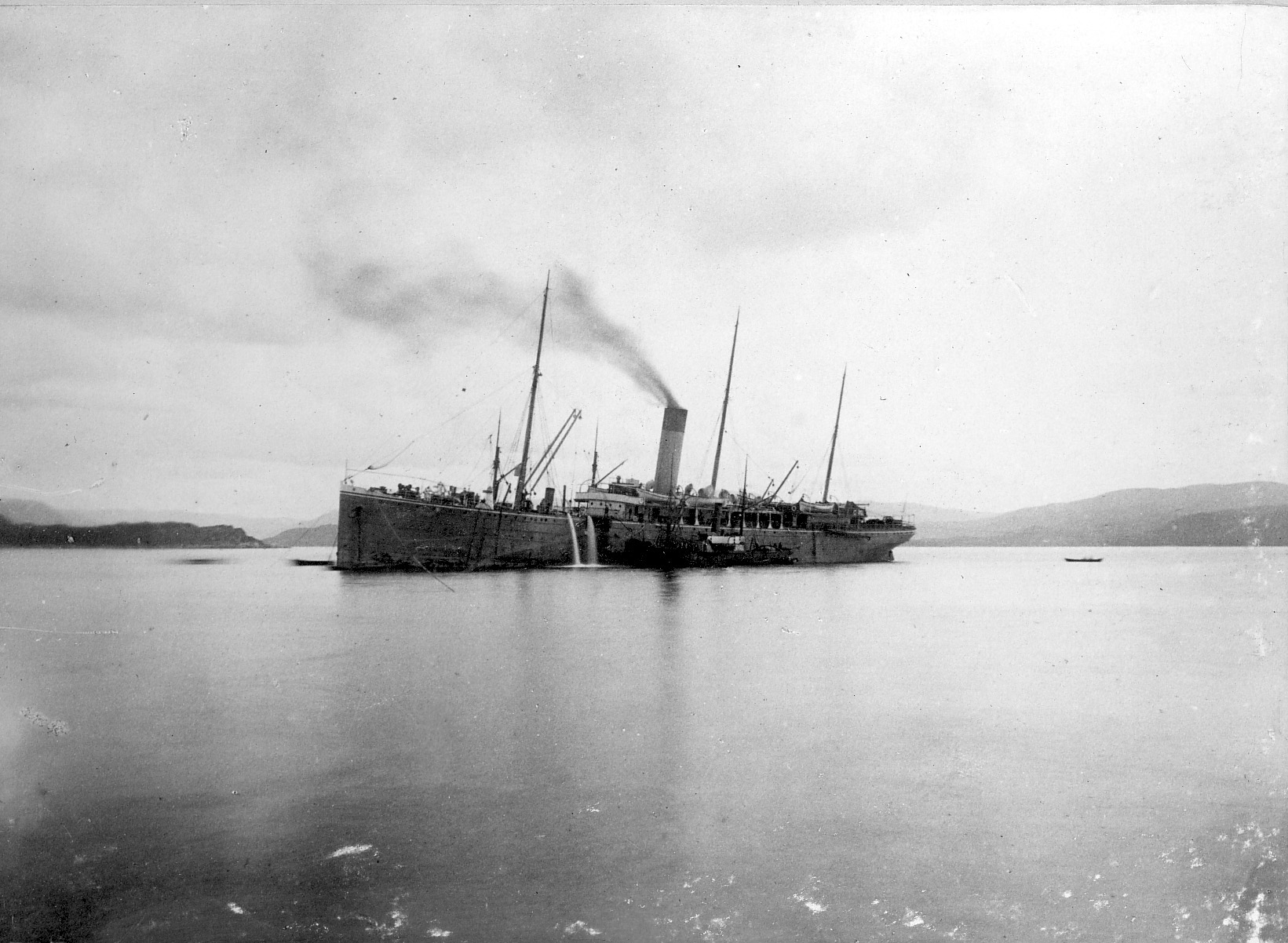
Miowera aground near Bergen in Norway in 1894

James Huddart ordered Warrimoo and Miowera for his New Zealand and Australian Steam Ship Company to run a Trans-Tasman service between New Zealand and Australia. However, in 1893 Huddart created the Canadian-Australian Steam Ship Company to operate a liner service between Australia and Vancouver, British Columbia, and he transferred Warrimoo and Miowera to this new service.

In 1897 the New Zealand Shipping Company bought both Warrimoo and Miowera. In 1908 the Union Steamship Company of New Zealand, commonly called simply the "Union Company", bought Miowera and renamed her Maitai.

The Union Company ran Maitai between Wellington and San Francisco.

== Loss ==
On the afternoon of 25 December 1916 Maitai arrived in Avarua Harbour, Rarotonga en route from San Francisco to Wellington. Lighters came alongside to discharge her cargo, and many of her passengers joined the lighters to go ashore for a few hours. Maitai's crew set about retrieving an anchor that the ship had lost in the harbour on a previous visit.

Later it was noticed that Maitai was drifting, and about 2120 hrs she struck a reef. Her first officer ran to her bridge and rang "full astern" on her engine order telegraph, but Maitai was stuck fast amidships and could not move herself.

Maitai was carrying 43 passengers and 900 tons of cargo, including more than 1,400 bags of mail bound for New Zealand. Much of the mail was from troops serving overseas.

Maitai was stuck on South Reef. There was a heavy swell that rolled the ship, and became stronger in the course of the evening. In difficult and worsening conditions her crew disembarked her remaining passengers and put them ashore and unloaded all her mail. Her engine room and stokehold flooded, forcing her stokers to abandon the stokehold at about 0100 hrs on 26 December.

On 26 December local labour was enlisted to remove Maitai's stores and fittings and as much as possible of her cargo. Because her engine room was flooded she could not raise steam to work her winches, so everything had to be lifted manually. About 400 tons of her cargo was saved. By 1500 hrs on 26 December there was 15 ft (5 m) of water in her number three hold.

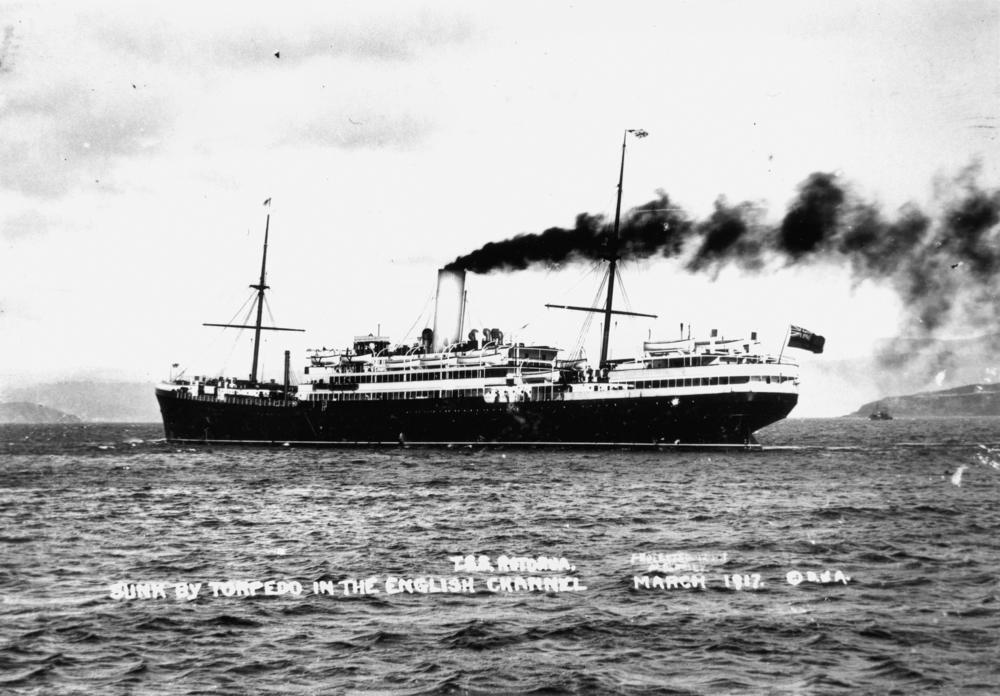
The liner Rotorua took Maitai's passengers and mail from Rarotonga to Auckland

The Union Company chartered the steamship Cholita to come to her aid from Tahiti, and the New Zealand Shipping Company diverted its liner Rotorua to help. Rotorua reached Rarotonga on 31 December, embarked Maitai's passengers and loaded her mails. Rotorua already had a full complement of passengers, so Maitai's passengers had to provide their own bedding and travel as deck passengers.

Rotorua had been bound for Wellington, but with Maitai's mails and passengers she diverted to Auckland, where she arrived on the evening of 8 January.

== Wreck ==
Maitai's wreck lies in shallow water. Above water the only surviving part of the ship is the cylinder block of her triple-expansion steam engine. What remains of her below the surface has become part of the reef. Diving on the wreck is possible only in very favourable conditions.
