= SS Ural Maru =

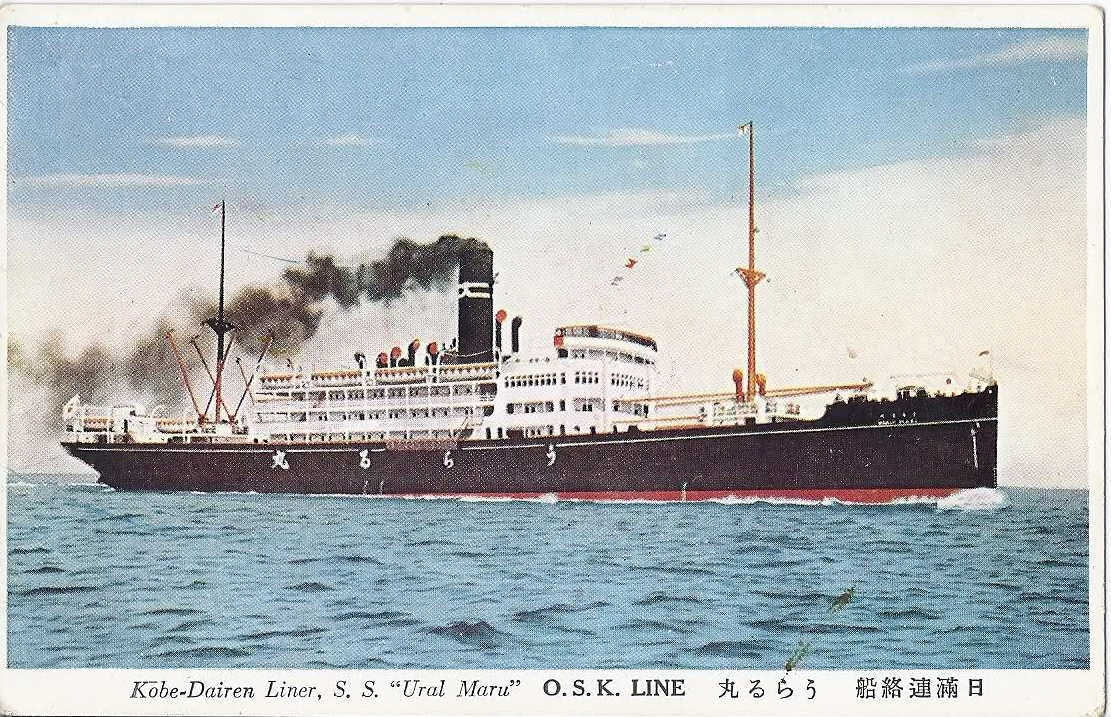
- Postcard of Ural Maru in the 1930s

History

Empire of Japan
- Name: Ural Maru
- Port of registry: Japan
- Builder: Mitsubishi Nagasaki Shipyards
- Yard number: 1-452
- Laid down: 1 May 1928
- Launched: 15 December 1928
- Completed: 30 March 1929
- Fate: Sunk, 27 September 1944

General characteristics
- Type: Cargo ship/Hospital ship
- Tonnage: 6,377 GRT
- Length: 123.32 m (404 ft 7 in) pp.
- Beam: 16.76 m (55 ft 0 in)
- Draught: 10.05 m (33 ft 0 in)
- Propulsion: steam turbines, 2 screws, 6,658 ihp (4,965 kW)
- Speed: 13.31 knots (15.3 mph; 24.7 km/h) (cruising); 17.42 knots (20.0 mph; 32.3 km/h) (flank)
- Notes: Passengers: 65 (1st class), 130 (2nd class), 583 (3rd class)

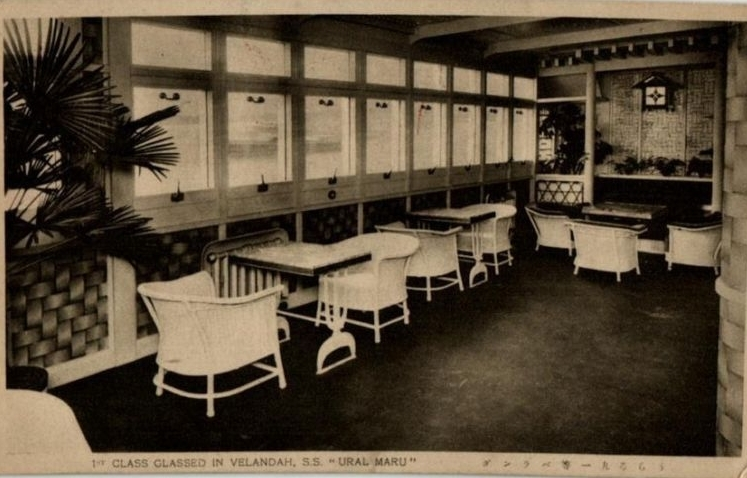
Interior of Ural Maru

Ural Maru (うらる丸, Uraru-Maru) was a 6,377-ton Japanese merchant vessel, used as a transport ship and hospital ship during World War II. She was torpedoed and sunk with the loss of some 3,700 lives on 27 September 1944.

== History ==
Ural Maru was a combined cargo/passenger vessel owned and operated by Osaka Shosen (the predecessor to Mitsui OSK Lines). She was completed in 1929 by the Mitsubishi Nagasaki Shipyards and was in regularly scheduled service between Kobe and Osaka in Japan and the port of Dairen in the Kwantung Leased Territory on the Asian mainland. Ural Maru made her first voyage on 12 April 1929.

Her civilian career was relatively uneventful, although she was damaged in Osaka by a typhoon in 1934

In 1937, after the start of the Second Sino-Japanese War, Ural Maru was requisitioned by the Imperial Japanese Army and converted into a hospital ship from 13 October 1937 to February 1938, returning sick and wounded soldiers from the front back to Japan.

Ural Maru was briefly returned to commercial service, but was requisitioned again by the Imperial Japanese Army in November 1941, and used primarily as a military transport to carry troops and military supplies from the Army’s primary staging area of Hiroshima in Japan to various ports in southeast Asia, including Manila, Saigon, Singapore, Rabaul, Rangoon and Palau in the initial stages of the war. In February 1943, she was converted to a hospital ship again, and was painted white with a large red cross, as per international regulations.

On 3 April 1943, when evacuating 50 wounded soldiers from Guadalcanal, Ural Maru was bombed by United States Army Air Forces Boeing B-17 Flying Fortress bombers and lightly damaged. She managed to return to Osaka, where the damage was much publicized. (Note: A differing record of the bomber type may be found in the Unit Diary (held in the Australian War Memorial Canberra) of 2/1 Australian Hospital Ship Manunda. In the diary there is a "Special Report" received 5 April 1943 which stated that a USAAF B-24 (Liberator) bomber from 321st Squadron, 90th Bomber Group, had on 3 April bombed and damaged hospital ship Ural Maru off New Hanover Island in the Bismark Group 300 kilometres (190 mi) northwest of Rabaul) Contemporary Japanese press labeled the attack on a clearly marked hospital ship carrying civilians as a war crime. In response to the Australian protest against the sinking of the hospital ship Centaur, the Japanese had lodged a counter-protest about attacks on, and the sinking of a number of their own hospital ships, including Ural Maru.

On her last voyage, Ural Maru had departed Singapore bound for Takao and had called on Kuching and Miri in Japanese-occupied Sarawak, where she loaded Japanese wounded, nurses and a number of "comfort women". In addition, there were ten unusual passengers – Indian National Army cadets of Indian origin on their way to Japan for military training. Only one of them died in the sinking. One of the survivors provided a first-person account of the sinking of Ural Maru in his book Burma to Japan with Azad Hind - A War Memoir. The complement of passengers is also based on his account.

Ural Maru was torpedoed in the South China Sea and sunk on 27 September 1944 by the American submarine USS Flasher approximately 240 kilometres (150 mi) west of Luzon at coordinates 15°40′N 117°18′E

== See also ==
- List by death toll of ships sunk by submarines
- List of maritime disasters in World War II
- Hikari Kikan
