= SS Sidi-Bel-Abbès (1929) =

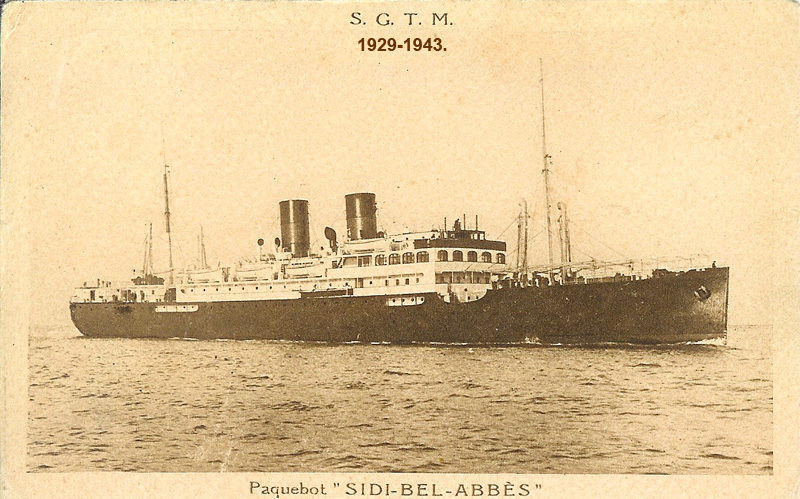

History

France
- Name: Sidi-Bel-Abbès
- Namesake: Sidi Bel Abbès
- Owner: Société Générale de Transports Maritimes à Vapeur SA
- Port of registry: (France) Marseille
- Builder: Swan, Hunter & Wigham Richardson Ltd
- Yard number: 1358
- Launched: 5 September 1929
- Completed: 27 November 1929
- Acquired: 27 November 1929
- Maiden voyage: 27 November 1929
- In service: 27 November 1929
- Out of service: 20 April 1943
- Identification: Call sign: FNBH
- Fate: Torpedoed and sunk on 20 April 1943

General characteristics
- Type: Passenger ship
- Tonnage: 4,392 GRT
- Length: 112.2 m (368 ft 1 in)
- Beam: 15.3 m (50 ft 2 in)
- Depth: 7.1 m (23 ft 4 in)
- Installed power: 6 steam turbines
- Propulsion: Double screw propellers
- Speed: 16 knots (30 km/h; 18 mph)
- Capacity: Accommodation for 1,182 passengers
- Crew: 105
- Notes: Two masts and two funnels

SS Sidi-Bel-Abbès was a French passenger ship that was torpedoed and sunk by the German submarine U-565 in the Mediterranean Sea 10 nautical miles (19 km) north of the Habibas Islands, Algeria (35°59′N 1°25′W), while she was travelling in Convoy UGS 7 from Casablanca, Morocco, to Oran, Algeria, resulting in the loss of 611 lives.

== Construction ==
Sidi-Bel-Abbès was built at the Swan Hunter shipyard in Wallsend, United Kingdom and launched on 5 September 1929 before being completed on 27 November 1929. The ship was 112.2 metres (368 ft 1 in) long, with a beam of 15.3 metres (50 ft 2 in) and a depth of 7.1 metres (23 ft 4 in). The ship was assessed at 4,392 gross register tons (GRT). She had six steam turbines driving two screws which allowed her to achieve a maximum speed of 16 knots (30 km/h; 18 mph). She had two funnels and two masts alongside accommodation for 1,182 passengers.

== Career and loss ==
Sidi-Bel-Abbès departed on her maiden voyage from Marseille to Oran on 27 November 1929 and completed the journey without incident, after which Sidi-Bel-Abbès would sail this route throughout her career. The ship was however requisitioned by the French Army on 17 September 1939 to be used as a troopship during World War II and was fitted with a 90 mm cannon at the bow and stern alongside four 13.2 mm machine guns for anti-aircraft defence on 17 December. Following the fall of France in 1940, Sidi-Bel-Abbès was anchored in the port of Oran and escaped damage when a British fleet attacked French ships at Mers El Kébir on 3 July 1940. On 18 April 1943, Sidi-Bel-Abbès departed Casablanca, Morocco, for Oran, French Algeria while carrying 41 French officers, 234 passengers, 907 Senegalese riflemen from the 4th Senegalese Tirailleurs Regiment, 105 crewmen, 50 tons of ammunition and 542 tons of oil. When the ship reached Gibraltar, she joined Convoy UGS 7 which consisted of 42 ships and were escorted by American warships. On 20 April 1943 at 6.45 am, the American oil tanker Michigan was struck by two torpedoes from the German submarine U-565 as the convoy was in the Mediterranean Sea 10 nautical miles (19 km) north of the Habibas Islands, French Algeria and began to sink. Two minutes later, a torpedo hit Sidi-Bel-Abbès in compartment number 2 which ignited the oil and resulted in her cargo of ammunition exploding before a second torpedo struck her boiler room. The explosion send flames up to 200 metres (660 ft) in the sky and destroyed the bridge while killing many men aboard the ship. The ship's bow quickly began to dip under the waves as the surviving occupants of the liner made for the stern until it rose vertically out of the water and ultimately sank as well only three minutes after the attack. Due to the fire and rapid loss of the ship, no lifeboats could be deployed and all survivors ended up in the water, many with serious burns. The struggling men were rescued by lifeboats from the previously sunk Michigan and the British naval escorts HMS Foxtrot and HMT Stella Carina before being taken to the Baudens Hospital in Oran. By 10 am, 520 men were rescued from the water, after which no more survivors were found, which meant that a total of 611 men went down with the ship of which about 100 bodies washed up on the Habibas Islands where they were buried. Three French sailors were posthumously awarded the Croix de Guerre with a bronze star for giving up their spot on a piece of wreckage to injured men after which the sailors themselves were lost at sea. A monument was erected for the lost Senegalese soldiers in Oran and a votive offering from Sidi-Bel-Abbès is displayed at Notre-Dame de la Garde church in Marseille.
