= Nakano School =

Japanese military training center

The Imperial Japanese Army Nakano School (陸軍中野学校, Rikugun Nakano Gakkō) was the primary training center for military intelligence operations by the Imperial Japanese Army during World War II.

== History ==
The Imperial Japanese Army had always placed a high priority on the use of unconventional military tactics. Before the time of the First Sino-Japanese War, Japanese operatives, posing as businessmen, and Buddhist missionaries in China, Manchuria and Russia established detailed intelligence networks for the production of maps, recruiting local support, and gathering information on opposing forces. Japanese spies would often seek to be recruited as personal servants to foreign officers or as ordinary laborers for construction projects on foreign military works. Such activities fell under the oversight of the 2nd Section of the Imperial Japanese Army General Staff Office.

In July 1938, after a number of attempts to penetrate the military of the Soviet Union had failed, and efforts to recruit White Russians had failed, Army leadership felt that a more "systematic" approach to the training of intelligence operatives was required. Lt. Col. Shun Akigusa (秋草 俊) was instructed to organize the curriculum of a special training school, to be located in 4 Chome Nakano of Nakano, Tokyo. The sign on the school read "Army Correspondence Research Center" to make the public believe that the school was focused on correspondence and not top secret training

The Nakano School was initially focused on Russia, teaching primarily Russian as a foreign language. In 1940, administration of the school was handed over to Lt. Col. Masao Ueda (上田昌雄), who in 1938 had provided considerable intelligence on Russia from his post as military attaché (a common position for Nakano graduates) in Poland.

After the attack on Pearl Harbor, and the start of World War II, the Nakano School changed its focus to southern targets. After the firebombing of Tokyo, it was relocated to Tomioka-machi, Gunma prefecture.

== Operations ==
A small school, over its history, the Nakano School had over 2500 graduates, who were trained in a variety of subject matters related to counterintelligence, military intelligence, covert operations, sabotage, foreign languages, and aikido, along with unconventional military techniques in general such as guerrilla warfare. Extended courses were provided on a wide variety of topics including philosophy, history, current events, martial arts, propaganda, and various facets of covert action.

While small, its graduates occasionally had dramatic successes, such as the intact capture of oil facilities in Palembang, Netherlands East Indies, by Nakano School-trained paratroopers. Nakano graduates were also very active in Burma, India, and Okinawa campaigns.

F Kikan, I Kikan and Minami Kikan (ja) were heavily staffed with Nakano graduates. F Kikan and I Kikan were directed against British India, and were instrumental in forming the Indian National Army and supporting the Azad Hind movement in Japanese-occupied Malaya and Singapore. It also worked with Indonesian nationalists seeking the independence of the Netherlands East Indies. Its efforts to promote anti-British and anti-Dutch movements lasted past the end of the war, and played a role in the independence of India and Indonesia.

Minami Kikan supplied and led the Burmese National Army to engage in anti-British subversion, intelligence-gathering and later direct combat against British forces in Burma.

In China, one Nakano School operation was the unsuccessful attempt to weaken China's Nationalist government by introducing large quantities of forged Chinese currency using stolen printing plates from Hong Kong.

Towards the end of the war, graduates of the Nakano School expanded their activities within Japan itself, where their training in guerilla warfare were needed to help organize civilian resistance against the prospective American invasion of the Japanese home islands.

== Post-war era ==
Although the Nakano School was abolished at the end of World War II with the surrender of Japan, many graduates continued to play significant roles in Japan's military intelligence hierarchy and the wider business community, a result of a general deal between the head of Japanese intelligence, Lieutenant General Seizo Arisue (有末精三) and General MacArthur (who wanted the Japanese intelligence on the Soviet Union).

At the start of the U. S. occupation of Japan in 1945, the four line companies and headquarters detachment of the Eighth Army's 720th Military Police Battalion was sent to Tokyo from the South Pacific and quartered in the abandoned Nakano School. In 1948, the facility was renamed Camp Burness in memory of a Battalion member who had died in a plane crash near New Guinea during the Pacific War. Later that year, after a fire destroyed the "B" Company barracks, the Battalion was moved to the former Japanese Imperial Navy Academy in the Tsukiji area of Tokyo.

Nakano School graduate Second Lieutenant Hiroo Onoda did not surrender until 1974 on Lubang Island in the Philippines. Nakano School graduate Second Lieutenant Kikuo Tanimoto volunteered for the Vietnam Independence War as an adviser in the Quang Ngai Army Academy (Vietnamese: Trường Lục quân trung học Quảng Ngãi).

== Film ==
The Nakano School has also been the subject of a number of popular fiction movies, including:

- Rikugun Nakano Gakko: Mitsumei ("Nakano Army School: Top Secret Command") (1967)
- Rikugun Nakano gakko: Kaisen zenya ("Army Nakano School: War Broke Out Last Night") (1968)
- Rikugun Nakano gakko: Kumoichigô shirei ("Army Nakano School: Cloud #1 Directive Japan") (1966)

== See also ==
- Morihei Ueshiba, taught aikido at Nakano
