= Hikari Kikan =

- Military career
- Allegiance: Japan
- Branch: Japanese army
- Conflicts: Second World War

The Hikari Kikan was the Imperial Japanese liaison office responsible for Japanese relations with the Azad Hind Government that replaced the I Kikan. It was initially headed by Colonel Bin Yamamoto, later replaced by Major General Saburo Isoda.

The Hikari Kikan recruited Ceylonese, Indians, and other South Asians domiciled in Japanese-occupied British Malaya and Singapore for espionage missions against the Allies during World War II.

== See also ==
- SS Ural Maru
