= Habibas Islands =

Islands belonging to Algeria

Îles Habibas Lighthouse
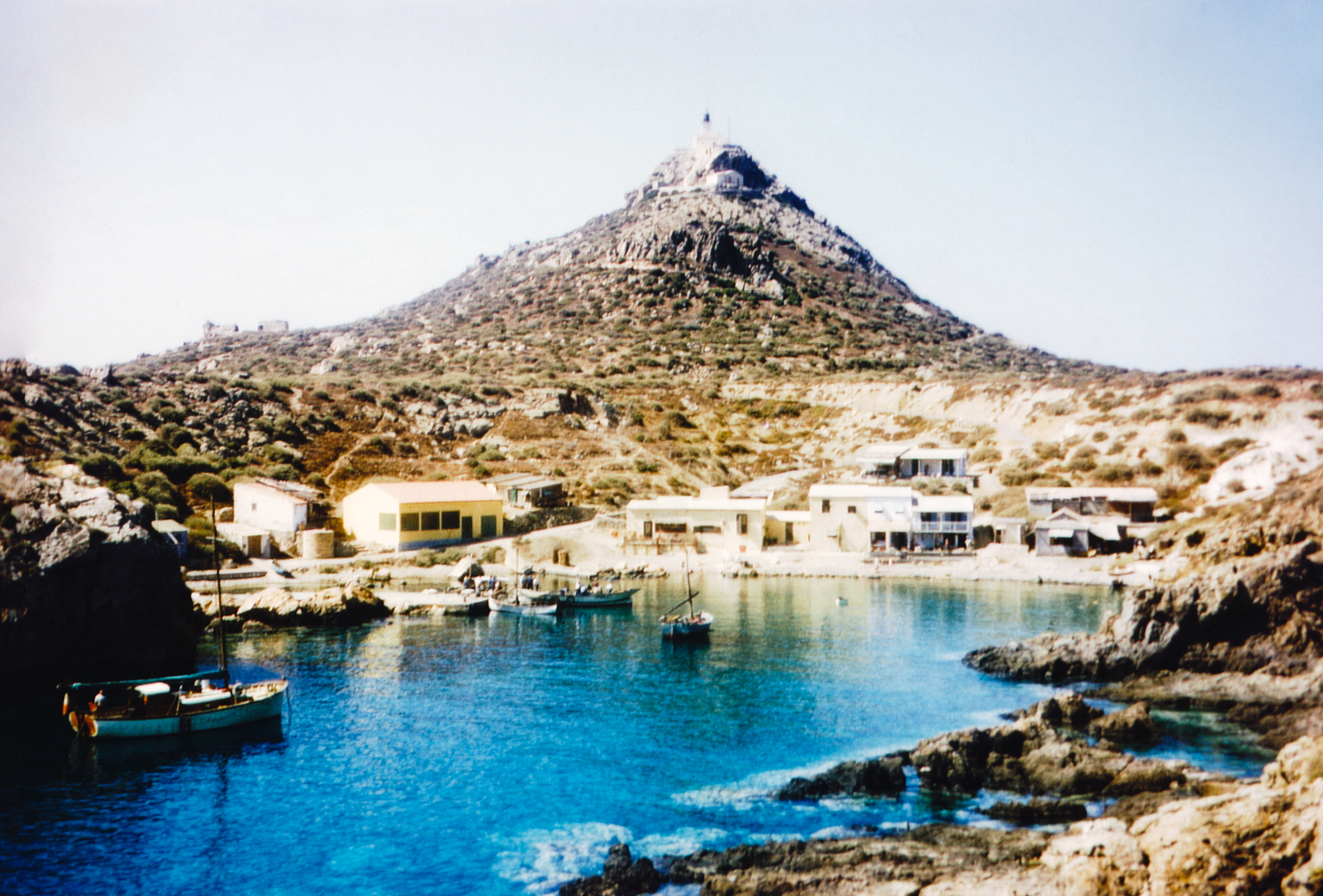
- Iles Habibas Lighthouse in 1960
- Location: Iles Habibas; Algeria
- Coordinates: 35°43′14.0″N 1°8′00.23″W

Tower
- Constructed: 1878
- Construction: masonry tower
- Height: 13.8 metres (45 ft)
- Shape: quadrangular tower with balcony and lantern atop 1-storey keeper's house
- Markings: white tower,
- Power source: solar power
- Operator: Office Nationale de Signalisation Maritime

Light
- Focal height: 113.3 metres (372 ft)
- Intensity: 180 W
- Range: 20 nautical miles (37 km; 23 mi)
- Characteristic: Fl W 5s.

The Habibas Islands (Arabic: جزر حبيبة) 35°43′29″N 1°8′00″W comprise a small archipelago of two small, rocky islands, Gharbia and Charguia, located about 12 km off the Algerian coast, north-west of Oran. Administratively, they lie within Bou Zedjar municipality in Aïn Témouchent Province, Algeria. The islands and surrounding waters constitute the Iles Habibas Marine Nature Reserve. The islands have been classified as a marine nature reserve since 2003. They have been included since 2005 on the list of Specially Protected Areas of Mediterranean Importance (SPAMI).

== Geography ==
Habibas Islands

Islands viewed from the coast

The Habibas Islands are located about 10 kilometres (6.2 mi) offshore from the Algerian coast. The archipelago comprises two main islands surrounded by rocks and islets:

- Gharbia, the larger island to the south, rising to about 105 metres (344 ft) and hosting a lighthouse;
- Charguia (or Echarguia), smaller to the north-east, rising to about 55 metres (180 ft).

The two islands are separated by a narrow channel referred to as El passo in inventory documents. The reserve includes about 40 hectares (99 acres) of emergent land and a marine protected area of about 2,684 hectares (6,630 acres).

=== Environment ===
The archipelago has been designated an Important Bird Area (IBA) by BirdLife International because it supports significant breeding populations of Audouin's gulls and Eleonora's falcons.

== Protection ==
The site falls under the responsibility of the Commissariat national du littoral (CNL). SPA/RAC documents mention conservation and monitoring actions focusing on habitats and pressures, including those linked to fishing. PIM missions have contributed to assessing the state of conservation and improving natural-history knowledge.

== Archaeology ==
The Atlas archéologique de l'Algérie (sheet 20 "Oran", note 6) reported a station of stone tools observed on the larger island, beneath the lighthouse. The same notice discussed proposed links between islands cited by ancient sources and islands along the Oran coast, and noted the conjectural character of some identifications.

== History ==
=== 15th century ===
Studies on sources relating to Pero Niño placed episodes of navigation along the Oran coast and mentioned the Habibas Islands as an insular landmark in reconstructed itineraries. An article in the Revista de Historia Naval mentioned an anchorage at the Habibas Islands ("de Alhaviba") in a return sequence towards Cartagena described from the textual tradition of Victorial.

=== 16th century ===
A study of maritime campaigns in the western Mediterranean described a recurrent itinerary of sailors of the "media luna" from Algiers to the Habibas Islands (north-west of Oran), with an initial stop "para despalmar", followed by a passage towards the Iberian Peninsula via Cape Gata.

=== 19th century ===
In the 19th century, the Habibas Islands appeared in geography works on Algeria, in which they were described as an offshore landmark. School geography manuals also mentioned the islands in descriptions of the Oran coastline and noted their isolation. An administrative notice on Algeria's maritime services listed the Habibas Islands among areas reputed for crustacean fishing within the Oran maritime district.

=== 1900 ===
A Senate publication mentioned the discussion of a bill aiming to attach "the territory of the Habibas Islands" to the commune of Oran. An Express-Finance article (20 April 1900) described an "administrative anomaly" and noted civil-status difficulties; it also reported a land surface of 37 ha 25 ares and seven inhabitants, corresponding to families of lighthouse keepers.

=== Early 20th century ===
A Tableau général of communes published by the Government General of Algeria provided a reference for the territorial organisation in the early 20th century and allowed verification of communal attachments and territorial perimeters as presented in official syntheses of the period.

=== 2000s ===
A PIM field mission documented in April 2008 produced natural-history inventories and elements for evaluating the conservation status of the site. The 2008 activity report of the Fondation Nicolas Hulot placed the mission within a programme of Mediterranean expeditions; it stated that the sailing vessel Fleur de Lampaul covered part of the route from 19 April to 24 May and that more than 40 experts were mobilised (seabirds, marine biology, botany, herpetofauna, invasive species, management). The report stated that these campaigns improved knowledge through inventories and monitoring of terrestrial and marine environments and supported exchanges of conservation practice between managers.

== Research results ==
=== Birds ===
The PIM 2008 report synthesised breeding data and noted conservation issues linked to disturbance and anthropogenic pressures on the islands and in the reserve's marine area. It also reported impacts attributed to high gull densities, with effects on vegetation and colony dynamics.

=== Reptiles ===
The PIM 2008 report recorded several reptiles on the archipelago, including Tarentola mauritanica, Chalcides ocellatus, Scelarcis perspicillata and Macroprotodon abubakeri. A reference notice by MNCN/CSIC stated that the Habibas Islands form part of the rare known insular populations of Scelarcis perspicillata. A herpetological article mentioned the Habibas Islands in the North African distribution of Psammodromus algirus.

=== Fish (2015) ===
A baseline assessment of the reserve's ichthyofauna was established following a PIM mission (September–October 2015). The report was based on underwater visual censuses and aimed to provide a reference for monitoring coastal fish assemblages.

=== Patella ferruginea ===
A recent synthesis on Patella ferruginea mentioned Algeria and reported a presence mainly associated with the Habibas Islands in distribution summaries. A census study on the Melilla coastline also mentioned earlier censuses for the Habibas Islands in a methodological comparison of sampling efforts in the western Mediterranean.

=== Ants (2024) ===
A 2024 study reported 13 ant species on the main island of the Habibas archipelago, distributed across nine genera and two subfamilies; differences in species richness among habitats were discussed and Messor capitatus was reported as strongly represented in the samples.

== Threats ==
Monitoring reports have noted anthropogenic pressures, including illegal fishing within the reserve. The PIM 2008 report also mentioned factors that may disturb ecological balances, including introduced rodents and the potential effects of high gull densities on habitats.

== See also ==
- List of lighthouses in Algeria
