= I Kikan =

The Iwakuro Kikan, or I Kikan, was an intelligence mission and liaison office for the Imperial Japanese Army and Indian National Army during the Second World War in the South-East Asian theatre. Headed by Colonel Hideo Iwakuro, it succeeded the F Kikan in liaising with the Indian Independence League and the Indian National Army under Captain Mohan Singh. After the revival of the Indian National Army under Subhas Chandra Bose, the Hikari Kikan replaced the I Kikan.
