= USS Tarpon (SS-175) =

Submarine of the United States

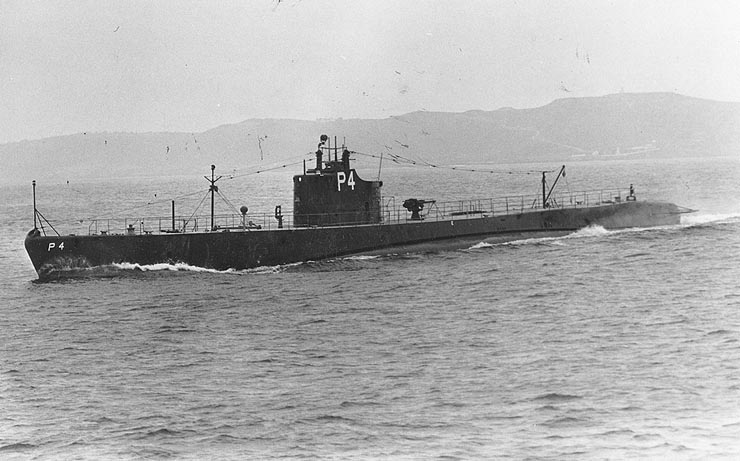
- USS Tarpon (SS-175)

History

United States
- Builder: Electric Boat Company, Groton, Connecticut
- Laid down: 22 December 1933
- Launched: 4 September 1935
- Commissioned: 12 March 1936
- Decommissioned: 15 November 1945
- Stricken: 5 September 1956
- Fate: Sold for breaking up, 8 June 1957; foundered off Cape Hatteras, 26 August 1957

General characteristics
- Class & type: Porpoise-class diesel-electric submarine
- Displacement: 1,316 tons (1,337 t) standard, surfaced; 1,968 tons (2,000 t) submerged
- Length: 287 ft 0 in (87.48 m) (waterline), 298 ft 0 in (90.83 m) (overall)
- Beam: 25 ft 3/4 in (7.639 m)
- Draft: 13 ft 9 in (4.19 m)
- Propulsion: as built; 4 × Winton Model 16-201A 16-cylinder two-cycle diesel engines, 1,300 hp (970 kW) each, driving electrical generators through reduction gears; 2 × 120-cell Exide VL31B batteries; 4 × high-speed Elliott electric motors, total 2,085 hp (1,555 kW); three General Motors six-cylinder four-cycle 6-228 auxiliary diesels; re-engined 1942; 4 × GM two-cycle Model 12-278A diesels, 1,200 hp (890 kW) each; two shafts; 4,300 shp (3.2 MW) surfaced; 2,085 shp (1.6 MW) submerged
- Speed: 19.5 knots (36 km/h) surfaced; 8.25 knots (15 km/h) submerged
- Range: 6,000 nautical miles (11,000 km) at 10 knots (19 km/h); 21,000 nautical miles (39,000 km) at 10 knots (19 km/h) with fuel in the main ballast tanks; bunkerage 85,946–86,675 US gallons (325,340–328,100 L) (Note: Sources put it at 347 tons.)
- Endurance: 10 hours at 5 knots (9.3 km/h), 36 hours at minimum speed submerged
- Test depth: 250 ft (76 m)
- Complement: 5 officers, 49 enlisted
- Armament: 6 × 21 inch (533 mm) torpedo tubes (four forward, two aft, 16 torpedoes); (two external bow torpedo tubes added 1942; total 18 torpedoes); 1 × 4 in (100 mm)/50 caliber deck gun; two .30 cal (7.62 mm) machineguns

USS Tarpon (SS-175), second United States Navy ship of this name, was a Porpoise-class diesel-electric submarine. Tarpon conducted war patrols in the Pacific Ocean during World War II.

== Construction and commissioning ==
Tarpon was laid down on 22 December 1933 at Groton, Connecticut, by the Electric Boat Corporation; launched on 4 September 1935; sponsored by Miss Eleanore Katherine Roosevelt, daughter of Assistant Secretary of the Navy Henry L. Roosevelt; and commissioned on 12 March 1936.

== Pre-war ==
Tarpon operated from San Diego and Pearl Harbor with Submarine Division 13 (SubDiv 13) for several years and was then assigned to SubDiv 14. In October 1939, SubDiv 14 was transferred to the Philippines, augmenting the six old S-boats at Manila. All submarines there were then reorganized into Submarine Squadron 5. In October 1941, SubDivs 15 and 16 were transferred from Pearl Harbor to Manila, increasing the Asiatic Fleet strength to 29 submarines. They were divided into five divisions; Tarpon was assigned to SubDiv 203.

== World War II ==
=== 1942 ===
Two days after the Japanese attacked Pearl Harbor, 18 submarines departed the Philippines on their first war patrols. Tarpon, under Lt. Comdr. Lewis Wallace, was assigned an area off southeastern Luzon. Since all the ships that she definitely identified as Japanese presented unfavorable firing angles, the submarine ended her patrol on 11 January 1942 at Darwin, Australia, without having fired a torpedo.

Tarpon got underway on 25 January for her second patrol which took her to the Moluccas. On the 30th, she sighted a convoy; but, since the enemy ships were well escorted, the submarine abandoned the chase. On 1 February, Tarpon fired a spread of four torpedoes at a freighter. One hit. She then fired two more; both hit. Her victim was apparently sinking when the submarine left the scene of the attack, but postwar analysis of Japanese records did not confirm the kill. On 11 February, while investigating a surface contact. Tarpon was illuminated by the enemy's searchlight. She dived and went deep but was severely jolted by four depth charges that knocked out her bow planes, rudder angle indicator, and port annunciator. On the night of 23 February – 24 February, Tarpon ran aground while attempting to navigate Boling Strait, west of Flores Island. Jettisoning ammunition, fresh water, fuel, and torpedoes failed to lighten the ship enough to float her off. A native boat then took an officer ashore on the island of Adonara, later returning with the only white man on the island, a Dutch missionary, Pastor H. von Den Rulst. He informed Wallace the next high tide would occur between 16:00 and 18:00. His warning that Japanese planes had been over the island during each of the past four days caused the crew a bit of uneasiness until flood tide. Then, with three engines backing, she slid off the bottom, returning to Fremantle on 5 March.

Tarpon began her third patrol on 28 March and ended at Pearl Harbor on 17 May with no contacts except a hospital ship. Her next mission, which took her north of Oahu for defense during the Battle of Midway, lasted only ten days, from 30 May to 9 June; but the submarine contacted no enemy shipping. She was then routed back to San Francisco for an overhaul which was completed on 30 September.

On 22 October, Tarpon stood out of Pearl Harbor to begin her fifth war patrol which took her to waters north of Bougainville. She sighted many fishing boats which were not worthy of a torpedo and terminated the patrol at Midway on 10 December 1942.

=== 1943 ===
Tarpon then returned to Pearl Harbor for a refit and began her next patrol from there on 10 January 1943, with Tom Wogan in command. Her assigned area was in Japanese home waters, south of Honshū. At 21:30 on 1 February, approximately 27 miles (43 km) south of Mikura-jima, the submarine fired four torpedoes at a ship and scored one hit. A follow-up attack with two torpedoes broke the 10,935-ton passenger-cargo ship Fushimi Maru in two. Four days later, Tarpon began patrolling the sea lanes leading to Truk. On 8 February, she made radar contact on a large, unidentified ship. She fired a spread of four torpedoes, and all hit the target. The submarine was forced to go deep by escorts and could not watch the 16,975-ton transport sink. The victim was the Tatsuta Maru, bound for Truk with a load of soldiers. Tarpon made no further contacts before returning to Midway on 25 February, with the highest-scoring patrol of the war so far.

Her seventh patrol, conducted from 29 March to 15 May, produced no ship contacts; but Tarpon did bombard the radio station at Taroa with her deck gun until return fire from Japanese batteries ashore prompted her to withdraw from the area.

On 30 July, Tarpon again headed for Japanese home waters. On 16 August, she sighted a Japanese task force which reportedly included an aircraft carrier of the Otaka-class (there was, in fact, no such class; intelligence had misidentified Taiyo), but its high speed prohibited an attack. (Note: Blair makes no mention of the sighting at all, and an aircraft carrier contact was sufficiently rare he would.) On the 21st, the submarine contacted two large, escorted, cargo ships. She fired a spread of three torpedoes at each and damaged both targets. (Note: Not confirmed by JANAC.) Seven days later, Tarpon damaged another freighter as it was leaving Mikura-jima. On 4 September, she sank a patrol ship with all hands and then returned to Midway on 8 September.

Tarpon conducted her ninth war patrol off the coast of Honshū from 1 October to 3 November. On the night of 16 October, she was patrolling the approaches to Yokohama when she sighted a ship which she tentatively identified as a large auxiliary. The submarine tracked the target until 01:56 the next morning when she attacked it with four torpedoes which stopped it dead in the water. However, it soon got underway again and headed straight for Tarpon. The submarine submerged, went under the ship, and attacked the target from the other side with three more torpedoes which produced one hit in the stern. The enemy still did not sink, so Tarpon fired again with a torpedo which struck the target in the same place as the first. The vessel exploded and disappeared. Postwar examination of enemy records revealed that the victim was the German raider Michel (Schiff 28) which had been preying on Allied shipping in both the Atlantic and the Pacific. Michel was the only German raider sunk by a United States submarine in the Pacific.

Four days later, Tarpon contacted an aircraft carrier and a destroyer. She made a submerged approach and fired four torpedoes at the carrier. However, both ships increased speed and avoided the torpedoes. On the morning of 23 October, the submarine made radar contact on two ships and fired five torpedoes at the larger target. All apparently passed under the freighter. The submarine returned to Pearl Harbor on 3 November.

Tarpon's next war patrol, a photo reconnaissance of various atolls in the Marshall Islands group from 4 December 1943 to 12 January 1944, was largely uneventful. She did get an opportunity at an inter-island tanker and fired two torpedoes, but both missed and the vessel escaped.

=== 1944 ===
From 19 June to 8 August, Tarpon performed lifeguard duty in the Truk area, but made no rescues. On 14 July, she fired three torpedoes at what was thought to be an inter-island freighter. All missed, and the ship turned out to be a disguised antisubmarine ship. Tarpon went deep to evade the depth charges and cleared the area. On the 25th, she made radar contact on a small convoy and fired three torpedoes at the largest ship. All missed, and the submarine closed to engage with her deck guns. After the second shot, the gun jammed, and only the machine guns continued firing. Tarpon withdrew to clear the gun and then returned to the attack. She inflicted considerable damage on the enemy ship before she was outgunned and forced to break off the engagement.

Tarpon's final war patrol, from 31 August to 14 October, consisted of lifeguard duty in the Truk area. When she returned to Pearl Harbor, she was ordered to the east coast of the United States. The submarine departed Pearl Harbor on Christmas Eve, 1944, and arrived at New London, Connecticut, on 17 January 1945.

== Post-war ==
After operations on the United States East Coast, Tarpon was decommissioned at Boston on 15 November 1945. Early in 1947, the submarine was scheduled for duty as a Naval Reserve training ship. Tarpon left Boston under tow on 28 March and arrived at New Orleans on 9 April and was placed in service there on the 17th. She served as a training submarine in the 8th Naval District until placed out of service and stricken from the Navy list on 5 September 1956.

Tarpon foundered in deep water, south of Cape Hatteras, North Carolina, on 26 August 1957, while under tow to the scrap yard. Her wreck is located at 34°45.195′N 75°46.025′W.

== Honors and awards ==
- Asiatic-Pacific Campaign Medal with seven battle stars for World War II service

== In media ==
- "Secrets of the Shark," a 1991 episode of the PBS television series Return to the Sea, includes a segment centered around a dive on the wreck of Tarpon.
