= MV Asama Maru =

Japanese ocean liner

Coordinates: 20.2833°N 117.633°E

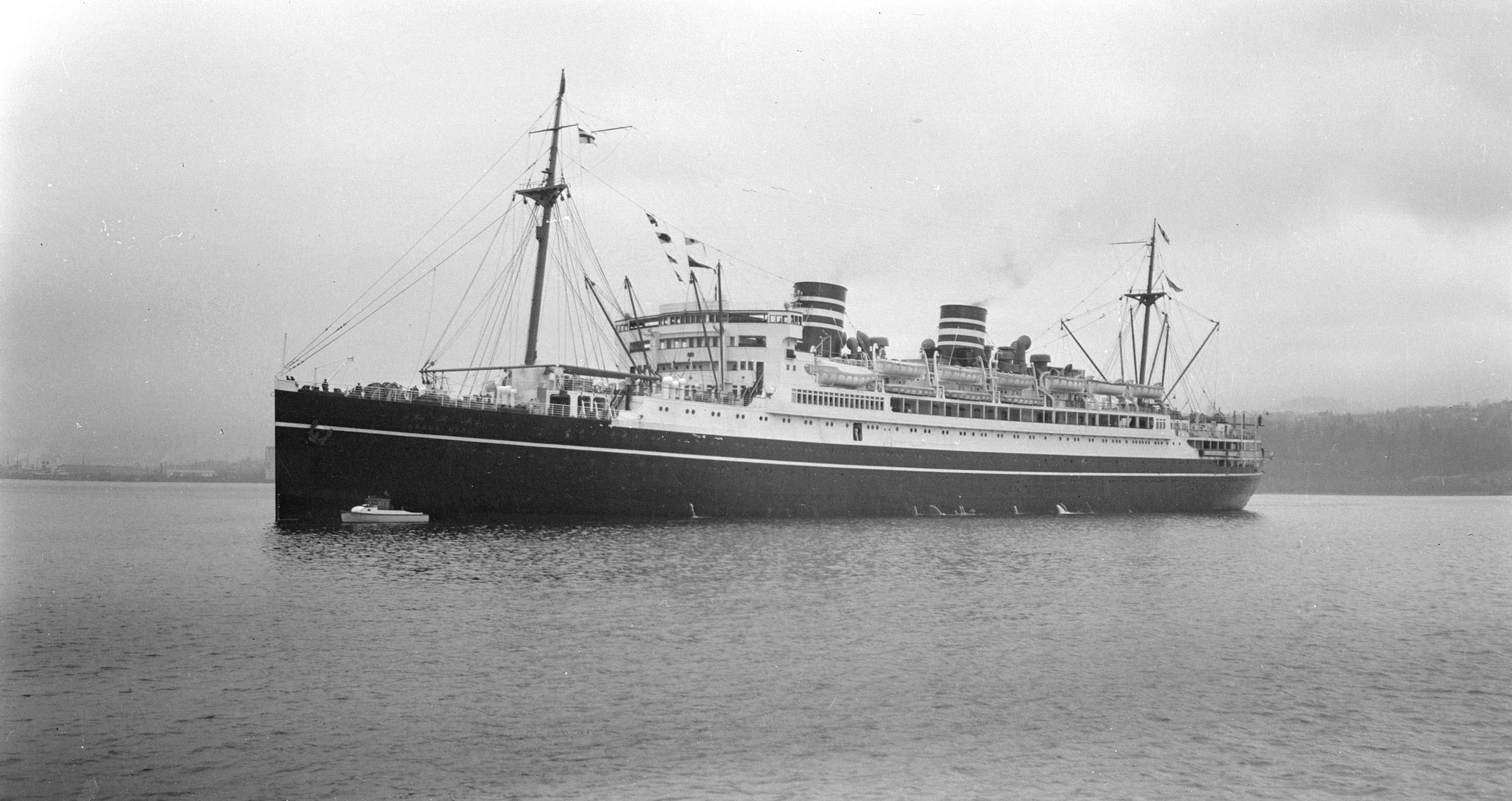
- Asama Maru in 1936.

History

Japan
- Name: Asama Maru
- Operator: Nippon Yusen (NYK)
- Builder: Mitsubishi Shipbuilding & Engineering Co. Nagasaki, Japan
- Yard number: 450
- Laid down: 10 September 1927
- Launched: 30 October 1928
- Completed: 15 September 1929
- In service: 11 October 1929
- Out of service: 1 November 1944
- Fate: Torpedoed and sunk in the South China Sea, 100 mi (160 km) south of Pratas Island

General characteristics
- Tonnage: 16,975 GRT
- Length: 178 m (584 ft 0 in)
- Beam: 21.9 m (71 ft 10 in)
- Draft: 8.7 m (28.5 ft)
- Propulsion: 4 Mitsubishi-Sulzer diesels, quadruple screws
- Speed: 21 knots (39 km/h; 24 mph)
- Capacity: 222 first class; 96 second class; 504 third class; 822 total
- Crew: 330
- Notes: Steel construction

Asama Maru (浅間丸, Asama maru) was a Japanese ocean liner owned by Nippon Yusen Kaisha (NYK). The ship was built in 1927–1929 by Mitsubishi Shipbuilding & Engineering Co. at Nagasaki, Japan. The vessel was named after an important Shinto shrine.

Asama Maru set a record on her maiden voyage to California, and surpassed this record on her fourth voyage from Yokohama to San Francisco.

== Background ==
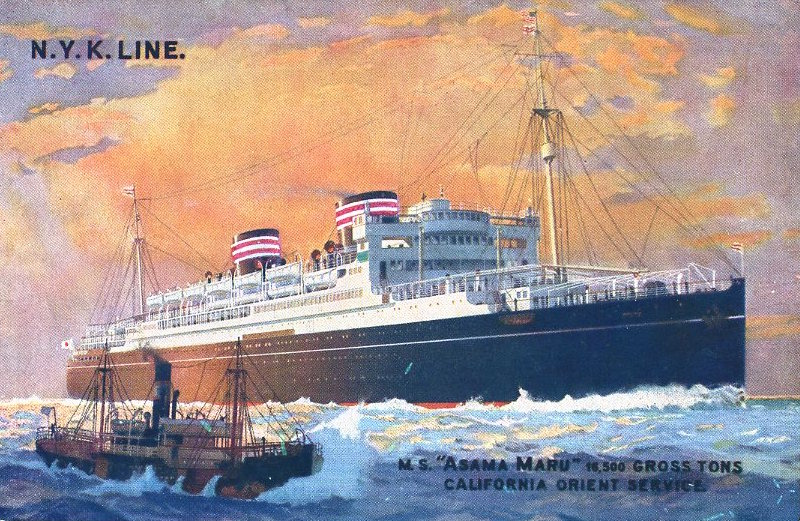
Asama Maru in a 1930s postcard

Asama Maru and her sister ships Tatsuta Maru and Chichibu Maru were built for NYK's premier high-speed trans-Pacific Orient-California fortnightly service, coming into operation from late 1929. In NYK advertising these ships were characterized as "The Queen of the Sea." Principal ports-of-call included Hong Kong, Shanghai, Kobe, Yokohama, Honolulu, Los Angeles, and San Francisco. The trip from Yokohama to San Francisco typically took 15 days, with fares starting from $190 in second class and from $315 in first class.

== Details ==
NYK Line brochure, 1929

The 16,975-ton vessel had a length of 583 feet (178 m), and a beam of 71 feet (22 m). The ship had four Mitsubishi-Sulzer diesel engines, two funnels, two masts, quadruple screws and a service speed of 21 knots (39 km/h; 24 mph). Only one funnel was actually necessary, but a second one was added for the sake of appearance.

Asama Maru provided accommodation for 222 first-class passengers and for 96 second-class passengers. There was also room for up to 504 third-class passengers. The ship and passengers were served by a crew of 330.

== Civilian career ==
=== Early career ===
She was laid down on 10 September 1927 at Mitsubishi Shipbuilding & Engineering Co. Nagasaki, Japan, with yard number 450. Asama Maru was launched on 30 October 1928 and left Yokohama on 11 October 1929 on her maiden voyage to California, arriving on 24 October. During a subsequent crossing, upon arrival in San Francisco on 14 December 1930, US Customs agents seized a large amount of opium during festivities marking the ship's first anniversary of Trans-Pacific service.

In August 1932, Asama Maru transported the Japanese Olympic team to Los Angeles for the 1932 Summer Olympics. While at Los Angeles, Baron Takeichi Nishi, the gold medalist, entertained his friends, Douglas Fairbanks and Mary Pickford.

During a voyage departing from San Francisco on 1 April 1937, Asama Maru carried Helen Keller with a message of good will from President Franklin D. Roosevelt. Disaster struck Asama Maru during the 1937 Great Hong Kong typhoon. While anchored at Kowloon Bay in Hong Kong on the night of 2 September, high winds ripped Asama Maru from her moorings and drove her into Chai Wan Bay, where she grounded. She was subsequently rammed by SS Conte Verde, an 18,765-ton Italian passenger liner which had also broken loose from her moorings. She was refloated on 12 September after two of her engines and other items were removed to reduce weight, and repaired at Nagasaki from 2 April through 15 September.

=== The Asama Maru incident ===
On a voyage departing from San Francisco on 6 January 1940 Asama Maru had 51 German citizens on her passenger manifest. On 21 January, she was intercepted in international waters 35 miles (56 km) from Nozaki Lighthouse, at the southern tip of the Bōsō Peninsula by the Royal Navy light cruiser HMS Liverpool. The British had received intelligence that crewmen from the scuttled German liner Columbus who had escaped to the United States had taken passage on Asama Maru in an attempt to return to Germany. In direct violation of Japan's neutrality and international law, the British Government had authorised the Commander-in-Chief, China Station to board, provided that the coast of Japan was not within sight. She initially refused to stop, but was forced to do so after Liverpool fired a blank round. An armed boarding party removed 21 of the ship's passengers, all former officers or technicians of Standard Oil tankers, claiming that they were German military personnel The Government of Japan formally protested the action, on the basis of Article 47, of the 1909 London Declaration, which states that only persons actually enlisted in the armed services of belligerent nations could be removed from the ships of neutral countries. Moreover, the fact that the incident had occurred so close to the shores of Japan further escalated tensions between the two countries. Despite the upsurge in anti-British sentiment in Japan, the government of Prime Minister Mitsumasa Yonai took a more conciliatory approach. In return for promising not to offer passage to certain categories of military age Germans in the future, the British agreed to return some of the detained passengers. On 29 February, as Asama Maru was departing Yokohama, nine of the previously captured German civilians were returned to Asama Maru by the British armed merchant cruiser HMAS Kanimbla.

=== Later civilian career ===
On 25 October 1940, Asama Maru departed San Francisco. During this voyage, 14 crewmen (six officers and eight sailors) of Columbus, travelling in disguise as American students were on board, and reached Yokohama on 12 November.

On 4 February 1941, she transported Polish Jewish refugees from Yokohama to the United States, making a similar voyage on 20 April. On 29 June 1941, she was chartered by the German government to evacuate 666 German and Italian nationals detained in the Netherlands East Indies following the Axis invasion of the Netherlands.

On 18 July 1941, Asama Maru departed Yokohama with only 98 passengers, 47 of whom were Japanese-Americans born in the United States. However, on 24 July, in mid-Pacific, Asama Maru received orders to heave to and stop. On 26 July, US President Franklin D. Roosevelt signed an executive order to seize Japanese assets in the United States in retaliation for the Japanese invasion of French Indochina. That evening, the crew of Asama Maru painted her funnels black and painted out the Japanese flags on her hull and deck. On 27 July, a notice was posted that the ship was ordered back to Japan; however, after 36 hours, another notice was posted stating that the ship would resume her original course, and she docked in Honolulu on 31 July. She departed Honolulu for San Francisco on 1 August; however, on 4 August she was again recalled to Japan, arriving back at Yokohama on 10 August.

On 30 August, Asama Maru transported 350 Polish Jewish refugees who had arrived in Japan via Siberia from Kobe to Shanghai, where they were received by the Shanghai Ghetto. On 6 November, she departed for Singapore to evacuate 450 Japanese civilians, arriving in Kobe on 26 November. This was to be her last civilian voyage, as she was requisitioned by the Imperial Japanese Navy on 30 November.

== Military career ==
At the time of the Attack on Pearl Harbor, Asama Maru was serving as a troopship and had just arrived at Saipan. In early 1942, she made several voyages between Japan and the Philippines and Borneo, including the transport of the paratroopers of the 3rd Yokosuka Special Naval Landing Force to Tarakan in Borneo on 16 January 1942.

In June 1942, Asama Maru was temporarily designated a diplomatic exchange vessel, and was used in the repatriation of the prewar diplomatic staffs of Japan and the Allied nations. She departed Yokohama on 25 June with US Ambassador Joseph Grew and 430 other American diplomats, along with members of the Spanish embassy in Japan. On reaching Hong Kong on 29 June, she embarked an additional 377 Americans, Canadians and other Allied nationals who had been held for 44 months at the Stanley Internment Camp. She took on 114 repatriates on 3 July at Saigon, and yet more in Singapore on 6 July, so that when she reached Lourenço Marques in Portuguese East Africa on 22 July, she was carrying 789 civilians. These were exchanged for 1500 Japanese and Siamese diplomats (including Ambassador Kichisaburo Nomura and Saburō Kurusu), businessmen and journalists in the United States and Brazil at the time of the outbreak of war, who had been transported to this location aboard MS Gripsholm. She returned to Yokohama on 20 August, and was requisitioned again by the Imperial Japanese Navy on 5 September.

Asama Maru was placed back in service as a troopship and transport, shuttling men and supplies from Japan to various points in Southeast Asia. On 10 October, she was assigned to carry 1000 Allied prisoners of war from Makassar to Nagasaki. This was the first of several voyages to transport Allied prisoners, which would later earn Asama Maru the epithet of "hell ship." In February 1943, Asama Maru was fitted with a hydrophone and rack for 16 depth charges. She narrowly escaped four torpedoes fired at her by USS Sunfish on 10 March off of Takao (now Kaohsiung), but was alerted in time by her hydrophone operator and was able to take evasive action.

On 23 February 1944, she was slightly damaged in an attack by USS Grayback (SS-208) in the South China Sea 20 miles (32 km) east of Formosa. The oiler Nanpo Maru was sunk by Grayback in the same attack.

In October 1944, Asama Maru was one of the ships in a major convoy transporting elements of the Imperial Japanese Army’s 1st Division from China to the Philippines. Despite constant attacks by American submarines and aircraft, over 12,000 men were successfully sent to reinforce the Japanese garrison at Luzon prior to the American landings. On the return voyage from Manila to Takao, Asama Maru embarked 1,383 military and civilian personnel, including survivors of sunken merchant vessels, as well as 170 tons of scrap iron, 80 tons of hemp, 80 tons of raw rubber and other supplies. On 1 November, the convoy was attacked in the Bashi Channel by USS Atule in the South China Sea 100 miles (160 km) south of the island of Pratas. Asama Maru was torpedoed twice in the starboard side, hitting both the main and the auxiliary engine rooms. A few minutes later, two more torpedoes in the starboard side exploded to flood the No.3 and No.4 holds. Asama Maru sank stern first less than ten minutes later. Survivors rescued included 103 men from her 201-man crew and 1028 of her 1383 passengers.

== See also ==
- List of ocean liners
- Asama Shrine
- Foreign commerce and shipping of Empire of Japan
