= SS Arabia Maru (1918) =

History

Japan
- Name: Arabia Maru
- Owner: Osaka Shosen K. K. - OSK Line
- Port of registry: (Empire of Japan) Osaka
- Builder: Mitsubishi Heavy Industries
- Yard number: 271
- Laid down: 19 May 1918
- Launched: 30 March 1919
- Completed: 30 April 1919
- Acquired: 30 April 1919
- In service: 30 April 1919
- Out of service: 18 October 1944
- Identification: Official number: 22226; Call sign: JEGD
- Fate: Torpedoed and sunk on 18 October 1944

General characteristics
- Type: Passenger ship
- Tonnage: 9,414 GRT
- Length: 144.8 m (475 ft 1 in)
- Beam: 18.6 m (61 ft 0 in)
- Depth: 12.4 m (40 ft 8 in)
- Decks: 3
- Installed power: Two 3 cyl. triple expansion steam engines
- Propulsion: Double screw propellers
- Speed: 14 knots (26 km/h; 16 mph)
- Capacity: Accommodation for 356 passengers (42 in First class & 314 in Steerage)
- Crew: 105
- Notes: Two masts and a single funnel

SS Arabia Maru was a Japanese passenger ship that was torpedoed and sunk on 18 October 1944 by the United States Navy submarine USS Bluegill in the South China Sea 25 kilometres (16 mi) north west of Lubang Island, Philippines at 14°06′N 119°40′E, while she was travelling in convoy, resulting in the loss of 1,747 lives.

== Construction ==
Arabia Maru was laid down on 19 May 1918 at the Mitsubishi Heavy Industries shipyard in Nagasaki, Japan. She was launched on 30 March 1919 and completed on 30 April 1919. The ship was 144.8 metres (475 ft 1 in) long, with a beam of 18.6 metres (61 ft 0 in) and a depth of 12.4 metres (40 ft 8 in). The ship was assessed at 9,414 gross register tons (GRT). She had two three-cylinder triple expansion steam engines rated at 998 indicated horsepower (744 kW), driving two screws which allowed her to achieve a maximum speed of 14 knots (26 km/h; 16 mph). Her five coal-fired boilers were replaced by oil-fired ones in 1924. She had a single funnel and two masts alongside accommodation for 356 passengers which included 42 in First class and 314 in Steerage.

== Early career ==
Arabia Maru departed on her maiden voyage from Hong Kong to Tacoma via Kobe on 30 April 1919 and completed the journey without incident, after which Arabia Maru would sail this route until she was assigned to the South America route in 1931. Arabia Maru was involved in several maritime incidents, the first of which occurred on 6 March 1930 when Arabia Maru collided with Kasagi Maru in Kobe Harbour, suffering light damage to her lifeboat stations and aft deck. Arabia Maru was involved in another collision on 1 February 1931 Off Kannonzaki Lighthouse in Tokyo Bay with the Takao Maru. This time Arabia Maru's engine room flooded and the ship was grounded on muddy sand off Onuki Town to save her from sinking. The ship was refloated on 5 February 1931 and towed to Yokohama where a fire broke out in her engine room on 10 February while she was being repaired. The fire was successfully extinguished after the ship was taken out of the harbour. Arabia Maru would go on to carry many Japanese immigrants to Brazil during the 1930s until the ship was requisitioned by the Imperial Japanese Army on 21 November 1941 and converted into a hospital- and troopship.

== World War II career ==
Arabia Maru participated in the Japanese Invasion of Malaya in December 1941 and landed troops at Kota Bharu on 16 December. The ship made for Saigon on 20 December, where she arrived on 22 December and was painted white overall with a green stripe and red crosses as was required for hospital ships to distinguish them from other shipping as to spare them from enemy attacks. Arabia Maru took part in the convoy that was used in Japanese Invasion of Eastern Java in February 1942. Arabia Maru sailed in many convoys during the Pacific War, but found herself sailing up the Rangoon River to Rangoon Harbour by herself on New Year's Day 1943, when an American B-24 heavy bomber aircraft attacked the ship that was steaming at a low speed without the ability to take evasive action. Despite this, the B-24's bomb just missed Arabia Maru and instead struck the river, but the near miss still managed to inflict slight damage to the ship. This did not prevent the ship from reaching the harbour half an hour after the attack, where she underwent emergency repairs before returning to service on 6 January. Arabia Maru took part in Convoy No. 113-MA-07, which departed Moji on 11 November 1943 and was attacked two days later by the American submarine USS Trigger. Nachisan Maru was sunk in the attack with the loss of 46 lives while the other ships, including Arabia Maru, escaped without damage and reached their destination on 21 November 1943. Arabia Maru was involved in her first war time maritime incident when she struck a mine off Takao on 6 April 1944, but the ship was saved from sinking and subsequently repaired. Arabia Maru was part of another convoy that was attacked on 9 August 1944 and saw the loss of the cargo ship Yagi Maru by the American submarine USS Barbel, Arabia Maru once again escaped the attack unharmed after increasing her speed and taking evasive action while USS Barbel was depth charged.

== Loss ==
Arabia Maru departed on a routine Taih (Refugee) convoy trip from Manila on 17 October 1944 at 6.20 pm alongside 11 other transport ships and their four escort ships. Arabia Maru was carrying 1,870 troops, 765 passengers, 30 horses, 500 cubic metres (18,000 cu ft) of aircraft parts and 550 cubic metres (19,000 cu ft) of oil pipes on this voyage. The following day, as the convoy was in the South China Sea 25 kilometres (16 mi) north west of Lubang Island, Philippines, the American submarine USS Bluegill fired two torpedoes at Arabia Maru which struck her engine room and hold No. 4. As Arabia Maru was slowly sinking, she was struck by two more torpedoes in her bow and hold No. 2, causing her to quickly capsize and sink with the loss of 1,747 lives. The 888 survivors were rescued by Hakko Maru, CH-21 and PB-104 and returned to Manila. The rest of the convoy continued their journey and were again attacked that night by Bluegill and USS Raton, resulting in the sinking of Shiranesan Maru, Hakushika Maru, Taikai Maru, and Chinzei Maru with a great loss of life.

== Wreck ==
The wreck of Arabia Maru lies at 14°06′N 119°40′E, but the current condition of the wreck is unknown.
