= SM UC-54 =

1916 German type UC II minelaying U-boat

History

German Empire
- Name: UC-54
- Ordered: 12 January 1916
- Builder: Germaniawerft, Kiel
- Yard number: 270
- Launched: 20 March 1917
- Commissioned: 10 May 1917
- Fate: Scuttled at Trieste, 28 October 1918

General characteristics
- Class & type: Type UC II submarine
- Displacement: 434 t (427 long tons), surfaced; 511 t (503 long tons), submerged
- Length: 52.69 m (172 ft 10 in) o/a; 40.96 m (134 ft 5 in) pressure hull
- Beam: 5.22 m (17 ft 2 in) o/a; 3.65 m (12 ft) pressure hull
- Draught: 3.64 m (11 ft 11 in)
- Propulsion: 2 × propeller shafts; 2 × 6-cylinder, 4-stroke diesel engines, 580–600 PS (430–440 kW; 570–590 shp); 2 × electric motors, 620 PS (460 kW; 610 shp)
- Speed: 11.8 knots (21.9 km/h; 13.6 mph), surfaced; 7.2 knots (13.3 km/h; 8.3 mph), submerged
- Range: 8,820–9,450 nmi (16,330–17,500 km; 10,150–10,870 mi) at 7 knots (13 km/h; 8.1 mph) surfaced; 56 nmi (104 km; 64 mi) at 4 knots (7.4 km/h; 4.6 mph) submerged
- Test depth: 50 m (160 ft)
- Complement: 26
- Armament: 6 × 100 cm (39.4 in) mine tubes; 18 × UC 200 mines; 3 × 50 cm (19.7 in) torpedo tubes (2 bow/external; one stern); 7 × torpedoes; 1 × 8.8 cm (3.5 in) Uk L/30 deck gun
- Notes: 30-second diving time

Service record
- Part of: Mittelmeer / Mittelmeer II Flotilla; 28 July 1917 – 28 October 1918
- Commanders: Kptlt. Heinrich XXXVII Prinz Reuß zu Köstritz; 10 May 1917 – 21 May 1918; Oblt.z.S. Otto Loycke; 22 May – 28 October 1918
- Operations: 8 patrols
- Victories: 16 merchant ships sunk (52,039 GRT); 2 auxiliary warships sunk (526 GRT); 3 merchant ships damaged (12,766 GRT)

SM UC-54 was a German Type UC II minelaying submarine or U-boat in the German Imperial Navy (German: Kaiserliche Marine) during World War I. The U-boat was ordered on 12 January 1916 and was launched on 20 March 1917. She was commissioned into the German Imperial Navy on 10 May 1917 as SM UC-54. (Note: "SM" stands for "Seiner Majestät" (English: His Majesty's) and combined with the U for Unterseeboot would be translated as His Majesty's Submarine.) In eight patrols UC-54 was credited with sinking 18 ships, either by torpedo or by mines laid. UC-54 was scuttled at Trieste on 28 October 1918 on the surrender of Austria-Hungary.

== Design ==
A Type UC II submarine, UC-54 had a displacement of 434 tonnes (427 long tons) when at the surface and 511 tonnes (503 long tons) while submerged. She had a length overall of 52.69 m (172 ft 10 in), a beam of 5.22 m (17 ft 2 in), and a draught of 3.64 m (11 ft 11 in). The submarine was powered by two six-cylinder four-stroke diesel engines each producing 290–300 metric horsepower (210–220 kW; 290–300 shp) (a total of 580–600 metric horsepower (430–440 kW; 570–590 shp)), two electric motors producing 620 metric horsepower (460 kW; 610 shp), and two propeller shafts. She had a dive time of 48 seconds and was capable of operating at a depth of 50 metres (160 ft).

The submarine had a maximum surface speed of 11.8 knots (21.9 km/h; 13.6 mph) and a submerged speed of 7.2 knots (13.3 km/h; 8.3 mph). When submerged, she could operate for 56 nautical miles (104 km; 64 mi) at 4 knots (7.4 km/h; 4.6 mph); when surfaced, she could travel 8,820 to 9,450 nautical miles (16,330 to 17,500 km; 10,150 to 10,870 mi) at 7 knots (13 km/h; 8.1 mph). UC-54 was fitted with six 100 centimetres (39 in) mine tubes, eighteen UC 200 mines, three 50 centimetres (20 in) torpedo tubes (one on the stern and two on the bow), seven torpedoes, and one 8.8 cm (3.5 in) Uk L/30 deck gun. Her complement was twenty-six crew members.

== Summary of raiding history ==
Date	Name	Nationality	Tonnage (Note: Merchant ship tonnages are in gross register tons. Military vessels are listed by tons displacement.)	Fate
4 July 1917	Hurstside	United Kingdom	3,149	Sunk
12 July 1917	Maija	Russian Empire	164	Sunk
13 July 1917	Loanda	Portugal	141	Sunk
26 July 1917	Roberto Ivens	Portuguese Navy	281	Sunk
7 September 1917	Myrmidon	United Kingdom	4,965	Damaged
29 January 1918	Tosho Maru	Japan	3,038	Sunk
2 February 1918	Esterel	Kingdom of Italy	238	Sunk
2 February 1918	Ida	Kingdom of Italy	63	Sunk
6 February 1918	Glenartney	United Kingdom	7,263	Sunk
14 March 1918	Ardandearg	United Kingdom	3,237	Sunk
27 March 1918	Carlo P.	Kingdom of Italy	61	Sunk
3 April 1918	Sylvie	France	2,148	Sunk
3 May 1918	Pancras	United Kingdom	4,436	Damaged
11 May 1918	Sant Anna	French Navy	9,350	Sunk
12 May 1918	Vimeira	United Kingdom	5,884	Sunk
16 May 1918	Marie Frederique	French Navy	245	Sunk
13 July 1918	Ponta Delgada	Portugal	3,381	Sunk
19 July 1918	Australien	France	6,377	Sunk
19 July 1918	Polperro	United Kingdom	3,365	Damaged
4 September 1918	Arum	United Kingdom	3,681	Sunk
23 September 1918	Edlington	United Kingdom	3,864	Sunk
