= List of shipwrecks in September 1944 =

The list of shipwrecks in September 1944 includes ships sunk, foundered, grounded, or otherwise lost during September 1944.

== 1 September ==
List of shipwrecks: 1 September 1944
Ship	State	Description
Aura	Norway	World War II: The coaster (186 GRT) struck a mine and sank at Lepsøyrev, Norway. Everyone was rescued, but one crew died from his injuries the next day.
Capo Lena	Germany	The cargo ship was scuttled on the Charpentier Reef, off Saint-Nazaire, Loire-Inférieure, France. The wreck was raised in 1946 and broken up.
F 198	Kriegsmarine	The Type B Marinefahrprahm foundered on this date.
F 539	Kriegsmarine	World War II: The Type CM Marinefahrprahm minelayer was sunk by artillery fire on the Danube near Gruia, Romania.
HMS Hurst Castle	Royal Navy	World War II: Convoy CU 36: The Castle-class corvette (1,010 GRT, 1944) was torpedoed and sunk in the Atlantic Ocean off Tory Island, County Donegal, Ireland (55°27′N 8°12′W) by U-482 (Kriegsmarine) with the loss of 17 of her 124 crew. Survivors were rescued by HMS Ambuscade (Royal Navy).
Ina Maru	Imperial Japanese Navy	World War II: The auxiliary naval vessel (853 GRT) was torpedoed and sunk in the Pacific Ocean north west of Chichijima (30°26′N 140°53′E) by USS Pilotfish (United States Navy) with the loss of 30 crew.
Kehdingen	Kriegsmarine	World War II: The weather ship was intercepted by USCGC Northland (United States Coast Guard) and scuttled in the Greenland Sea (76°30′N 19°02′W). All 17 crew and 11 passengers (a meteorological team) were captured.
HMS MMS 117	Royal Navy	World War II: The MMS-class minesweeper (225 GRT) was sunk by a mine off Civitavecchia, Italy. 17 crew were killed. There was only one survivor.
Oituz	Romania	World War II: The cargo ship was torpedoed and sunk at Constanţa by U-23 (Kriegsmarine). Later refloated but declared a total loss.
S 80	Kriegsmarine	World War II: The Type 1939/40 motor torpedo boat (93 GRT) was sunk by a mine in the Baltic Sea off Vyborg. Five crew were killed.
SF 109	Kriegsmarine	World War II: The Siebel ferry was sunk by Allied fighter-bombers in Lukovo Bay, Croatia.
SF 262	Kriegsmarine	World War II: The Siebel ferry was sunk by Allied fighter-bombers in Lukovo Bay, Croatia.
Sekino Maru	Imperial Japanese Army	World War II: The Sekino Maru-class auxiliary transport (997 GRT) was sunk in the Lembeh Strait, in the Celebes Sea (01°06′N 122°21′E) by US Navy land-based aircraft. One crew was killed.
Tientsin Maru	Japan	World War II: The cargo ship struck a mine and sank in the East China Sea off Woosung, China.
Troilus	United Kingdom	World War II: The cargo ship (7,422 GRT) was torpedoed and sunk in the Arabian Sea 300 nautical miles (560 km) north east of Socotra Island, South Yemen (14°10′N 61°04′E) by U-859 (Kriegsmarine) with the loss of four crew and two passengers. The 95 survivors were rescued by HMS Nadder and HMS Taff (both Royal Navy).
U-247	Kriegsmarine	World War II: The Type VIIC submarine (1,070 GRT) was depth charged and sunk in the English Channel (49°54′N 5°49′W) by HMCS Saint John and HMCS Swansea (both Royal Canadian Navy) with the loss of all 52 crew.
USS YMS-21	United States Navy	World War II: The YMS-1-class minesweeper (270 GRT) was sunk by a mine in the Mediterranean Sea in Toulon Inner Harbor, Var, France (43°06′N 05°54′E). Two crew were killed. There were 31 survivors, four being wounded.

== 2 September ==
List of shipwrecks: 2 September 1944
Ship	State	Description
AF 70	Kriegsmarine	World War II: The Artilleriefährprahm was torpedoed and sunk in the English Channel off Cap Gris Nez, Pas-de-Calais, France by Royal Navy motor torpedo boats.
Empire Curzon	United Kingdom	The cargo ship (7,067 GRT, 1944) was driven ashore in the Seine Bay in gales. She struck the wreck of Iddesleigh (United Kingdom). She was later refloated and towed to the United Kingdom. Declared a constructive total loss, she was laid up until December 1945 and then scrapped.
Fjordheim	Norway	World War II: Convoy ON 251: The cargo ship (4,115 GRT) was torpedoed and sunk in the Atlantic Ocean (55°20′N 9°58′W) by U-482 (Kriegsmarine) with the loss of three of her 38 crew. Survivors were rescued by Empire Mallory (United Kingdom) and HMCS Montreal (Royal Canadian Navy).
HMS Glen Avon	Royal Navy	The auxiliary anti-aircraft vessel (509 GRT), a former paddle minesweeper, foundered in a storm at her moorings in Seine Bay, Normandy. 15 crew drowned.
HMS LCP(L) 71	Royal Navy	The landing craft personnel (large) (5,9/8,2 t, 1941) was lost on this date.
T-410 Vzryv	Soviet Navy	World War II: The minesweeper was torpedoed and sunk in the Black Sea east of Varna, Romania (43°51′N 29°12′E) by U-19 (Kriegsmarine). All officers, 53 sailors and 22 troops carried aboard were lost.
Toso Maru No. 1	Japan	World War II: The cargo ship (292 GRT) was torpedoed and sunk off the west coast of Siam some 26 nautical miles east of Phuket in position (7°57′N 98°49′E) by HMS Strongbow (Royal Navy) with the loss of 5 lives.
U-394	Kriegsmarine	World War II: The Type VIIC submarine (1,070 GRT) was sunk in the Norwegian Sea south east of Jan Mayen, Norway (69°47′N 4°10′E) by a Fairey Swordfish aircraft of 825 Squadron, Fleet Air Arm, based on HMS Vindex and depth charges and gunfire from HMS Keppel, HMS Mermaid, HMS Peacock and HMS Whitehall (all Royal Navy) with the loss of all 50 hands.
Weilburg	Germany	World War II: The cargo ship struck a mine and sank in the Bay of Kiel.

== 3 September ==
List of shipwrecks: 3 September 1944
Ship	State	Description
Livingston	United Kingdom	World War II: The cargo ship (2,140 GRT, 1928) was torpedoed and sunk in the Atlantic Ocean north east of Louisburg, Nova Scotia, Canada (46°15′N 58°05′W) by U-541 (Kriegsmarine) with the loss of 14 of her 28 crew. Survivors were rescued by HMCS Barrie (Royal Canadian Navy).
Sperrbrecher 155	Kriegsmarine	World War II: The Sperrbrecher was scuttled at Antwerp, Belgium. She was raised on 30 May 1945 and completed as the cargo ship Ardea.

== 4 September ==
List of shipwrecks: 4 September 1944
Ship	State	Description
Ambra	Regia Marina	World War II: The Perla-class submarine was sunk during Allied air raid on Genoa.
Bosworth	United Kingdom	World War II: The cargo ship was scuttled as a blockship off the coast of Calvados, France. She was refloated in May 1949 and scrapped.
Erlangen	Germany	World War II: The hospital ship was sunk in an Allied air raid on Genoa, Italy.
Grenadier	Germany	World War II: The incomplete cargo ship was scuttled in the Scheldt by German forces. She was raised on 19 February 1945 and completed in 1946 as Armand Grisar.
Gypsum	United States	The 366-foot (112 m) Design B7-D1 concrete-hulled barge was scuttled at Guam (13°46′N 144°00′E) as part of the Glass Breakwater.
Hinode Maru No. 6	Imperial Japanese Navy	World War II: The guard ship (245 GRT) was shelled, torpedoed and sunk in the Pacific Ocean (31°55′N 152°00′E) by Bowfin (United States Navy) with the loss of 3 lives. Bowfin captured two survivors and saw a dozen others in the water.
I-O-27	Kriegsmarine	The Siebelgefäß landing craft was sunk on this date.
I-O-44	Kriegsmarine	The Siebelgefäß landing craft was sunk on this date.
Musketier	Germany	World War II: The uncompleted tanker was scuttled in the Scheldt at Antwerp. She was raised on 13 April 1945 and completed in 1946 as Gouvernor Galpin.
S 184	Kriegsmarine	World War II: The torpedo boat was shelled and sunk in the English Channel by British shore-based artillery.
TA28	Kriegsmarine	World War II: The Ariete-class torpedo boat was destroyed in drydock at Genoa during and Allied air raid.
TA33	Kriegsmarine	World War II: The incomplete Soldati-class destroyer was sunk during trials off Genoa by American aircraft with the loss of 14 lives.
UIT-15	Kriegsmarine	World War II: The ex-Italian Flutto-class submarine was bombed and sunk at Genoa by aircraft of the Royal Air Force.
UIT-16	Kriegsmarine	World War II: The ex-Italian Flutto-class submarine was bombed and sunk at Genoa by aircraft of the Royal Air Force.
UIT-20	Kriegsmarine	World War II: The ex-Italian Flutto-class submarine was bombed and sunk at Genoa, Italy by aircraft of the Royal Air Force.
Unnamed	Belgium	World War II: The uncompleted tanker was scuttled at Hoboken, Antwerp by German forces. She was raised on 6 December 1945 and completed in 1949 as Belgian Pride.
Unnamed	Belgium	World War II: The incomplete tanker was scuttled at Hoboken by German forces. She was raised on 27 December 1944 and completed in April 1946 as Stavelot.
Unnamed	Belgium	World War II: The incomplete cargo ship was scuttled at Hoboken by German forces. She was raised on 12 November 1944 and completed in 1946 as Houffalize.

== 5 September ==
List of shipwrecks: 5 September 1944
Ship	State	Description
Ioannis Fafalios	Greece	World War II: The collier (5,670 GRT, 1919), from Durban for Aden, was torpedoed and sunk in the Indian Ocean 300 nautical miles (560 km) north east of Mombasa, Kenya (4°20′S 43°57′E) by U-861 (Kriegsmarine) with the loss of eight of her 33 crew.
Kokka Maru	Japan	World War II: Convoy TAMO-25: The Type 1K ore carrier ran aground leaving Keelung Harbour, Formosa. She was refloated later in the day and returned to port. Sunk by a mine in Keelung Harbour on 5, 7 or 12 September. (25°12′N 121°45′E).
M-274	Kriegsmarine	World War II: The minesweeper was scuttled in the Scheldt off Doel, Belgium.
M-276	Kriegsmarine	World War II: The minesweeper was scuttled in the Scheldt.
M 3631	Kriegsmarine	World War II: The minesweeper was scuttled in the Scheldt.
R 12	Kriegsmarine	World War II: The minesweeper struck a mine and sank in the northern Adriatic Sea off Umag. There were 10 dead and 4 wounded.
RA 261	Kriegsmarine	The RA 251-class minesweeper was sunk on this date.
RA 262	Kriegsmarine	The RA 251-class minesweeper was sunk on this date.
S-184	Kriegsmarine	World War II: The Type 1939/40 motor torpedo boat was sunk in the English Channel by British shore batteries.
Shingetsu Maru	Japan	World War II: The coaster (880 GRT) was torpedoed and sunk in the Pacific Ocean north of Muroto Saki, Shikoku (32°24′N 134°15′E) by USS Albacore (United States Navy) with the loss of 22 crew.
Shiretoko Maru	Japan	World War II: The cargo ship was torpedoed and sunk at Batavia, Netherlands East Indies by HMS Tantivy (Royal Navy).
Shonan Maru	Japan	World War II: Convoy MOTA-22: The Shonan Maru-class ore carrier was torpedoed and sunk in the Pacific Ocean south west of Kyushu (30°55′N 129°45′E) by USS Seal (United States Navy). Five crewmen were killed.
U-362	Kriegsmarine	World War II: The Type VIIC submarine was depth charged and sunk in the Kara Sea off Krakovka, Soviet Union (75°51′N 89°27′E) by T-116 (Soviet Navy) with the loss of all 51 crew.
UJ 106	Kriegsmarine	World War II: The submarine chaser was scuttled in the Danube at Prahovo, Romania.
UJ 110	Kriegsmarine	World War II: The submarine chaser was scuttled in the Danube at Prahovo.
UJ 6083	Kriegsmarine	The Ape-class submarine chaser was sunk on this date.
UJ 6085	Kriegsmarine	World War II: The submarine chaser, a former Gabbiano-class corvette, was sunk at Genoa, Italy by Allied aircraft.

== 6 September ==
List of shipwrecks: 6 September 1944
Ship	State	Description
Breda	Germany	World War II: The cargo ship (1,260 GRT, 1915) was torpedoed and sunk in the North Sea off Emden, Lower Saxony by Bristol Beaufighter aircraft of 455 Squadron, Royal Australian Air Force and 489 Squadron, Royal New Zealand Air Force with the loss of 12 lives.
Eguchi Maru No. 3	Imperial Japanese Navy	World War II: The auxiliary minesweeper (198 GRT) was torpedoed and sunk in the Pacific Ocean at entrance to Kii Suido, Japan (33°29′N 135°32′E), by USS Albacore (United States Navy).
Eiji Maru	Japan	World War II: Convoy TAMA-25: The cargo ship was sunk by a mine off the south west coast of Formosa.(22°19′N 120°30′E). A total of 611 troops and six crewmen were killed.
Norderney II	Germany	World War II: The lightship was torpedoed and sunk in the North Sea off Emden by Bristol Beaufighter aircraft of 455 Squadron Royal Australian Air Force and 478 Squadron Royal New Zealand Air Force.
R 304	Kriegsmarine	World War II: The R 301-class minesweeper struck a mine and sank off Ekkerøy, Norway. 23 of her 28 crew were killed.
Rosafred	Sweden	World War II: The cargo ship was torpedoed and sunk in the North Sea off Roter Sand, Germany by Bristol Beaufighter aircraft, almost certainly of 455 Squadron, Royal Australian Air Force and 489 Squadron, Royal New Zealand Air Force.
Sperrbrecher 185 Hans Burg	Kriegsmarine	World War II: The Sperrbrecher was severely damaged in a British air raid on Emden. She was taken to Wilhelmshaven for repairs. She was further damaged there in Allied air raids on 30 March and 12 April 1945, being burnt out on the latter date. Subsequently repaired post-war and entered Bundesmarine service as Heidberg.

== 7 September ==
List of shipwrecks: 7 September 1944
Ship	State	Description
A R B 8	United States	The 26-gross register ton, 49.1-foot (15.0 m) fishing vessel was destroyed by fire at the mouth of the Dangerous River (59°20′55″N 139°18′00″W) on the south-central coast of the Territory of Alaska.
Eiyo Maru No. 2	Imperial Japanese Navy	World War II: Convoy C-076: The oiler was torpedoed and damaged in the Sulu Sea off Mindanao, Philippines by USS Paddle (United States Navy). Towed to Sindugon Point, Cebu (08°10′N 122°40′E) and beached on 9 September, declared damaged beyond repair. Bombed and sunk 12 September. Two passengers and 43 crew were killed.
F 332	Kriegsmarine	The Type A Marinefahrprahm was sunk on this date.
F 337	Kriegsmarine	The Type A Marinefahrprahm Sperrbrecher was sunk on this date.
F 339	Kriegsmarine	The Type A Marinefahrprahm was sunk on this date.
F 342	Kriegsmarine	The Type A Marinefahrprahm was sunk on this date.
F 359	Kriegsmarine	The Type A Marinefahrprahm was sunk on this date.
F 534	Kriegsmarine	The Type C Marinefahrprahm was sunk on this date.
John C. Calhoun	United States	The Liberty ship was damaged at Finschhafen, New Guinea by the explosion of her cargo. She was declared a constructive total loss.
Kehl	Kriegsmarine	The auxiliary river minesweeper was sunk on this date.
MAL 27	Kriegsmarine	World War II: The incomplete MAL 1A type landing fire support lighter was sunk at Krupp Shipyard, Rheinhausen.
MAL 30	Kriegsmarine	World War II: The incomplete MAL 1A type landing fire support lighter was sunk at Krupp Shipyard, Rheinhausen.
Mainz	Kriegsmarine	The auxiliary river minesweeper was sunk on this date.
Mosel	Kriegsmarine	The auxiliary river minesweeper was sunk on this date.
PiLB 512	Kriegsmarine	The PiLB 41 type landing craft was lost on this date.
Shinyō Maru	Japan	World War II: Convoy C-076: The cargo ship was torpedoed and sunk in the Sulu Sea off Mindanao by USS Paddle (United States Navy) while carrying 1 British and 749 US prisoners of war (POWs). A total of 667 American POWs, 47 guards and 15 crew were killed. 83 POW survivors make it to shore where one died, the rest were helped by Filipino guerillas. 31 were picked up by USS Narwhal (United States Navy) on 29 September.
SM 243	Kriegsmarine	The Type A Marinefahrprahm was sunk on this date.
Ulm	Kriegsmarine	The auxiliary river minesweeper was sunk on this date.
Westfalen	Kriegsmarine	World War II: The seaplane tender was sunk by mines in the Skagerrak off Marstrand, Västra Götaland County, Sweden. Aboard were 200 German soldiers and 75–80 German and Norwegian prisoners. There were 65 or 78 survivors, and around 200 dead.

== 8 September ==
List of shipwrecks: 8 September 1944
Ship	State	Description
Elbe	Germany	World War II: The fishing trawler struck a mine and sank.
Empire Heritage	United Kingdom	World War II: Convoy HX 305: The tanker (15,702 GRT, 1930) was torpedoed and sunk in the Atlantic Ocean north north east of Tory Island, County Donegal, Ireland (55°27′N 8°01′W) by U-482 (Kriegsmarine) with the loss of 112 of the 163 people on board. Survivors were rescued by HMT Northern Wave (Royal Navy) and Pinto (United Kingdom).
Flint	United States	The 366-foot (112 m) Design B7-D1 concrete-hulled barge was scuttled at Guam (13°46′N 144°00′E) as part of the Glass Breakwater.
Kong Alf	Norway	The coaster (687 GRT, 1921) foundered in the Baltic Sea (57°11′30″N 12°04′36″E). All crew were rescued by Fritiof (Sweden). Later raised, repaired and returned to service.
Nichian Maru	Japan	World War II: Convoy TAKA-808: The cargo ship was torpedoed and sunk in the East China Sea west north west of Ishigaki Island (24°45′N 123°20′E) by USS Spadefish (United States Navy). 51 crewmen killed.
Nichiman Maru	Japan	World War II: Convoy TAKA-808: The cargo ship was torpedoed and sunk in the East China Sea west north west of Ishigaki Island (24°45′N 123°20′E) by USS Spadefish (United States Navy). 53 crewmen were killed.
Pinto	United Kingdom	World War II: Convoy HX 305: The rescue ship (1,346 GRT, 1928) was torpedoed and sunk in the Atlantic Ocean north north east of Tory Island (55°27′N 8°01′W) by U-482 (Kriegsmarine) with the loss of 18 of the 59 people aboard, including two survivors from Empire Heritage (United Kingdom). Survivors were rescued by HMT Northern Wave (Royal Navy).
R-235	Kriegsmarine	World War II: The Type R-218 minesweeper was scuttled or sunk in a collision in the Merwe Canal.
Rex	Italy	Rex World War II: The ocean liner was bombed and sunk at Koper, Yugoslavia, by Bristol Beaufighter aircraft of the Royal Air Force. The wreck was raised and scrapped in situ in August 1947.
Ryuka Maru	Japan	World War II: Convoy C-076: The transport was torpedoed and sunk in the Sulu Sea off Mindanao, Philippines (08°19′N 121°30′E) by USS Bashaw (United States Navy). 328 troops, two gunners and 16 crewmen were killed.
Shinten Maru	Imperial Japanese Army	World War II: Convoy TAKA-808: The Shinten Maru-class auxiliary transport was torpedoed and sunk in the East China Sea west north west of Ishigaki Island (24°45′N 123°20′E) by USS Spadefish (United States Navy). Two gunners and eight crewmen were killed.
Shokei Maru	Imperial Japanese Navy	World War II: Convoy TAKA-808: The Shokei Maru-class auxiliary transport was torpedoed and sunk in the East China Sea west north west of Ishigaki Island (24°45′N 123°20′E) by USS Spadefish (United States Navy). Two crewmen were killed.
StuBo 1038	Kriegsmarine	The StuBo42 type landing craft/motor launch was sunk on this date.
StuBo 1039	Kriegsmarine	The StuBo42 type landing craft/motor launch was sunk on this date.
T-353	Soviet Navy	World War II: The minesweeper struck a mine and sank in Narva Bay.
UJ 2224	Kriegsmarine	The Ape-class submarine chaser was sunk on this date.
Yanagigawa Maru	Japan	World War II: The transport ship was torpedoed and sunk in the Sulu Sea west of Mindanao by USS Bashaw (United States Navy).
Zagreb	Kriegsmarine	World War II: The auxiliary river minesweeper was wrecked when her Croat crewmembers mutinied and ran her ashore and looted the vessel.

== 9 September ==
List of shipwrecks: 9 September 1944
Ship	State	Description
Bukun Maru	Japan	World War II: The tanker struck a mine and sank in the Strait of Malacca.
CHa-8 and CHa-9	Imperial Japanese Navy	World War II: The CHa-1-class submarine chasers were sunk off Sumatra, Netherlands East Indies by mines.
Erna Oldendorff	Germany	World War II: The cargo ship was bombed and sunk off Saint-Nazaire, Loire-Inférieure, France by Allied aircraft. The wreck was dispersed by explosives on 14 April 1949.
F 623	Kriegsmarine	The Type C2 Marinefahrprahm was sunk on this date.
FR 118	Kriegsmarine	World War II: The Redoutable-class submarine was bombed and sunk at Genoa, Italy.
Hindoo	Panama	The cargo ship, one of the seized Danish ships, Broholm, operated under Panamanian flag for the War Shipping Administration, on passage from Guantanamo to Barranquilla under escort by PC-616, collided with Australia Star (United Kingdom) and sank. 31 survivors were rescued. The collision set case law as PC-616 was found liable for not supervising movement of the escorted vessel and warning Hindoo of collision.
KT-337	Soviet Navy	The KM-4-class river minesweeping launch was sunk on this date.
Kuniyama Maru	Japan	World War II: The cargo ship was sunk in the Sulu Sea by United States Navy aircraft.
Kurenai Maru	Japan	World War II: The cargo ship was sunk in the Sulu Sea by United States Navy aircraft.
Lerøy	Norway	The cutter (26 GRT, 1904) collided with Saude (Norway) off Klokkarvik, Norway and sank. All seven people on board survived.
M 5631	Kriegsmarine	World War II: The KFK-2-class naval drifter/minesweeper struck a mine and sank in Romsdalsfjord.
Manshu Maru	Japan	World War II: Convoy TAMA-25: The cargo ship was torpedoed and sunk 43 nautical miles (80 km) north west of Calayan Island, Philippines (19°45′N 120°55′E) by USS Queenfish (United States Navy). 900 troops and crewmen were killed.
Mihaya Maru	Japan	World War II: The cargo ship was sunk in the Sulu Sea by United States Navy aircraft.
R-304	Kriegsmarine	World War II: The Type R-301 minesweeper was sunk by mine off Eggeroy.
Rozan Maru	Japan	World War II: The cargo ship (6,638 GRT) was bombed and sunk by United States Navy aircraft.
Saiwai Maru No. 8	Japan	World War II: The cargo ship was bombed and severely damaged in an American air raid on Okinawa. She was declared a total loss.
Sava	(Independent State of Croatia) Croatian Navy	World War II: The river monitor was scuttled by her crew near Slavonski Brod. Raised and repaired post war and returned to Yugoslavian service.
Shonan Maru	Imperial Japanese Army	World War II: The Daifuku Maru No. 1-class transport was torpedoed and sunk in the Sea of Okhotsk north of Etorofu, Kurile Islands (47°03′N 148°18′E) by USS Seal (United States Navy). Her crew were rescued by USS Seal.
Shoryu Maru	Japan	World War II: Convoy 3908: The cargo ship was torpedoed and sunk by USS Bang (United States Navy) off Tateyama (28°58′N 137°45′E). 64 troops and four crewmen were killed.
Taiyu Maru	Japan	World War II: The cargo ship was sunk in the Sulu Sea by United States Navy aircraft.
TK-224	Soviet Navy	The A-1 (Vosper 72-foot)-class motor torpedo boat was lost on this date.
Tokiwasan Maru	Japan	World War II: Convoy 3908: The cargo ship was torpedoed and sunk by USS Bang (United States Navy) off Tateyama (28°58′N 137°45′E). 14 troops and nine crew were killed.
Toyooka Maru	Japan	World War II: Convoy TAMA-25: The cargo ship was torpedoed and sunk 43 nautical miles (80 km) north west of Calayan Island (19°45′N 120°55′E) by USS Queenfish (United States Navy). A total of 1,036 troops and nine crewmen were killed.
Tsinan Maru	Japan	World War II: The cargo ship struck a mine and sank off Woosung, China.
U-484	Kriegsmarine	World War II: The Type VIIC submarine was depth charged and sunk in the Atlantic Ocean north west of Ireland (55°45′N 11°41′W) by HMS Helmsdale and HMS Portchester Castle (both Royal Navy) with the loss of all 52 crew.
UJ 2142	Kriegsmarine	World War II: The submarine chaser was bombed and sunk in the Mediterranean Sea north of Crete by Allied aircraft.
V 1303 Freiburg	Kriegsmarine	The Vorpostenboot was lost on this date.

== 10 September ==
List of shipwrecks: 10 September 1944
Ship	State	Description
AF 43	Kriegsmarine	World War II: The Artilleriefährprahm was sunk in an Allied air raid on Hoedekenskerke, Zeeland, Netherlands. Four crew were killed.
AF 48	Kriegsmarine	World War II: The Artilleriefährprahm was sunk in an Allied air raid on Hoedekenskerke, Zeeland, Netherlands.
Bukun Maru	Imperial Japanese Army	World War II: The tanker struck a mine and sank in the Straits of Malacca (3°54′N 98°42′E). Her cargo of aviation gasoline burned on the water, destroying the lifeboats and killing all 44 crew and 29 passengers as well as a fishing boat and her crew.
Chihaya Maru	Imperial Japanese Navy	World War II: Convoy MI-19: The auxiliary tanker was torpedoed and sunk in the Tsushima Strait east of Quelpart Island (33°39′N 127°43′E) by USS Sunfish (United States Navy). 76 troops, one gunner, and eight crewmen were killed. 6 Daihatsu landing craft go down with the ship.
F 185	Kriegsmarine	The Type A Marinefahrprahm was sunk in an Allied air raid on Hoedekenskerke, Zeeland, Netherlands.
F 186	Kriegsmarine	The Type A Marinefahrprahm was sunk in an Allied air raid on Hoedekenskerke, Zeeland, Netherlands.
Hinoki Maru	Imperial Japanese Navy	World War II: The Hinoki Maru-class auxiliary netlayer was torpedoed in the Java Sea by USS Pargo (United States Navy). The vessel sank the next day 75 nautical miles (139 km; 86 mi) east north east of Kangean Island, Netherlands East Indies (06°17′S 116°27′E).
Hoei Maru No. 2	Kriegsmarine	World War II: The cargo ship struck a mine and sank off Woosung.
Korei Maru	Japan	World War II: The coaster was torpedoed and sunk in the Indian Ocean west of Sumatra, Netherlands East Indies by HNLMS O 19 (Royal Netherlands Navy).
M-96	Soviet Navy	World War II: The M-class submarine (200 GRT) was sunk by a mine in Narva Bay with the loss of all 22 hands.
Misago Maru	Imperial Japanese Navy	World War II: Convoy MR 1: The submarine chaser was attacked and sunk in the Indian Ocean by Hawker Hurricane and Bristol Beaufighter aircraft of the Royal Air Force.
PK-234	Soviet Navy	The MO-4-class submarine chaser was sunk on this date.
U-20	Kriegsmarine	World War II: The Type IIB submarine was scuttled in the Black Sea (41°10′N 30°47′E).
U-23	Kriegsmarine	World War II: The Type IIB submarine was scuttled in the Black Sea (41°11′N 30°00′E).

== 11 September ==
List of shipwrecks: 11 September 1944
Ship	State	Description
CHa-165	Imperial Japanese Navy	World War II: The CHa-1-class submarine chaser was sunk off Kagashima (32°20′N 131°50′E) by USS Albacore (United States Navy).
Eurofeld	Kriegsmarine	World War II: The replenishment oiler was scuttled at Saint-Nazaire, France. Wreck raised and scrapped in 1950.
F 190	Kriegsmarine	World War II: The Type AM Marinefahrprahm minelayer (175 GRT) was sunk by a mine off Lister, Norway (58°04′N 6°41′E). The crew was saved.
FC 45 Fortis	Kriegsmarine	The naval trawler was lost on this date.
Giulio Cesare	Regia Marina	World War II: The hospital ship was bombed and sunk at Vallone di Zaule by Bristol Beaufighter aircraft of 16 Squadron, South African Air Force. She was refloated in 1948 and scrapped in 1949.
Hakuun Maru No. 2	Japan	World War II: Convoy 4901A : The coaster (860 GRT) was torpedoed and sunk in the Pacific Ocean west of Chichijima (27°05′N 140°00′E) by USS Finback (United States Navy). Four crew were killed.
Hassho Maru	Imperial Japanese Army	World War II: Convoy 1910B : The Hassho Maru-class auxiliary transport ship (530 GRT) was attacked west of Chichijima by American Consolidated B-24 Liberator aircraft and damaged by near misses. She was scuttled by shelling by Oki and Chidori (both Imperial Japanese Navy) (26°57′N 140°06′E). One crew was killed.
Horai Maru No. 1	Japan	World War II: The cargo ship was sunk at Palau by United States Navy aircraft.
HMS LCM 263	Royal Navy	The landing craft mechanized (21/35 t, 1942) was lost on this date.
M-462	Kriegsmarine	World War II: The minesweeper was bombed and sunk north east of Skagen, Denmark by Allied aircraft.
R-80	Kriegsmarine	World War II: The Type R-41 minesweeper was sunk by British aircraft off Hoofdplaat, Zeeland, Netherlands.
U-19	Kriegsmarine	World War II: The Type IIB submarine was scuttled in the Black Sea (41°34′N 31°50′E).
Vang	Norway	World War II: The coaster was torpedoed and sunk in the North Sea off Lista, Norway (58°03′N 6°34′E) by HMS Venturer (Royal Navy). All crew survived.

== 12 September ==
List of shipwrecks: 12 September 1944
Ship	State	Description
Ayazono Maru	Japan	World War II: Convoy C-067: The tanker was sunk by United States Navy carrier-based aircraft northwest of Cebu, Philippines (10°20′N 124°0′E). 37 crewmen were killed.
Bali	Germany	World War II: The cargo ship was scuttled as a blockship at Dordrecht, South Holland, Netherlands. She was refloated in 1945, repaired and returned to service in 1947.
Eiyo Maru No. 2	Imperial Japanese Navy	World War II: The auxiliary oiler was sunk by United States Navy carrier-based aircraft near Cebu, Philippines. 43 crewmen and two passengers were killed.
F 184	Kriegsmarine	World War II: The Type A Marinefahrprahm (155 GRT) was sunk by Allied fighter-bomber aircraft at Terneuzen, Netherlands.
F 249	Kriegsmarine	The Type A Marinefahrprahm was sunk on this date.
F 616	Kriegsmarine	The Type C2 Marinefahrprahm was sunk on this date.
F 863	Kriegsmarine	The Type D Marinefahrprahm was sunk on this date.
Genkai Maru	Imperial Japanese Army	World War II: Convoy M-103: The Genkai Maru-class auxiliary transport (3,851 GRT) was sunk by United States Navy carrier-based aircraft near Cebu, Philippines. Depending on the source, 50 or 76 crewmen were killed.
George Ade	United States	The Liberty ship was torpedoed and damaged in the Atlantic Ocean off the coast of Delaware by U-518 (Kriegsmarine). George Ade was on a voyage from Mobile, Alabama to the United Kingdom. She was towed in to Chesapeake Bay. Subsequently repaired and returned to service.
Gyoraitei 52, Gyoraitei 62 and Gyoraitei 67	Imperial Japanese Navy	World War II: The motor torpedo boats were sunk by United States Navy carrier-based aircraft near Cebu, Philippines.
Honor	Germany	World War II: The cargo ship was scuttled at Sanremo, Italy. She was refloated in 1947 and scrapped.
HR 82	Kriegsmarine	The naval drifter was lost on this date.
Hakutetsu Maru No. 7	Imperial Japanese Navy	World War II: The collier, a Hakutetsu Maru No. 7-class auxiliary transport ship, was torpedoed and sunk in the Pacific Ocean 2.7 miles (4.3 km) east of Kashinozaki, Japan (33°32′N 135°55′E) by USS Pipefish (United States Navy). Four crewmen and six passengers were killed.
Hirado	Imperial Japanese Navy	World War II: Convoy HI-72: The Etorofu-class escort ship was torpedoed and sunk in the South China Sea southeast of Hong Kong (17°54′N 114°49′E) by USS Growler (United States Navy). 107 crewmen, including the captain and Rear Admiral Kajioka were killed. The admiral's staff, 26 others and 74 crewmen were rescued.
Kachidoki Maru	Japan	World War II: Convoy HI-72: The transport was torpedoed and sunk in the South China Sea southeast of Hong Kong (19°25′N 112°23′E) by USS Pampanito (United States Navy). The ship was carrying Australian and British prisoners of war (POWs); 431 POWs, 145 troops and 12 crewmen were killed. 521 POWs were rescued by the escort ships. 159 survivors were rescued by USS Sealion, USS Queenfish, and USS Pampanito (all United States Navy) on 15 September, with 7 dying before they could be landed at Tanapag Harbor, Saipan, Mariana Islands.
Keian Maru	Japan	World War II: Convoy C-067: The cargo ship was sunk by United States Navy carrier-based aircraft (United States Navy) near Cebu, Philippines. 80 soldiers and 24 crewmen were killed.
Kiso Maru	Imperial Japanese Navy	World War II: The Fuji Maru-class auxiliary gunboat was sunk by United States Navy carrier-based aircraft at 11°18′N 124°04′E near BulalaQui Point, Cebu, Philippines. Four crewmen were killed.
Korei Maru	Imperial Japanese Navy	World War II: The Shinto Maru No. 2-class auxiliary netlayer (540 GRT 1939) was bombed and sunk by Task Force 38 aircraft at Cebu, Philippines. 22 crew were killed.
M 426	Kriegsmarine	World War II: The minesweeper was bombed and sunk off Kristiansand, Norway by Bristol Beaufighter aircraft of the Royal Air Force with the loss of 22 lives.
Nankai Maru	Imperial Japanese Navy	World War II: Convoy HI-72: The Nankai Maru-class auxiliary transport was torpedoed and sunk in the South China Sea 280 nautical miles (520 km) south of Hong Kong (18°15′N 114°21′E) by USS Sealion (United States Navy). 196 troops and three crewmen were killed.
Nichiei Maru	Imperial Japanese Navy	World War II: The Shokei Maru-class auxiliary transport (2,446 GRT 1939) was bombed and sunk in the Camotes Sea off Mactan Island, Philippines (10°20′N 124°00′E) by US Navy aircraft. One crewman was killed.
USS Noa	United States Navy	The high-speed transport, a former Clemson-class destroyer, was rammed in the Pacific Ocean off Palau by USS Fullam (United States Navy) and sank. All 150 crew were rescued by USS Fullam.
Ostland	Germany	World War II: The cargo ship was damaged off Stad, Norway by aircraft based on HMS Furious and HMS Trumpeter (both Royal Navy). She was beached.
PC-75	Yugoslav Partisans	World War II: The patrol boat was bombed and sunk by six Hawker Hurricane aircraft.
R 178	Kriegsmarine	World War II: the minesweeper was scuttled at Thessaloniki, Greece.
Rakuto Maru	Imperial Japanese Navy	World War II: Convoy C-067: The Sinkyo Maru-class auxiliary transport was sunk by aerial bombing in the Camotes Sea off Mactan Island, near Pangian Cape's south coast, Cebu (10°20′N 124°20′E) by United States Navy carrier-based aircraft. 170 troops and 29 crewmen were killed.
Rakuyo Maru	Japan	World War II: Convoy HI-72: The troopship was torpedoed and sunk in the South China Sea 280 nautical miles (520 km) south of Hong Kong by USS Sealion (United States Navy). The ship was carrying Australian and British prisoners of war (POWs); 1,159 of the 1,318 POWs were killed in the sinking, 54 survivors were rescued by USS Sealion, USS Queenfish, and USS Pampanito (all United States Navy) on 15 September, with four dying before they could be landed at Tanapag Harbor, Saipan, Mariana Islands. Nine crewmen were killed.
SF 306	Kriegsmarine	The Siebelfahre Type 43 was sunk on this date.
Schnelles Geleitboot 19	Kriegsmarine	World War II: The escort ship was bombed and sunk by aircraft at the mouth of the Ebro.
Shikinami	Imperial Japanese Navy	World War II: Convoy HI-72: The Fubuki-class destroyer was torpedoed and sunk in the South China Sea 280 nautical miles (520 km) south of Hong Kong (18°16′N 114°40′E) by USS Growler (United States Navy) with the loss of 91 of her 219 crew. 128 survivors were rescued by Mikura (Imperial Japanese Navy).
T-61	Kriegsmarine	World War II: The unfinished Type 1940 torpedo boat was being towed to Germany when she was torpedoed by Allied aircraft and beached at Den Helder. Scrapped post war.
Toyo Maru	Japan	World War II: Convoy C-067: The cargo ship was sunk by United States Navy carrier-based aircraft near Cebu, Philippines. Five crewmen were killed.
V 5105 Wirbel	Kriegsmarine	World War II: The Vorpostenboot was damaged off Stad by aircraft based on HMS Furious and HMS Trumpeter (both Royal Navy). She was beached.
V 5307 Felix Scheder	Kriegsmarine	World War II: The Steiermark-class Vorpostenboot was bombed and sunk off Stad by aircraft based on HMS Furious and HMS Trumpeter (both Royal Navy) with the loss of 22 lives.
V 5309 Seerobbe	Kriegsmarine	World War II: The Vorpostenboot was sunk off Stad by aircraft based on HMS Furious and HMS Trumpeter (both Royal Navy).
USS YMS-409	United States Navy	1944 Great Atlantic hurricane: The YMS-1-class minesweeper foundered off the east coast of the United States with the loss of all 33 hands.
Zuiho Maru	Japan	World War II: Convoy HI-72: The transport was torpedoed and sunk in the South China Sea 280 nautical miles (520 km) south of Hong Kong (19°23′N 111°50′E) by USS Pampanito (United States Navy).

== 13 September ==
List of shipwrecks: 13 September 1944
Ship	State	Description
CH-55	Imperial Japanese Navy	World War II: The No.28-class submarine chaser was bombed and sunk 3 nautical miles (5.6 km) north of Cebu, Philippines (10°20′N 124°00′E) by United States Navy aircraft.
USS Concrete No. 31	United States Navy	The 366-foot (112 m) B7-A1-class concrete-hulled oil barge was scuttled at Guam (13°46′N 144°00′E) as part of the Glass Breakwater.
Democratia	Greece	World War II: The Greek Partizan gunboat was sunk by German ships in the harbor at Ithaca Island.
Empire Archer	United Kingdom	The cargo ship was driven ashore on Rathlin Island, County Donegal, Ireland. She was on a voyage from Sunderland, County Durham to an American port. She was later refloated and beached at Bangor, County Down. Subsequently repaired at Glasgow, Renfrewshire and returned to service.
Etashima Maru	Japan	World War II: The cargo ship was torpedoed and damaged just before midnight in the Yellow Sea (34°31′N 124°46′E) by USS Sunfish (United States Navy). She broke in half with the forward part sinking an hour later on 13 September. 369 passengers and 7 crew were killed. Her aft section drifts until sinking on 30 September off the Yangtze River mouth.
M 5603 Albatros	Kriegsmarine	World War II: The minesweeper was sunk in a Soviet air raid on Kiberg, Norway. Three of her 19 crew were killed.
HMS MFV 1032	Royal Navy	The MFV 1001-class motor fishing boat (93/114 t, 1944) sank in the western Mediterranean Sea while in tow.
Maria Antonietta	Germany	World War II: The tugboat was sunk by German ships in the harbor at Ithaca Island after being captured earlier in the day by Greek Partizans.
USS Perry	United States Navy	World War II: The high-speed minesweeper, a former Clemson-class destroyer, struck a mine and sank in the Pacific Ocean off Angaur, Palau. All 133 crew were rescued by USS Preble (United States Navy).
SS-14	Imperial Japanese Navy	World War II: The SS-class landing ship was sunk by United States aircraft near Cebu.
Toni	Germany	World War II: The cargo ship was shelled and sunk off Santorini, Greece, by HMS Troubridge and HMS Tuscan (both Royal Navy).
USS Warrington	United States Navy	1944 Great Atlantic hurricane: The Somers-class destroyer foundered in the Atlantic Ocean 450 nautical miles (830 km) off Vero Beach, Florida with the loss of 248 of her 321 crew.

== 14 September ==
List of shipwrecks: 14 September 1944
Ship	State	Description
USCGC Bedloe	United States Coast Guard	World War II: The Active-class patrol boat foundered off Cape Hatteras, North Carolina during the 1944 Great Atlantic hurricane with the loss of 26 lives while on a mission to assist the crew of George Ade, which had been torpedoed by U-518 (Kriegsmarine). There were 12 survivors.
Borgheim	Kriegsmarine	World War II: The cutter was sunk in a Soviet air raid on Ekkerøy, Norway. Two of her six crew were killed.
F 168	Kriegsmarine	World War II: The Type A Marinefahrprahm (155 GRT) was scuttled by her crew near Milutinuvac on the Danube.
F 223	Kriegsmarine	World War II: The Marinefährprahm was sunk in a Soviet air raid on Vardø, Norway.
F 406	Kriegsmarine	World War II: The Type C Marinefahrprahm was sunk on this date. Salvaged and put in Soviet service as BDB-2 (Soviet Navy).
F 561	Kriegsmarine	The Type C2 Marinefahrprahm was sunk on this date.
F 563	Kriegsmarine	The Type C2 Marinefahrprahm was sunk on this date.
F 579	Kriegsmarine	The Type C2 Marinefahrprahm was sunk on this date.
F 583	Kriegsmarine	The Type C2 Marinefahrprahm was sunk on this date.
F 586	Kriegsmarine	The Type C2 Marinefahrprahm was sunk on this date.
Irene Oldendorff	Germany	World War II: The uncompleted cargo ship was sunk at Copenhagen, Denmark by saboteurs. She was later repaired, completed and entered service.
USCGC Jackson	United States Coast Guard	World War II: The Active-class patrol boat foundered off Cape Hatteras, North Carolina during the 1944 Great Atlantic hurricane with the loss of 21 lives while on a mission to assist the crew of George Ade, which had been torpedoed by the U-518 (Kriegsmarine). There were 20 survivors.
HMS MMS 278	Royal Navy	The MMS-class minesweeper (255/295 t, 1943) was wrecked off Saint-Malo, Ille-et-Vilaine, France.
USS Natchez	United States Navy	1944 Great Atlantic hurricane: The River-class frigate was driven ashore on the coast of Virginia. Later refloated and returned to service.
Schnelles Geleitboot 19	Kriegsmarine	World War II: The escort ship was sunk in the Mediterranean Sea off "Ebromündung" by Allied aircraft.
T-2	Imperial Japanese Navy	World War II: The No.1-class landing ship was bombed and damaged off Chichi Jima (27°07′N 142°12′E) by aircraft from USS Bunker Hill (United States Navy). Later in a storm she struck a reef and sank at 27°05′N 142°09′E.
T-3	Imperial Japanese Navy	World War II: The No.1-class landing ship ran aground in the Gulf of Davao near the entrance to Saragani Strait, off Pagobas, Mindanao (05°35′N 125°24′E). Her props, prop shaft and steering gear were damaged and she was beached. The next day she was torpedoed and sunk there by USS Guavina (United States Navy). There were 10 dead and 25 wounded.
T-5	Imperial Japanese Navy	World War II: The No.1-class landing ship was bombed and sunk in the Gulf of Davao off Davao, Philippines (06°10′N 126°00′E) by United States Navy aircraft. Only two of her 180 crew survived.
USS Temptress	United States Navy	1944 Great Atlantic hurricane: The Flower-class corvette was driven ashore on the coast of Virginia. Later refloated and returned to service.
Thomas Tracey	United States	1944 Great Atlantic Hurricane: The cargo ship was driven ashore at Rehoboth Beach, Delaware and broke in two. All 31 crew were rescued.
UJ 2216 L'Incomprise II	Kriegsmarine	World War II: The armed yacht/submarine chaser was sunk in the Mediterranean Sea off Sestri Levante, Liguria, Italy by USS PT-559 (United States Navy).
V 1608 Hamburg	Kriegsmarine	World War II: The Max Kochen-class Vorpostenboot was sunk off Kristiansand, Norway by Bristol Beaufighter aircraft of 235 and 248 Squadrons, Royal Air Force and de Havilland Mosquito aircraft of 404 Squadron, Royal Canadian Air Force.
V 5105	Kriegsmarine	World War II: The Vorpostenboot was bombed and damaged in the Aramsund Channel by Fleet Air Arm aircraft based on HMS Furious and HMS Trumpeter (both Royal Navy). She was beached.
V 5307 Felix Scheder	Kriegsmarine	World War II: The Vorpostenboot was bombed and sunk in the Aramsund Channel by Fleet Air Arm aircraft based on HMS Furious and HMS Trumpeter (both Royal Navy).
V 5309 Seerobbe	Kriegsmarine	World War II: The Vorpostenboot was bombed and damaged in the Aramsund Channel by Fleet Air Arm aircraft based on HMS Furious and HMS Trumpeter (both Royal Navy). She was beached.
Vinyard Sound Lightship	United States Coast Guard	1944 Great Atlantic hurricane: The lightship foundered in Vineyard Sound with the loss of all 12 crew.
USS YAG-17	United States Navy	1944 Great Atlantic hurricane: The amphibious training hulk, a dismasted barquentine, was forced ashore in Lynnhaven Roads, Chesapeake Bay near Little Creek, Virginia (36°57′N 76°13′W) and suffered a broken back. Later refloated, towed to Norfolk and abandoned in 1946.
USS YMS-409	United States Navy	1944 Great Atlantic hurricane: The YMS-1-class minesweeper foundered in the Atlantic Ocean. All 33 crew were lost.

== 15 September ==
List of shipwrecks: 15 September 1944
Ship	State	Description
CHANT 4	United Kingdom	World War II: The CHANT was shelled and damaged in the Strait of Dover by German artillery. She was repaired and returned to service.
DB 50	Kriegsmarine	The light gun carrier was sunk on this date.
F 173	Kriegsmarine	World War II: Lapland War: Operation Tanne Ost: The Type A Marinefährprahm was sunk in the Baltic Sea off Gogland, Soviet Union.
F 175	Kriegsmarine	World War II: Lapland War: Operation Tanne Ost: The Type A Marinefährprahm was sunk in the Baltic Sea off Gogland.
F 177	Kriegsmarine	World War II: Lapland War: Operation Tanne Ost: The Type A Marinefährprahm was sunk in the Baltic Sea off Gogland.
F 822	Kriegsmarine	The Type D Marinefahrprahm was sunk on this date.
F 868	Kriegsmarine	The Type D Marinefahrprahm was sunk on this date.
I-O-102	Kriegsmarine	The Siebelgefäß landing craft was sunk on this date.
Kehrweider	Germany	World War II: Operation Paravane: The cargo ship was bombed and sunk in Altafjord by Avro Lancaster aircraft of 9 and 617 Squadrons, Royal Air Force.
Konstanz	Kriegsmarine	The auxiliary river minesweeper was sunk on this date.
Kuha 6	Finnish Navy	World War II: Lapland War: The minesweeper was mined and sunk off Kirkonmaa, Koktka. Seven crew were killed, one crewman was rescued.
KT 26 Erpel	Kriegsmarine	World War II: The minesweeper was sunk in the Mediterranean Sea off Cape Spatha by HMS Royalist and HMS Teazer (both Royal Navy).
LAT 15 Margarethe	Kriegsmarine	The light gun carrier was sunk on this date.
HMS LCF(L) 31	Royal Navy	The anti-aircraft support landing craft (370/510 t, 1943) was lost on this date.
HMS LCF(L) 35	Royal Navy	The anti-aircraft support landing craft was lost on this date.
HMS LCP(L) 348	Royal Navy	The landing craft personnel (large) (5.9/8.2 t, 1943) was lost on this date.
PC-73 Pionir	Yugoslav Navy (Partizans)	World War II: The small patrol boat was captured by S 152, S 154, and S 158 (all Kriegsmarine). Later sunk.
R 29	Kriegsmarine	World War II: Lapland War: Operation Tanne Ost: The R 25-class minesweeper was torpedoed and sunk at Gogland by Taisto 5 (Finnish Navy).
R 76	Kriegsmarine	World War II: Lapland War: Operation Tanne Ost: The minesweeper was damaged in the Baltic Sea and consequently beached on Gogland. She was later salvaged, repaired and returned to service.
TA14	Kriegsmarine	World War II: The Turbine-class destroyer was sunk in an American air raid on Salamis, Greece with the loss of six lives.
Tirpitz	Kriegsmarine	World War II: Operation Paravane: The Bismarck-class battleship was bombed and severely damaged in Altafjord by Avro Lancaster aircraft of 9 and 617 Squadrons, Royal Air Force.
TKA-13	Soviet Navy	World War II: The D-3-class motor torpedo boat was sunk in the Baltic Sea by Vorpostenboote of 61 Vorpostenflotille, Kriegsmarine, or sunk by German R boats in the Arctic Sea. Nine crewmen were taken as prisoners of war.
UJ-1224	Kriegsmarine	World War II: The KUJ-class submarine chaser was sunk in Kongsfjord (70°43′N 29°19′E) by Soviet aircraft. One crew was killed.
UJ 2107 Milos	Kriegsmarine	The armed yacht/submarine chaser was lost on this date.
UJ 2171	Kriegsmarine	World War II: The minesweeper (formerly KT 4 Heidelberg) was sunk in the Mediterranean Sea off Cape Spatha, Greece by HMS Royalist and HMS Teazer (both Royal Navy). 65 crewmen were killed.
VMV 10 and VMV 14	Merivoimat	World War II: Lapland War: Operation Tanne Ost: The patrol ships were shelled and sunk in Suurkyla Harbor, Suursaari by Kriegsmarine ships.

== 16 September ==
List of shipwrecks: 16 September 1944
Ship	State	Description
Daressalam	Kriegsmarine	World War II: The depot ship was bombed and set afire at Kiel in an Allied air raid. She was refloated in 1945 and converted to an accommodation ship.
F 801	Kriegsmarine	The Type DM Marinefahrprahm minelayer was sunk on this date.
GP 91	Kriegsmarine	The KFK 2-class naval drifter was sunk on this date.
Hedgehog	Germany	World War II: The cargo ship was bombed and sunk at Kiel, Germany. Later salvaged.
I-364	Imperial Japanese Navy	World War II: The Type D1 submarine was torpedoed and sunk in the Pacific Ocean 250 nautical miles (460 km) east of the Boso Peninsula (34°30′N 145°23′E) by USS Sea Devil (United States Navy).
Imaji Maru	Japan	World War II: The cargo ship struck a mine and sank in the Sunda Strait near Laban, Philippines.
M 3202 Gotland	Kriegsmarine	World War II: The minesweeper was sunk at Terneuzen, Zeeland, Netherlands by Allied aircraft. There was no casualty.
Ogura Maru No. 2	Imperial Japanese Navy	World War II: Convoy HI-74: The 1TL-class replenishment oiler (possibly named Kokura Maru No. 2) was damaged by the explosion of Tokushima Maru (Imperial Japanese Navy); then she was torpedoed and sunk in the Bashi Channel (21°42′N 121°41′E) by USS Redfish (United States Navy). Three guards, 23 passengers and 15 crewmen were killed.
RO 20 Wolsum	Kriegsmarine	World War II: The cargo ship was bombed, exploded, and sunk at Kirkenes, Norway (69°44′N 30°07′E) in a Soviet air raid.
S 145	Kriegsmarine	World War II: The motor torpedo boat was scuttled at Brest, Finistère, France.
Shinai Maru	Japan	World War II: The cargo ship was sunk in the South China Sea (4°07′S 122°44′E by United States Navy aircraft.
TA14	Kriegsmarine	World War II: The Turbine-class destroyer was sunk by US aircraft at Salamis, Greece.
Tokusima Maru	Imperial Japanese Army	World War II: Convoy HI-74: The Tokushima Maru-class auxiliary transport was torpedoed and sunk in the Bashi Channel (21°57′N 121°35′E) by USS Picuda (United States Navy). 44 gunners, 82 passengers and 52 crewmen were killed.

== 17 September ==
List of shipwrecks: 17 September 1944
Ship	State	Description
Azusa Maru	Imperial Japanese Navy	World War II: Convoy HI-74: The 1TL-class replenishment oiler was torpedoed and sunk in the South China Sea 220 nautical miles (410 km) southeast of Hong Kong (19°08′N 116°33′E) by USS Barb (United States Navy). She blew up and sank with all hands.
F 373	Kriegsmarine	The Type A Marinefahrprahm was sunk on this date.
F 962	Kriegsmarine	The Type D Marinefahrprahm was sunk on this date.
HHa 06 Johan Adriaan	Kriegsmarine	The naval drifter was lost on this date.
HHa 07 Odin	Kriegsmarine	The naval drifter was lost on this date.
PiLB 213	Kriegsmarine	The PiLB 40 type landing craft was lost on this date.
R-171	Kriegsmarine	The Type R-151 minesweeper was sunk by hitting a wreck in the North Sea.
T18	Kriegsmarine	World War II: The Type 37 torpedo boat (1,098 GRT) was bombed and sunk by Soviet Douglas A-20 Havoc aircraft off Paldiski, Estonia. 30 crewmen were killed. There were 98 survivors.
TA17	Kriegsmarine	World War II: The Palestro-class torpedo boat was severely damaged in an Allied air raid on Piraeus, Greece. She was not repaired.
Unyō	Imperial Japanese Navy	World War II: Convoy HI-74: The Taiyō-class escort carrier was torpedoed and sunk in the South China Sea 220 nautical miles (410 km) south east of Hong Kong (19°08′N 116°36′E) by USS Barb (United States Navy) with the loss of approximately 240 lives. A total of 761 people were rescued by Chiburi and CD-27 (both Imperial Japanese Navy).
V 1201 Juno	Kriegsmarine	World War II: The Vorpostenboot struck a mine in the North Sea west of Heligoland and was damaged. She was then sunk by an Allied de Havilland Mosquito aircraft.
V 1202 Friedrich Suthmeyer	Kriegsmarine	World War II: The Vorpostenboot struck a mine in the North Sea west of Heligoland. She was then sunk by an Allied de Havilland Mosquito aircraft.
Wotan	Kriegsmarine	World War II: The auxiliary river minesweeper was sunk by a mine at km 1805 of the Danube with the loss of two lives.

== 18 September ==
List of shipwrecks: 18 September 1944
Ship	State	Description
Ångermanland	Sweden	World War II: The hulk, formerly a cargo liner, was bombed and sunk by Allied aircraft at Wesermünde, Pomerania Germany.
Ampetco, and Punta Gorda	Belgium; United Kingdom	The tanker Ampetco collided with the cargo ship Punta Gorda in the Caribbean Sea 5 nautical miles (9.3 km) off Cape San Roman, Venezuela (12°15′15″N 70°04′30″W). Punta Gorda exploded and sank, setting Ampteco on fire. Ampetco was declared a constructive total loss. In April 1945, she was sunk as target off Aruba, Netherlands Antilles.
V 601 Dr. Heinrich Wiegand	Kriegsmarine	The auxiliary cruiser was sunk in an Allied air attack on Wesermünde. She was later raised, repaired and returned to service.
F 972	Kriegsmarine	The Type D Marinefahrprahm was sunk on this date.
F 4751	Kriegsmarine	World War II: The Type MZA Marinefährprahm was shelled and sunk in the Ligurian Sea by Allied destroyers.
Gyōkū Maru	Imperial Japanese Army	World War II: The transport ship was torpedoed and sunk in the Yellow Sea (35°02′N 124°24′E) by USS Thresher (United States Navy). 643 troops and 39 crew were killed.
Gyokurei Maru	Japan	World War II: The cargo ship was torpedoed and sunk in the Yellow Sea (35°05′N 124°24′E) by USS Grayback (United States Navy.
Junyō Maru	Imperial Japanese Army	World War II: The Junyō Maru-class cargo ship, considered a hell ship, was torpedoed and sunk in the Indian Ocean off Sumatra, Netherlands East Indies (02°52′S 101°12′E) by HMS Tradewind (Royal Navy). 5,620 prisoners of war (POWs) including 1,382 men of the Royal Netherlands East Indies Army (KNIL) 10th Infantry Battalion, 56 British (mostly Royal Air Force), 8 American and 3 Australian and 4,171 Javanese romusha slave laborers were killed. only 880 survived: 680 POWs and 200 Javanese natives.
KF 461	Kriegsmarine	World War II: The Artilleriefährprahm was shelled and sunk in the Ligurian Sea by Allied destroyers.
KF 597	Kriegsmarine	World War II: The Artilleriefährprahm was shelled and sunk in the Ligurian Sea by Allied destroyers.
KS 12	Kriegsmarine	The KS 7-class light schnellboot was lost on this date.
Katzback	Kriegsmarine	The trials ship was lost on this date.
M 3661	Kriegsmarine	The KFK-2-class naval drifter/minesweeper was sunk on this date.
M 3663	Kriegsmarine	World War II: The minesweeper was sunk in the Meuse (Dutch: Maas) by Allied aircraft.
M 3667	Kriegsmarine	World War II: The minesweeper was severely damaged in the Maas by Allied aircraft.
M 4618 Boulonnais	Kriegsmarine	The naval trawler/minesweeper was lost on this date.
Punta Gorda	United Kingdom	The tanker (2,395 GRT, 1928) collided with Ampetco (Belgium) in the Caribbean Sea 5 nautical miles (9.3 km) off Cape San Roman, Venezuela (12°15′15″N 70°04′30″W). Punta Gorda exploded and sank, setting Ampteco on fire. Ampetco was declared a constructive total loss.
R-178	Kriegsmarine	World War II: The Type R-151 minesweeper was scuttled at Saloniki, Greece.
Rokko Maru	Japan	World War II: The transport ship was torpedoed and sunk in the Pacific Ocean by USS Pipefish (United States Navy).
S 145	Kriegsmarine	World War II: The Type 1939/40 motor torpedo boat was sunk in an air attack at Brest.
S 183	Kriegsmarine	World War II: The torpedo boat was shelled and sunk in the English Channel by HMS Stayner, HMMTB 724 and HMMTB 728 (all Royal Navy).
S 200	Kriegsmarine	World War II: The torpedo boat was shelled and sunk in the English Channel by HMS Stayner, HMMTB 724 and HMMTB 728 (all Royal Navy).
S 702	Kriegsmarine	World War II: The torpedo boat was shelled and sunk in the English Channel by HMS Stayner, HMMTB 724 and HMMTB 728 (all Royal Navy).
Saigon Maru	Imperial Japanese Navy	World War II: The auxiliary gunboat/minelayer was torpedoed and sunk off Manila Bay (14°20′N 120°05′E) by USS Flasher (United States Navy). Six crewmen were killed. Survivors were rescued by Uzuki and Yūzuki (both Imperial Japanese Navy).
UJ 1701 Posen	Kriegsmarine	The naval trawler/submarine chaser was sunk on this date.

== 19 September ==
List of shipwrecks: 19 September 1944
Ship	State	Description
AF 87	Kriegsmarine	World War II: The Type D Artilleriefährprahm was sunk in an Allied air raid on Dordrecht, South Holland, Netherlands.
AF 89	Kriegsmarine	World War II: The Type D Artilleriefährprahm was sunk in the Scheldt during an Allied air raid.
Edit H	Germany	World War II: The cargo ship struck a mine and was damaged. She was towed to Copenhagen, Denmark where she was declared a constructive total loss. Scrapped in October 1948.
Fuchu Maru	Japan	World War II: The cargo ship was damaged in an air attack at Rabaul, New Guinea and beached near the Vulcan Volcano. Salvaged in September, 1945 and towed to Newcastle, Australia, later sold.
Generoso	Switzerland	World War II: For the sweeping of German sea mines in the port of Marseille by the US and Free French navies, the ship was ordered to move from her base at the Bassin de la Gare Maritime. During this relocation, the ship rammed a mine at 12:47, which sunk her and killed the master and two local carpenters.
Isoshima	Imperial Japanese Navy	World War II: The escort ship (a.k.a. Isojima) was torpedoed and sunk in the Pacific Ocean off Honshu (33°40′N 138°20′E) by USS Shad (United States Navy).
Jingei	Imperial Japanese Navy	World War II: The Jingei-class submarine tender was torpedoed and her bow damaged by USS Scabbardfish (United States Navy) 80 nautical miles (150 km) north west of Okinawa (27°35′N 127°07′E). She was towed to Okinawa and beached.
USS LCI(G)-459	United States Navy	The landing craft infantry (gunboat) sank off Palau.
Lynx	Norway	World War II: The cargo ship (1,366 GRT, 1925) was bombed and sunk in the Norwegian Sea off Askvoll, Norway, by Bristol Beaufighter aircraft of 235 and 248 Squadrons, Royal Air Force and de Havilland Mosquito aircraft of 404 Squadron, Royal Canadian Air Force.
M 4453 Cuxhaven	Kriegsmarine	The auxiliary minesweeper/naval trawler was lost on this date.
MAL 14	Kriegsmarine	World War II: The MAL 1A type landing fire support lighter was scuttled in Lake Peipus to prevent capture.
MAL 21	Kriegsmarine	World War II: The MAL 1A type landing fire support lighter was scuttled in Lake Peipus to prevent capture.
Monica	Germany	World War II: The coaster was sunk in a British air raid on Wesermünde, Lower Saxony.
No. 49	Soviet Navy	The auxiliary minesweeper was lost on this date.
USS PT-371	United States Navy	World War II: The Vosper 70 foot-class PT boat ran aground off Doitia Harbor, Halmahera Island and was scuttled.
S-183, S-200 and S-702	Kriegsmarine	World War II: The Type 1939/40 motor torpedo boats were shelled and sunk by HMS Stayner, HMS MTB 724 and HMS MTB 728 (all Royal Navy).
StuBo 1026	Kriegsmarine	The StuBo42 type landing craft/motor launch was sunk on this date.
StuBo 1040	Kriegsmarine	The StuBo42 type landing craft/motor launch was sunk on this date.
Stillesee	Germany	World War II: The cargo ship was sunk in a British air raid on Wesermünde.
T-153	Imperial Japanese Navy	World War II: The landing ship was bombed and sunk at Chichijima in an American air raid.
Tosei Maru No. 2	Japan	World War II: The coastal tanker was torpedoed and sunk in the South China Sea east of Formosa by USS Bang (United States Navy).
Tsukiura Maru	Japan	World War II: The cargo ship was bombed and sunk in an American air raid on Chichijima.
Tyrifjord	Norway	World War II: The cargo ship (3,080 GRT, 1919) was bombed and damaged off the Stavenes Lighthouse, Norway, by Bristol Beaufighter aircraft of 235 and 248 Squadrons, Royal Air Force and de Havilland Mosquito aircraft of 404 Squadron Royal Canadian Air Force. She was beached at Askvol and was declared a total loss.
U-407	Kriegsmarine	World War II: The Type VIIC submarine was depth charged and sunk in the Mediterranean Sea off Milos, Greece (36°27′N 24°33′E) by ORP Garland (Marynarka Wojenna Rzeczypospolitej Polskiej), HMS Terpsichore and HMS Troubridge (both Royal Navy) with the loss of five of her 53 crew.
U-565	Kriegsmarine	World War II: The Type VIIC submarine was badly damaged by bombs during an American air raid on Salamis Naval Base, Salamis, Greece. She suffered additional damage during another raid on 24 September and was scuttled on 30 September.
U-867	Kriegsmarine	World War II: The Type IXC/40 submarine was depth charged and sunk in the North Sea west of Bergen, Norway (62°15′N 1°50′E) by a Consolidated B-24 Liberator aircraft of 224 Squadron, Royal Air Force with the loss of all 60 crew.

== 20 September ==
List of shipwrecks: 20 September 1944
Ship	State	Description
Asaku Maru	Japan	World War II: The cargo ship was bombed and sunk in an American air raid on a Formosan port.
F 391	Kriegsmarine	The Type A Marinefahrprahm was sunk on this date.
F 926	Kriegsmarine	The Type DM minelayer Marinefährprahm was damaged beyond repair by an air attack in Zadar.
Friesak	Kriegsmarine	The auxiliary river minesweeper was sunk on this date.
Friesenland	Germany	World War II: The cargo ship was torpedoed and damaged in the Norwegian Sea off the North Cape, Norway by Soviet aircraft. She was consequently beached. She was refloated in October and repaired.
Gokoku Maru	Japan	World War II: The cargo ship was bombed and sunk in an American air raid on a Formosan port.
KT 18 Pelikan	Kriegsmarine	World War II: The torpedo boat was bombed and damaged in the Bay of Naoussa by Bristol Beaufighter aircraft of the Royal Air Force. She was beached.
M 132	Kriegsmarine	World War II: The minesweeper was torpedoed and sunk in the North Sea 11 nautical miles (20 km) off the Eigerøy Lighthouse, Norway (58°24′N 5°34′E) by HMS Sceptre (Royal Navy) with the loss of 11 lives.
M 3133	Kriegsmarine	The KFK-2-class naval drifter/minesweeper was sunk on this date.
Shinsho Maru	Japan	World War II: The cargo ship was bombed and sunk in an American air raid on a Formosan port.
Vela	Norway	World War II: The cargo ship (1,180 GRT, 1930) was torpedoed and sunk in the North Sea 11 nautical miles (20 km) off the Eigerøy Lighthouse by HMS Sceptre (Royal Navy).

== 21 September ==
List of shipwrecks: 21 September 1944
Ship	State	Description
Amahi Maru	Japan	World War II: The cargo ship was bombed and sunk by United States Navy aircraft while anchored in Manila Bay off Manila, the Philippines, at 14°35′N 120°55′E.
Awaji Maru	Japan	World War II: Convoy TAMA-26: The cargo ship was torpedoed and sunk in the South China Sea of Bangui Bay, Luzon, Philippines (18°34′N 120°53′E) by USS Picuda (United States Navy). 284 passengers, three troops, and 40 crewmen were killed. Survivors were rescued by Nichinan Maru (Japan).
CD-5	Imperial Japanese Navy	World War II: Convoy MATA-27: The Type C escort ship was bombed and sunk in the South China Sea by United States Navy aircraft west of Masinloc, Luzon, Philippines (15°30′N 119°50′E).
China Maru	Imperial Japanese Army	World War II: The Daifuku Maru No. 1-class auxiliary transport was bombed and sunk by United States Navy aircraft while anchored in Manila Bay off Manila, the Philippines, at 14°35′N 120°55′E. Three killed.
Choapa	Chile	The cargo ship collided with Empire Garrick and Voco (both United Kingdom) and sank in the Atlantic Ocean off New York, United States (40°16′N 73°47′W).
Eikyu Maru	Imperial Japanese Army	World War II: The transport (6,862 GRT) was bombed and sunk by United States Navy aircraft while anchored in Manila Bay off Manila, Philippines (14°35′N 120°55′E). 15 crew and 4 gunners were killed.
Fukuei Maru	Imperial Japanese Army	World War II: The transport was bombed and sunk by United States Navy aircraft while anchored in Manila Bay off Manila, the Philippines, at 14°35′N 120°55′E.
Fumi Maru No. 2	Imperial Japanese Navy	World War II: The auxiliary minelayer was torpedoed and sunk in the Pacific Ocean by USS Shad (United States Navy).
HA-58	Imperial Japanese Navy	World War II: The Type C Kō-hyōteki-class midget submarine, inoperable because of earlier air attacks, was scuttled in Kaoe Bay, Halmahera Island.
Hioki Maru	Japan	World War II: The Type 1K ore carrier was bombed and sunk by United States Navy aircraft in Manila Bay (14°35′N 120°35′E).
Hōfuku Maru	Imperial Japanese Navy	World War II: Convoy MATA-27: The Daifuku Maru No. 1-class auxiliary transport was torpedoed and sunk in the South China Sea by United States Navy aircraft west of Masinloc. 144 troops, 1,047 prisoners of war (POWs), and 11 crewmen were killed. 242 Dutch/British POWs swam to shore. 44 POWs were rescued by the escort ships.
Horai Maru No. 2	Japan	World War II: The tanker was bombed and sunk by United States Navy aircraft while anchored in Manila Bay off Manila, the Philippines, at 14°35′N 120°55′E.
Hygea	Norway	World War II: The coaster (98 or 104 GRT, 1914) was bombed and sunk in the North Sea off Lista, Norway by Bristol Beaufighter aircraft of 144, 235, and 248 Squadrons, Royal Air Force and de Havilland Mosquito aircraft of 404 Squadron, Royal Canadian Air Force with the loss of one of her four crew.
Katsuriki	Imperial Japanese Navy	World War II: The survey ship was torpedoed and sunk in the Pacific Ocean 80 nautical miles (150 km; 92 mi) south west of Manila (13°35′N 119°06′E) by USS Haddo (United States Navy). 40 crew survived the sinking, but drowned themselves to prevent capture.
Kyokutō Maru	Imperial Japanese Navy	World War II: The oiler (a.k.a. Oyashima Maru in non military records) was bombed and sunk by United States Navy aircraft in Manila Bay (14°25′N 120°55′E). Survivors were rescued by Shoryu Maru (Japan). Raised in October 1944. Bombed and sunk again on 19 November 1944. Raised, repaired and put back into service post-war as California Maru.
M 3153	Kriegsmarine	World War II: The auxiliary minesweeper was sunk in the Baltic Sea off Ventspils, Lithuania by Soviet aircraft.
M 3155	Kriegsmarine	World War II: The KFK-2-class naval drifter/minesweeper was sunk in the Baltic Sea off Ventspils by Soviet aircraft.
Max Strinsky	Kriegsmarine	World War II: The seaplane tender struck a mine and was severely damaged in Altafjord. She was beached.
Mizuho Maru	Imperial Japanese Army	World War II: Convoy TAMA-26: The Mizuho Maru-class auxiliary transport was torpedoed and sunk in the South China Sea off Bangui Bay, Luzon (18°37′N 120°41′E) by USS Redfish (United States Navy). A total of 1,313 passengers, three gunners, and 81 crewmen were killed. W-20 (Imperial Japanese Navy) rescued 370, Toyo Maru No. 3 (Japan) rescued 980, the rescue tug Keishu Maru (Japan) rescued 1,630, and motor sailers Bangi and Saromage (Japan) rescued 268.
Nansei Maru	Imperial Japanese Navy	World War II: Convoy MATA-27: The oiler was bombed and sunk in the South China Sea west of Masinloc by United States Navy aircraft. 12 gunners and 17 crewmen were killed.
Niyo Maru	Japan	World War II: The government-owned, use allotted to the Imperial Japanese Army (IJA), Type 1TL Standard Wartime civilian merchant tanker was bombed and sunk in Manila Bay (14°35′N 120°55′E) by United States Navy aircraft. 21 crewmen were killed.
Norway Maru	Imperial Japanese Army	World War II: The Daifuku Maru No. 1-class transport was bombed and sunk in Manila Bay (14°35′N 120°55′E) by United States Navy aircraft.
Noshiro Maru	Imperial Japanese Navy	World War II: The Nagara Maru-class auxiliary cruiser was bombed and damaged in Manila Bay by United States Navy aircraft. Three troops and six crewmen were killed. She was beached 1.1 miles (1.8 km) from the South Lighthouse (14°33′N 120°57′E) by 24 September.
Ogura Maru No. 1	Imperial Japanese Army	World War II: Convoy MATA-27: The Ogura Maru No. 1-class auxiliary oiler (possibly named Kokura Maru No. 1) was bombed and damaged in the South China Sea west of Masinloc (15°25′N 110°50′E) by United States Navy aircraft. She drifted ashore on the coast near San Marcellino. The wreck was bombed and burned out by North American B-25 Mitchell aircraft of the 345th Bomb Group during bombing practice in March–April 1945.
Okikawa Maru	Japan	World War II: The oiler was bombed and sunk by United States Navy aircraft while anchored in Manila Bay off Manila, the Philippines, at 14°35′N 120°55′E.
Risshun Maru	Japan	World War II: The Risshun Maru-class cargo ship (a.k.a. Rissyun Maru) was bombed and sunk by United States Navy aircraft while anchored in the outer harbor of Manila, the Philippines, at 14°35′N 120°55′E.
Rizan Maru	Japan	World War II: Convoy KIRA-803: The cargo ship was torpedoed and sunk in the Sea of Okhotsk (49°36′N 145°30′E) by USS Searaven (United States Navy). A total of 173 troops, 33 gunners, and 81 crewmen were killed.
Rozan Maru	Japan	World War II: The cargo ship was torpedoed and sunk in the South China Sea (14°35′N 120°55′E) by United States Navy carrier-based aircraft.
Satsuki	Imperial Japanese Navy	World War II: The Mutsuki-class destroyer was bombed and sunk in Manila Bay (15°35′N 120°55′E) by United States Navy aircraft. 52 crewmen were killed and 15 were wounded. Some survivors were rescued by Irako (Imperial Japanese Navy).
Shch-402	Soviet Navy	World War II: The Shchuka-class submarine was bombed and sunk in the Norwegian Sea by Douglas Boston aircraft of the 36th Mines Torpedo Regiment, Soviet Air Forces with all 45 hands.
Shichiyo Maru	Imperial Japanese Navy	World War II: Convoy MATA-27: The oiler was bombed and sunk in the South China Sea west of Masinloc by United States Navy aircraft. 12 crewmen were killed.
SF 297	Kriegsmarine	The Siebel ferry was lost on this date.
SF 300	Kriegsmarine	The Siebel ferry was lost on this date.
Soerabaya Maru	Japan	World War II: The cargo ship was bombed and sunk by United States Navy aircraft while anchored in Manila Bay off Manila, the Philippines, at 14°35′N 120°55′E.
Sunosaki	Imperial Japanese Navy	World War II: The Sunosaki-class oiler was bombed and wrecked by United States Navy aircraft while drydocked in the Dewey Drydock at Cavite Navy Yard, Manila, Philippines. Towed into Manila Bay and abandoned on 4 October.
Surakarta Maru	Imperial Japanese Army	World War II: Convoy MATA-27: The Type 2A Wartime Standard cargo ship (6,886 GRT) was bombed and sunk in the South China Sea off Masinloc, Luzon (15°25′N 119°50′E), by United States Navy aircraft. A crewman was killed.
Toyofuku Maru	Imperial Japanese Army	World War II: The transport was bombed and sunk by United States Navy aircraft while anchored in Manila Bay off Manila, the Philippines, at 14°35′N 120°55′E.
Tsukubasan Maru	Imperial Japanese Army	World War II: The transport was bombed and sunk by United States Navy aircraft while anchored in Manila Bay off Manila, the Philippines, at 14°35′N 120°55′E.
Vangsnes	Norway	World War II: The coaster (215 GRT, 1910) was bombed and sunk in the North Sea off Lista, Norway, by Bristol Beaufighter aircraft of 144, 235 and 248 Squadrons, RAF and de Havilland Mosquito aircraft of 404 Squadron RCAF with the loss of one crewman.
Wakashiro Maru	Imperial Japanese Army	World War II: The transport was bombed and sunk by United States Navy aircraft while anchored in Manila Bay off Manila, the Philippines, at 14°35′N 120°55′E.
Yamabuki Maru	Imperial Japanese Army	World War II: The transport was bombed and sunk by United States Navy aircraft while anchored in Manila Bay off Manila, the Philippines, at 14°35′N 120°55′E.
Yamakaze Maru	Japan	World War II: The cargo ship was bombed and sunk by United States Navy aircraft while anchored in Manila Bay off Manila, the Philippines, at 14°35′N 120°55′E.
Yozan Maru	Imperial Japanese Army	World War II: The Type 1A Standard cargo ship class auxiliary transport was bombed and sunk by United States Navy aircraft while anchored in Manila Bay off Manila, the Philippines, at 14°35′N 120°55′E.
Yuki Maru	Imperial Japanese Navy	World War II: Convoy MATA-27: The oiler was bombed and sunk in the South China Sea west of Masinloc by United States Navy aircraft. 42 crewmen were killed.
Three unknown submarines	Imperial Japanese Navy	World War II: Three unidentified Imperial Japanese Navy midget submarines were scuttled at Saipan.

== 22 September ==
List of shipwrecks: 22 September 1944
Ship	State	Description
Ceram Maru	Japan	World War II: The Standard Type 2TM class tanker was bombed and sunk in Manila Harbor, Luzon (14°35′N 120°55′E) by carrier aircraft from Task Force 38. Raised in late 1945 during harbor clearance, taken to deep water and scuttled.
Drache	Kriegsmarine	World War II: The minelayer was bombed and sunk at Vathy, Samos, Greece by Bristol Beaufighter aircraft of the Royal Air Force.
Jungen Go	Imperial Japanese Army	World War II: Convoy MATA-27B: The transport was torpedoed and sunk north west of Manila, Philippines (15°28′N 118°45′E) by USS Lapon (United States Navy) with the loss of 20 crewmen.
KT-709	Kriegsmarine	World War II: The R type minesweeper struck a mine and sank in Narva Bay.
Moero	Germany	World War II: The transport was sunk by Soviet Douglas A-20 Havoc aircraft with bombs and torpedoes in the Baltic Sea off Riga, Latvia (57°26′N 20°18′E). There were 1,273 refugees and wounded aboard. 655 men lost their lives.
Orion	Germany	World War II: The coaster was bombed and sunk in the Aegean Sea off Naxos, Greece by Bristol Beaufighter aircraft of the Royal Air Force.
Peter	Germany	World War II: The ore carrier was torpedoed and sunk in the Gulf of Volos by HMS Vampire (Royal Navy).
Shun Yuan	China	World War II: The cargo ship was torpedoed and sunk in the South China Sea by USS Lapon (United States Navy).
SK-361	Soviet Navy	World War II: The patrol boat struck a mine and sank in the Gulf of Finland north of Juminda, Estonia.
SK-381	Soviet Navy	World War II: The patrol boat struck a mine and sank in Narva Bay.
T-49	Soviet Navy	World War II: The minesweeper struck a mine and sank in Narva Bay.
W. H. Fuller	South Africa	The tug (551 GRT, 1934) struck Doddington Rock, in Algoa Bay, and sank.
XXIV Maggio	Germany	World War II: The cargo ship was sunk at Amsterdam, North Holland, Netherlands. She was later refloated and scrapped.
Zuiderdam	Germany	World War II: The cargo ship was scuttled as a blockship in the Nieuwe Waterweg at Maassluis, South Holland Netherlands. She was refloated on 13 November 1946 and scrapped in 1948.

== 23 September ==
List of shipwrecks: 23 September 1944
Ship	State	Description
Brilliant	Soviet Navy	World War II: Convoy VD 1: The Brilliant-class corvette was torpedoed and sunk in the Kara Sea (76°10′N 87°45′E) by U-957 (Kriegsmarine with the loss of all 64 crew.
Chios	Germany	World War II: The cargo ship struck a mine in the North Sea off Brunsbüttelkoog. She sank the next day.
CHa-94	Imperial Japanese Navy	The CHa-1-class submarine chaser sank off Luzon during a typhoon.
Dinteldijk	Germany	World War II: The cargo ship was scuttled as a blockship at Maassluis, South Holland, Netherlands.
Heiho Maru	Japan	World War II: The cargo ship was sunk in the Celebes Sea by Allied Consolidated PBY Catalina aircraft.
Hermann Schulte	Germany	World War II: The cargo ship was torpedoed and sunk in the North Sea off Borkum, Lower Saxony by Allied aircraft.
Hokkai Maru	Japan	World War II: The Kenai Maru-class auxiliary transport ship (8,416 GRT, 1933) was damaged by a mine 15 nautical miles (28 km; 17 mi) east of Sebuku Island (Seboefoe Island), south east of Borneo, towed to and beached on Sebuco Island. She was refloated 16 November 1944 and towed to Soerabaya.
Hokki Maru	Japan	World War II: The tanker was torpedoed and sunk in the South China Sea by USS Lapon (United States Navy).
Nankai	Imperial Japanese Navy	World War II: The gunboat, a former Regulus-class minelayer, was damaged by a mine 15 nautical miles (28 km; 17 mi) east of Sebuku Island (Seboefoe Island), south east of Borneo, towed to and beached on Sebuco Island. Salvaged, repaired and returned to service.
PiLB 363	Kriegsmarine	The PiLB 40 type landing craft was lost on this date.
Taranto	Kriegsmarine	World War II: The Magdeburg-class cruiser was bombed and sunk by Allied aircraft off La Spezia, Italy. Scrapped in 1946–1947.
Tosho Maru	Imperial Japanese Navy	World War II: The Tosho Maru-class auxiliary transport (1,289 GRT 1937) was bombed and sunk by US Navy land based aircraft off Wowoni, Celebes (04°23′S 122°43′E).
U-859	Kriegsmarine	World War II: The Type IXD2 submarine (2,150 GRT) was torpedoed and sunk in the Strait of Malacca (5°46′N 100°04′E) by HMS Trenchant (Royal Navy) with the loss of 47 of her 66 crew. 11 survivors were rescued by HMS Trenchant and made prisoners of war. The other eight were rescued by the Japanese.

== 24 September ==
List of shipwrecks: 24 September 1944
Ship	State	Description
Akitsushima	Imperial Japanese Navy	World War II: The Akitushima-class seaplane tender was bombed and sunk north west of Coron Bay, Palawan (11°59′N 119°58′E) by United States Navy aircraft. 86 crewmen were killed. Survivors were rescued by W-41 and T-102 (both Imperial Japanese Navy).
CH-32	Imperial Japanese Navy	World War II: The CH-28-class submarine chaser was bombed and sunk south of Mindoro, Philippines (12°15′N 121°00′E) by United States Navy aircraft.
CHa-39	Imperial Japanese Navy	World War II: The CHa-1-class submarine chaser was sunk in the Sibuyan Sea by United States Navy aircraft.
Chuka Maru	Imperial Japanese Army	World War II: The Type 1A Standard cargo ship (a.k.a. Chukwa Maru) was bombed and sunk in the Visayan Sea at (11°13′N 123°11′E) by carrier aircraft from Task Force 38.
Ekkai Maru	Imperial Japanese Navy	World War II: The transport was bombed and sunk north west of Coron Bay, two miles (3.2 km) south of Conception, Palawan (12°01′N 119°58′E) by United States Navy carrier-based aircraft. 15 passengers and 44 crewmen were killed.
Hayabusa	Imperial Japanese Navy	World War II: The Otori-class torpedo boat was bombed and sunk south of Mindoro (13°00′N 122°00′E) by United States Navy aircraft.
I-O-100	Kriegsmarine	World War II: The Siebelgefäß landing craft was sunk by gunfire from three British destroyers east of Scarpanto.
I-O-107	Kriegsmarine	World War II: The Siebelgefäß landing craft was sunk by gunfire from three British destroyers east of Scarpanto.
Irako	Imperial Japanese Navy	World War II: The Irako-class victuals supply ship was bombed and damaged by United States Navy aircraft in Coron Bay and was beached on Busuanga Island (11°58′N 120°02′E). She slid off the beach and sank.
Kenwa Maru	Imperial Japanese Army	World War II: The Type 1A Standard cargo ship was bombed and sunk in the Visayan Sea at (11°13′N 123°11′E) by carrier aircraft from Task Force 38.
Kogyo Maru	Imperial Japanese Navy	World War II: The Koshin Maru-class auxiliary transport was bombed and sunk in Coron Bay, off Busuanga Island, Palawan (12°00′N 120°00′E) by United States Navy aircraft. 35 crewmen were killed.
Kyokuzen Maru	Imperial Japanese Navy	World War II: The transport was bombed and sunk north west of Coron Bay, two nautical miles (3.7 km; 2.3 mi) south of Conception, Palawan (12°01′N 119°58′E) by United States Navy aircraft.
Meyersledge	Germany	World War II: The transport was bombed and sunk in the Baltic Sea off Pärnu by Soviet Douglas A-20 Havoc aircraft.
Nissho Maru No. 16	Imperial Japanese Navy	World War II: The Nissho Maru No. 16-class auxiliary transport was sunk by a mine near Ikulong Island, Philippines with the loss of 13 crewmen.
NS 01 Hexe	Kriegsmarine	The naval whaler was lost on this date.
Okikawa Maru	Imperial Japanese Navy	World War II: The 1TL-class oiler (a.k.a. Okigawa Maru) was bombed and sunk north west of Coron Bay, 2 nautical miles (3.7 km) south of Conception, Palawan (12°01′N 119°58′E) by United States Navy aircraft. Three gunners and five crewmen were killed.
Olympia Maru	Imperial Japanese Army	World War II: The Columbia Maru-class aeronautical repair ship was bombed and sunk north west of Coron Bay, two nautical miles (3.7 km; 2.3 mi) south of Conception, Palawan (12°01′N 119°58′E) by United States Navy aircraft. Two passengers, three gunners and 14 crewmen were killed.
Shinyo Maru	Imperial Japanese Navy	World War II: Convoy C-203: The Shinsei Maru-class auxiliary storeship (4,736 GRT 1918) was bombed and sunk eight nautical miles (15 km; 9.2 mi) south east of Kahidokan, Sibuyan Island, Philippines (12°23′N 122°50′E) by US Navy carrier aircraft.
Siberia Maru	Imperial Japanese Army	World War II: The Siberia Maru-class auxiliary transport was bombed and sunk in Jintololo Channel, Asid Gulf, north west of Pulandata Point, Musbate, Philippines (11°56′N 123°08′E) by United States Navy aircraft. A total of 95 troops and 63 crewmen were killed. Wreck salvaged by USS Chanticleer (United States Navy) from 28 June to 14 July 1945.
T-120	Soviet Navy	World War II: The Admirable-class minesweeper was torpedoed and sunk in the Kara Sea (at 75°15′N 84°30′E) by U-739 (Kriegsmarine). 41 crew died during the sinking and the next days, 44 were rescued.
T-127	Imperial Japanese Navy	World War II: The No.101-class landing ship was bombed and sunk off Ticao Island, near San Fernando, Philippines (14°35′N 120°59′E) by US carrier aircraft from Task Force 38.
Taiei Maru	Imperial Japanese Navy	World War II: The oiler was bombed and sunk north west of Coron Bay, two nautical miles (3.7 km; 2.3 mi) south of Conception, Palawan (12°01′N 119°58′E) by United States Navy aircraft. Three passengers, three gunners and five crewmen were killed.
U-565	Kriegsmarine	World War II: The Type VIIC submarine, already damaged by bombs during an American air raid on Salamis Naval Base, Greece, on 19 September, suffered additional bomb damage during another American air raid there, losing five crewmen during the two raids. She was consequently scuttled on 30 September off the Salamis Naval Base.
U-596	Kriegsmarine	World War II: The Type VIIC submarine suffered bomb damage in an American air raid on Salamis Naval Base, Greece, with one crewman killed. She subsequently was scuttled on 30 September.
UJ 2108	Kriegsmarine	World War II: The submarine chaser was scuttled at Piraeus, Greece.
V 5502 Biber	Kriegsmarine	World War II: The Vorpostenboot/naval whaler was bombed and sunk in Hjeltefjorden, Norway by de Havilland Mosquito aircraft of 248 Squadron, Royal Air Force with the loss of one of her eight crew.
USS YMS-19	United States Navy	World War II: The YMS-1-class minesweeper was sunk by a mine off Angaur, Palau (06°53′N 134°10′E). Nine of her 36 crew were killed.
Yaeyama	Imperial Japanese Navy	World War II: The Yaeyama-class minelayer was bombed and sunk south of Mindoro (12°15′N 121°00′E) by United States Navy aircraft.

== 25 September ==
List of shipwrecks: 25 September 1944
Ship	State	Description
Bushu Maru	Japan	World War II: The cargo ship was torpedoed and sunk in the Tokara Islands by the submarine USS Barbel (United States Navy).
Fisher Boy	United States	The 18-gross register ton, 41.6-foot (12.7 m) fishing vessel was lost after colliding with the motor vessel Admiralty (United States) in Washington Bay (56°43′00″N 134°23′20″W) in Southeast Alaska.
M 471	Kriegsmarine	World War II: The minesweeper was sunk in the North Sea off Den Helder, North Holland, the Netherlands, by Bristol Beaufighter aircraft of 236 & 255 Squadrons, Royal Air Force, 455 Squadron, Royal Australian Air Force and 489 Squadron, Royal New Zealand Air Force.
USS Miantonomah	United States Navy	World War II: The minelayer struck a mine and sank in the English Channel (49°26′29″N 0°11′31″E) with the loss of 58 of her 202 crew.
Nissei Maru	Japan	World War II: The cargo ship was torpedoed and sunk in the Yellow Sea by the submarine USS Thresher (United States Navy).
Miyakawa Maru No. 2	Japan	World War II: The coaster was torpedoed and sunk in the South China Sea east of Korea by the submarine USS Guardfish (United States Navy).
Rokkosan Maru	Japan	World War II: The cargo ship was bombed and sunk in the South China Sea south west of Formosa by aircraft of the United States Army Air Forces Fourteenth Air Force.
V 6101 Gaulieter Bohle	Kriegsmarine	World War II: The Vorpostenboot was bombed and sunk off Northern Norway by Soviet Curtiss Kittyhawk, Ilyushin Il-2, and Yakovlev Yak-9 aircraft, with 34 crewmen killed and nine wounded.
V 6105	Kriegsmarine	World War II: The Vorpostenboot was bombed and damaged off Northern Norway by Soviet Curtiss Kittyhawk, Ilyushin Il-2, and Yakovlev Yak-9 aircraft. She was beached to prevent her from sinking.
Vol	Greece	World War II: The sailing vessel was sunk by gunfire in the Aegean Sea off Cape Drepanum by the submarine HMS Vigorous (Royal Navy).

== 26 September ==
List of shipwrecks: 26 September 1944
Ship	State	Description
Aotaka	Imperial Japanese Navy	World War II: The Hatsutaka-class minelayer was torpedoed and sunk in the South China Sea (07°00′N 116°00′E) 90 nautical miles (170 km) west of northern Borneo by USS Pargo (United States Navy).
Don Marquis	United States	World War II: The Liberty ship collided with Missionary Ridge (United States) in the Pacific Ocean (2°10′S 147°32′E). She caught fire and was beached. Declared a constructive total loss, she subsequently served with the United States Navy as a hulk.
Elihu Thompson	United States	World War II: The cargo ship was damaged by a mine and beached at Nouméa, New Caledonia. 32 troops were killed. Survivors were rescued by USS Apache (United States Navy).
Koetsu Maru	Japan	World War II: `The cargo ship was torpedoed and sunk in the Yellow Sea by USS Thresher (United States Navy).
Kuzbass	Soviet Union	The cargo ship was driven ashore and wrecked in Lake Krasnoye.
HMS LCA 848 and HMS LCA 1378	Royal Navy	The landing craft assaults (5,9/8,2 t, 1943) were lost on this date.
HMS LCP(R) 999	Royal Navy	The landing craft personnel (ramped) (8,5/11,5 t, 1942) was lost on this date.
M 3247	Kriegsmarine	The KFK 2-class naval drifter/minesweeper was lost on this date.
Ro-47	Imperial Japanese Navy	World War II: The Kaichu type submarine was depth charged, hedgehogged and sunk in the Pacific Ocean by USS McCoy Reynolds (United States Navy) with all 76 hands.
Saga	Imperial Japanese Navy	World War II: The Saga-class river gunboat was mined and sunk at Hong Kong. Later raised, repaired and returned to service.
U-871	Kriegsmarine	World War II: The Type IXD2 submarine was depth charged and sunk in the Atlantic Ocean north west of the Azores, Portugal (43°18′N 36°28′W) by a Boeing B-17 Flying Fortress of 220 Squadron, Royal Air Force with the loss of all 69 crew.
UJ 1106 Grönland	Kriegsmarine	World War II: The submarine chaser struck a mine and sank off Feiestein, Norway.
V 6719	Kriegsmarine	World War II: The Vorpostenboot struck a mine and sank in the Baltic Sea off Swinemünde, Pomerania.

== 27 September ==
List of shipwrecks: 27 September 1944
Ship	State	Description
Breisgau	Germany	World War II: The tanker was scuttled as a blockship at Waalhaven, South Holland, Netherlands. She was refloated on24 June 1946. Subsequently repaired and entered French service in June 1948 as Salomé.
CD-10	Imperial Japanese Navy	World War II: The Type D escort ship was torpedoed and sunk in the East China Sea 100 nautical miles (190 km) north north east of the Amami O Shima (29°26′N 128°50′E) by USS Plaice (United States Navy). 148 crewmen were killed. Eight survivors were rescued by CD-11 (Imperial Japanese Navy).
Cläre Hugo Stinnes I	Germany	World War II: The cargo ship struck a mine laid by a French submarine and sank in the North Sea off Jæren, Norway (58°45′N 5°24′E) with the loss of 52 lives.
F 203	Kriegsmarine	The Type AM Marinefahrprahm minelayer was sunk on this date.
Hachirogata Maru	Japan	World War II: The cargo ship was torpedoed and sunk in the Pacific Ocean off the Kuril Islands by USS Apogon (United States Navy). Two survivors were rescued.
Hokki Maru	Japan	World War II: Convoy MIMA 11: The British World War I Standard War Z Class tanker was torpedoed and sunk in the South China Sea 140 nautical miles (260 km) west of Cape Bolinao, Luzon, Philippines (15°50′N 117°41′E) by USS Lapon (United States Navy). Two crewmen were killed.
PC-62 Ivo	Yugoslav Partisans	World War II: The small patrol boat ran aground and was captured later by German assault boats. One crewman was killed.
Knute Nelson	Norway	World War II: The cargo ship (5,749 GRT, 1926) struck a mine laid by a submarine and sank off Jæren (58°45′N 5°24′E) with the loss of 17 lives.
KT-407	Soviet Navy	World War II: The KM-II-class minesweeper struck a mine and sank in the Gulf of Finland north of Juminda, Estonia.
USS LCT-823	United States Navy	World War II: The LCT-1-class landing craft tank ran aground and sank off Palau.
HMS Rockingham	Royal Navy	World War II: The Clemson-class destroyer (1,190/1,590 t, 1919) struck a mine in the North Sea and was damaged. She was taken under tow but later sank 30 nautical miles (56 km) south east of Aberdeen (56°29′N 00°57′W).
Salomea	Greece	World War II: The coaster (751 GRT, 1897) was torpedoed and sunk at Cassandreia by HMS Vigorous (Royal Navy).
San Blas	United States	The tanker exploded and sank in the River Plate. The wreck was subsequently broken up.
SF 121	Kriegsmarine	World War II: The Siebel ferry was torpedoed and sunk at Cassandreia by HMS Vigorous (Royal Navy).
TA7	Kriegsmarine	World War II: The torpedo boat was sunk at Horten, Norway by Norwegian saboteurs.
Tachibana Maru	Japan	World War II: The tanker was torpedoed and sunk west of Luzon by USS Lapon and USS Flasher (both United States Navy).
Tateishi Maru	Imperial Japanese Army	World War II: The Eastern Guide-class auxiliary transport was attacked and severely damaged by US Navy Consolidated PBY Catalina aircraft at (06°02′N 121°29′E). She was beached on Jolo, Philippines.
UJ 1715 Lesum	Kriegsmarine	World War II: The submarine chaser struck a mine laid by a submarine and sank off Jæren with the loss of 59 of the 61 people on board.
Ural Maru	Imperial Japanese Army	World War II: Convoy MIMA 11: The Ural Maru-class auxiliary transport was torpedoed and sunk in the South China Sea 140 nautical miles (260 km) west of Cape Bolinao, Luzon, Philippines (15°55′N 117°16′E) by USS Flasher (United States Navy). A total of 144 troops, five gunners, and 40 crewmen were killed. Survivors were rescued by Imperial Japanese Navy submarine chasers. 120 nurses and passengers were transferred to Zuiho Maru. She was sunk on 1 October killing 45 of the survivors.
V 1214 Joannes Giorgius	Kriegsmarine	World War II: The Vorpostenboot struck a mine and sank in the North Sea off Sylt.
USS YG-39	United States Navy	The self-propelled garbage lighter was lost on this date.

== 28 September ==
List of shipwrecks: 28 September 1944
Ship	State	Description
AF 25	Kriegsmarine	World War II: The Artilleriefährprahm was sunk in the Norwegian Sea off Vadsø, Norway by Soviet aircraft.
Anjo Maru	Imperial Japanese Navy	World War II: The Anjo Maru-class tanker was torpedoed and sunk in the South China Sea off Mindoro, Philippines (13°13′N 120°04′E) by USS Bonefish (United States Navy). 17 crewmen were killed.
Dragoner	Kriegsmarine	World War II: The minesweeper was sunk off Mandal, Norway by Royal Air Force aircraft.
HMS ML 216	Royal Navy	The Fairmile B motor launch (76/86 t, 1941) sank in the North Sea off the east coast of England.
No. 67	Soviet Navy	The KM-4-class river minesweeping launch was sunk on this date.
I/7 Orion	Kriegsmarine	The Siebel ferry was lost on this date.
Oslo	Denmark	World War II: The cargo ship struck a mine and sank in the Pomeranian Bight off Swinemünde, Pomerania.
Tone Maru	Japan	World War II: The cargo ship was sunk in the Makassar Strait by Allied Consolidated PBY Catalina aircraft.
TK-26	Soviet Navy	World War II: The D-3-class motor torpedo boat struck a mine and sank in Narva Bay.
TK-67	Soviet Navy	World War II: The motor torpedo boat struck a mine and sank in Narva Bay.
TK-86	Soviet Navy	World War II: The D-3-class motor torpedo boat struck a mine and sank in Narva Bay.
TK-194 Morshanskiy Textilshcik	Soviet Navy	World War II: The D-3-class motor torpedo boat struck a mine and sank in Narva Bay.

== 29 September ==
List of shipwrecks: 29 September 1944
Ship	State	Description
Edward H. Crockett	United States	World War II: Convoy RA 60: The Liberty ship was torpedoed and damaged in the Barents Sea (72°59′N 24°26′E) by U-310 (Kriegsmarine) with the loss of one of her 68 crew. Survivors were rescued by Zamalek (United Kingdom). HMS Milne (Royal Navy) later scuttled the ship.
Ekisan Maru	Japan	World War II: The cargo ship was torpedoed and sunk in the Pacific Ocean by USS Skate (United States Navy).
Hoei Maru	Imperial Japanese Navy	World War II: The auxiliary minesweeper was torpedoed and sunk in the Pacific Ocean south of Okinawa by USS Skate (United States Navy).
K 2	Kriegsmarine	World War II: The gunboat was severely damaged in an Allied air raid on Delfzijl, South Holland, Netherlands. She was not repaired.
Samsuva	United Kingdom	World War II: Convoy RA 60: The Liberty ship (7,219 GRT, 1944) was torpedoed and damaged in the Barents Sea off North Cape, Norway (72°58′N 23°59′E) by U-310 (Kriegsmarine) with the loss of three of her 67 crew. Survivors were rescued by Rathlin (United Kingdom). The ship was scuttled by HMS Bulldog and HMS Musketeer (both Royal Navy).
SF 264, SF 269, SF 291, SF 292 and SF 294	Kriegsmarine	World War II: The Siebel ferries were shelled and sunk at Karpathos, Greece by Royal Navy destroyers.
U-863	Kriegsmarine	World War II: The Type IXD2 submarine was depth charged and sunk in the South Atlantic east south east of Recife, Brazil (10°45′S 25°30′W) by two Consolidated B-24 Liberator aircraft of the United States Navy with the loss of all 69 crew.

== 30 September ==
List of shipwrecks: 30 September 1944
Ship	State	Description
USS Concrete No. 32	United States Navy	The 366-foot (112 m) B7-A1-class concrete-hulled oil barge grounded at Apra, Guam, and she sank in 20 fathoms (120 ft; 37 m) of water near the Glass Breakwater.
Graphite	United States	The 366-foot (112 m) Design B7-D1 concrete-hulled barge was scuttled at Guam (13°46′N 144°00′E) as part of the Glass Breakwater.
Herman von Salza	Kriegsmarine	World War II: The tanker was scuttled at Saint-Nazaire, Loire-Inférieure, France. She was refloated on 4 January 1947, repaired and returned to French service in May 1947 as Vendée.
Kuha 3	Finnish Navy	World War II: Lapland War: The minesweeper was mined and sunk off Suursaari.
Mostun	Norway	World War II: The cargo ship (2,713 GRT, 1938) struck a mine and was damaged in the North Sea north west of Anholt, Denmark (56°51′05″N 10°37′05″E). She capsized and sank the next day with the loss of two crew.
HMS Nabob	Royal Navy	World War II: Operation Goodwood: The Bogue-class escort carrier (11,400/15,390 t, 1943) was torpedoed and damaged in the Barents Sea by U-354 (Kriegsmarine) on 22 September 1944 with the loss of 21 crew. She sailed to Scapa Flow, Orkney Islands where she arrived on 27 August. Declared a constructive total loss, she was beached on 30 September 1944 and cannibalized for spare parts before being returned to the United States Navy in 1946. Refloated on an unknown date. Sold for scrap in The Netherlands in March 1947, and subsequently repaired and converted for merchant service at AG Weser shipyard in Bremen, West Germany, from October 1951 to June 1952.
O. Re 73 Ostland	Kriegsmarine	The armed yacht was lost on this date.
U-565	Kriegsmarine	World War II: The Type VIIC submarine was scuttled off Skaramangas, Greece, at (37°57′N 23°40′E) after suffering bomb damage in raids by American aircraft on Salamis Naval Base on 19 and 24 September.
U-596	Kriegsmarine	World War II: The Type VIIC submarine was scuttled in Salamis Bay, Greece, at (37°59′N 23°34′E) after suffering bomb damage in an American air raid on Salamis Naval Base on 24 September.
U-1062	Kriegsmarine	World War II: The Type VIIF submarine was depth charged and sunk in the Atlantic Ocean west south west of the Cape Verde Islands (11°36′N 34°44′W) by USS Fessenden (United States Navy) with the loss of all 55 crew.
V 405 J. Hinr. Wilhelms	Kriegsmarine	The Vorpostenboot was sunk on this date.

== Unknown date ==
List of shipwrecks: Unknown date 1944
Ship	State	Description
Arnuf	Kriegsmarine	The auxiliary river minesweeper was sunk sometime in September.
Borneo	Germany	World War II: The incomplete cargo ship was scuttled as a blockship. She was refloated in 1945, completed and entered Dutch service in 1947.
CHa-160	Imperial Japanese Navy	The CHa-1-class submarine chaser sank off Yoshimi during a typhoon, either on 18 September 1944 or 18 September 1945.
Chenggong	Republic of China Navy	The Shi 34-class motor torpedo boat was lost sometime in September.
Chungmu	Republic of China Navy	The Shi 34-class motor torpedo boat was lost sometime in September.
Conmar	United States	The cargo ship foundered south east of Fort Lauderdale, Florida at 26°00′N 80°00′W sometime in September.
F 122	Kriegsmarine	The Type A Marinefahrprahm was sunk sometime in September. Later salvaged by the Soviets.
F 137	Kriegsmarine	The Type A Marinefahrprahm was sunk sometime in September.
F 142	Kriegsmarine	The Type A Marinefahrprahm was sunk sometime in September.
F 382	Kriegsmarine	The Type A Marinefahrprahm was sunk sometime in September.
F 401	Kriegsmarine	The Type C Marinefahrprahm was sunk sometime in September.
F 537	Kriegsmarine	The Type C Marinefahrprahm was sunk sometime in September.
F 558	Kriegsmarine	The Type C2 Marinefahrprahm was sunk sometime in September.
F 578	Kriegsmarine	The Type C2 Marinefahrprahm was sunk sometime in September.
F 0767	Kriegsmarine	The MZ-B Marinefährprahm was sunk sometime in September.
HNLMS Freyr	Kriegsmarine	World War II: The Thor-class river gunboat was scuttled as a block ship at Den Helder sometime in September. Raised and scrapped in November 1947.
HI 08 Twee Gebroeders	Kriegsmarine	The naval drifter was lost some time in September.
Hadju	Kriegsmarine	The auxiliary river minesweeper was sunk sometime in September.
Havre Maru	Japan	After suffering a bent propeller shaft she was towed to Jolo on 24 August. After the next "few weeks" of repair she was driven aground by a heavy rainstorm on a sand bar 2,000 metres (6,600 ft) north east of Jolo town at 06°03′N 120°59′E. The ship was not refloated.
Hugin	Norway	World War II: The damaged coaster was scuttled at Vadsø sometime in September or October.
Jacqueline	Germany	World War II: The cargo ship was scuttled at Bayonne, Basses-Pyrénées, France by German forces.
Kefa	Republic of China Navy	The Shi 34-class motor torpedo boat was lost sometime in September.
HMS LCP(L) 84, HMS LCP(L) 85, HMS LCP(L) 88, HMS LCP(L) 97, HMS LCP(L) 98, HMS LCP(L) 110, HMS LCP(L) 118, HMS LCP(L) 128, HMS LCP(L) 137, HMS LCP(L) 145, HMS LCP(L) 146, HMS LCP(L) 149, HMS LCP(L) 162, HMS LCP(L) 163, HMS LCP(L) 198, HMS LCP(L) 200, HMS LCP(L) 230, HMS LCP(L) 231, HMS LCP(L) 232, HMS LCP(L) 233, HMS LCP(L) 235, HMS LCP(L) 238, HMS LCP(L) 239, HMS LCP(L) 241, HMS LCP(L) 242, HMS LCP(L) 246, HMS LCP(L) 247, HMS LCP(L) 269, HMS LCP(L) 293, HMS LCP(L) 294	Royal Navy	The landing craft personnel (large) were lost sometime in August or September.
LP 1 Banderole	Kriegsmarine	The naval trawler/Vosportenboot was lost some time in September.
M 25	Kriegsmarine	World War II: The minesweeper was scuttled in Western France in September 1944.
M 4202 Joselle	Kriegsmarine	World War II: The Jacqueline-class trawler/minesweeper was scuttled off the coast of France some time in September.
M 4205 Goulfar II	Kriegsmarine	The naval trawler/minesweeper was lost some time in September.
M 4230 Korab III	Kriegsmarine	The naval trawler/minesweeper was lost some time in September.
Neptun	Kriegsmarine	The Type C Marinefahrprahm was sunk sometime in September.
Sperrbrecher 38 Porjus	Kriegsmarine	The Sperrbrecher was lost sometime in September.
Sperrbrecher 155 Tanger	Kriegsmarine	World War II: The Sperrbrecher was scuttled sometime in September while being converted to Sperrbrecher.
Sperrbrecher 187 Almeria	Kriegsmarine	World War II: The Sperrbrecher was scuttled sometime in September while being converted to Sperrbrecher.
Tiangxiang	Republic of China Navy	The Shi 34-class motor torpedo boat was lost sometime in September.
Tingbi	Republic of China Navy	The Shi 34-class motor torpedo boat was lost sometime in September.
U-703	Kriegsmarine	World War II: The Type VIIC submarine was lost on patrol in the Norwegian Sea on or after 16 September with the loss of all 54 crew. Cause unknown.
U-855	Kriegsmarine	World War II: The Type IXC/40 submarine was lost on patrol in the North Sea west of Bergen, Norway on or after 11 September with the loss of all 56 crew. Cause unknown.
U-865	Kriegsmarine	World War II: The Type IXC/40 submarine was lost on patrol in the Norwegian Sea on or after 9 September with the loss of all 56 crew. Cause unknown.
U-921	Kriegsmarine	World War II: The Type VIIC submarine was lost on patrol in the Arctic Ocean north west of Norway between 24 and 29 September with the loss of all 51 crew. Cause unknown.
VS 8	Kriegsmarine	The experimental VS 8 class hydrofoil transport went ashore from engine failure during testing. She broke in two during a salvage attempt.
Vukovar	Kriegsmarine	World War II: The auxiliary river minelayer was sunk sometime in September.
Wumu	Republic of China Navy	The Shi 34-class motor torpedo boat was lost sometime in September.
Xiguan	Republic of China Navy	The Shi 34-class motor torpedo boat was lost sometime in September.
