= T120 =

T120 may refer to one of the following:

- Triumph Bonneville T120 motorcycle
- T.120 telecommunications standard
- Soviet minesweeper T-120
- Mitsubishi Delica multipurpose vehicle also called T120 in some markets
