= WSSN =

WSSN may refer to:

- the maritime call sign of the ship SS George Ade
- the call sign of WBTQ, West Virginia, US from 1972 to 2002
- part of the call sign (WSSN-LD) of WILM-LD, North Carolina, US, from 1995 to 2000
