= P74 =

P74 may refer to:

- HMS Vigorous (P74), a submarine of the Royal Navy
- INS Andaman (P74), a corvette of the Indian Navy
- Papyrus 74, a biblical manuscript
- Percival P.74, a British experimental helicopter
- P74, a state regional road in Latvia
