= German submarine U-310 =

German World War II submarine

History

Nazi Germany
- Name: U-310
- Ordered: 5 June 1941
- Builder: Flender Werke, Lübeck
- Yard number: 310
- Laid down: 30 January 1942
- Launched: 3 January 1943
- Commissioned: 24 February 1943
- Fate: Surrendered on 9 May 1945, broken up in March 1947

General characteristics
- Class & type: Type VIIC submarine
- Displacement: 769 tonnes (757 long tons) surfaced; 871 t (857 long tons) submerged
- Length: 67.10 m (220 ft 2 in) o/a; 50.50 m (165 ft 8 in) pressure hull
- Beam: 6.20 m (20 ft 4 in) o/a; 4.70 m (15 ft 5 in) pressure hull
- Height: 9.60 m (31 ft 6 in)
- Draught: 4.74 m (15 ft 7 in)
- Installed power: 2,800–3,200 PS (2,100–2,400 kW; 2,800–3,200 bhp) (diesels); 750 PS (550 kW; 740 shp) (electric)
- Propulsion: 2 shafts; 2 × diesel engines; 2 × electric motors.
- Speed: 17.7 knots (32.8 km/h; 20.4 mph) surfaced; 7.6 knots (14.1 km/h; 8.7 mph) submerged
- Range: 8,500 nmi (15,700 km; 9,800 mi) at 10 knots (19 km/h; 12 mph) surfaced; 80 nmi (150 km; 92 mi) at 4 knots (7.4 km/h; 4.6 mph) submerged
- Test depth: 230 m (750 ft); Crush depth: 250–295 m (820–968 ft)
- Complement: 4 officers, 40–56 enlisted
- Armament: 5 × 53.3 cm (21 in) torpedo tubes (four bow, one stern); 14 × torpedoes or 26 TMA mines; 1 × 8.8 cm (3.46 in) deck gun (220 rounds); 2 × twin 2 cm (0.79 in) C/30 anti-aircraft guns

Service record
- Part of: 8th U-boat Flotilla; 24 February 1943 – 31 July 1944; 7th U-boat Flotilla; 1 August – 4 September 1944; 13th U-boat Flotilla; 5 September 1944 – 8 May 1945
- Identification codes: M 50 199
- Commanders: Oblt.z.S. Klaus Friedland; 24 February – 26 September 1943; Oblt.z.S. Wolfgang Ley; 27 September 1943 – 8 May 1945
- Operations: 6 patrols: 1st patrol: 13 – 21 September 1944; 2nd patrol: 25 September – 3 October 1944; 3rd patrol: 14 October – 11 November 1944; 4th patrol: 22 November – 14 December 1944; 5th patrol: 25 December 1944 – 5 January 1945; 6th patrol: a. 13 February – 30 March 1945; b. 3 – 7 April 1945
- Victories: 2 merchant ships sunk (14,395 GRT)

German submarine U-310 was a Type VIIC U-boat of Nazi Germany's Kriegsmarine during World War II. The submarine was laid down on 30 January 1942 at the Flender Werke yard at Lübeck as yard number 310, launched on 3 January 1943 and commissioned on 24 February under the command of Leutnant zur See Klaus Friedland.

During her career, the U-boat sailed on six combat patrols, sinking two ships, before she surrendered on 9 May 1945.

She was a member of seven wolfpacks.

== Design ==
German Type VIIC submarines were preceded by the shorter Type VIIB submarines. U-310 had a displacement of 769 tonnes (757 long tons) when at the surface and 871 tonnes (857 long tons) while submerged. She had a total length of 67.10 m (220 ft 2 in), a pressure hull length of 50.50 m (165 ft 8 in), a beam of 6.20 m (20 ft 4 in), a height of 9.60 m (31 ft 6 in), and a draught of 4.74 m (15 ft 7 in). The submarine was powered by two Germaniawerft F46 four-stroke, six-cylinder supercharged diesel engines producing a total of 2,800 to 3,200 metric horsepower (2,060 to 2,350 kW; 2,760 to 3,160 shp) for use while surfaced, two Garbe, Lahmeyer & Co. RP 137/c double-acting electric motors producing a total of 750 metric horsepower (550 kW; 740 shp) for use while submerged. She had two shafts and two 1.23 m (4 ft) propellers. The boat was capable of operating at depths of up to 230 metres (750 ft).

The submarine had a maximum surface speed of 17.7 knots (32.8 km/h; 20.4 mph) and a maximum submerged speed of 7.6 knots (14.1 km/h; 8.7 mph). When submerged, the boat could operate for 80 nautical miles (150 km; 92 mi) at 4 knots (7.4 km/h; 4.6 mph); when surfaced, she could travel 8,500 nautical miles (15,700 km; 9,800 mi) at 10 knots (19 km/h; 12 mph). U-310 was fitted with five 53.3 cm (21 in) torpedo tubes (four fitted at the bow and one at the stern), fourteen torpedoes, one 8.8 cm (3.46 in) SK C/35 naval gun, 220 rounds, and two twin 2 cm (0.79 in) C/30 anti-aircraft guns. The boat had a complement of between forty-four and sixty.

== Service history ==
The boat's service life began with training with the 8th U-boat Flotilla in February 1943. She was then transferred to the 7th flotilla for operations on 1 August. She was reassigned to the 13th flotilla on 5 September 1944.

The boat made two short journeys from Kiel in Germany to Marvika and Egersund in Norway, between June and August 1944.

=== First patrol ===
The submarine's first patrol began with her departure from Egersund (south of Stavanger), on 13 September 1944. She moved up the Norwegian coast, arriving in Narvik on the 21st.

=== Second patrol ===
The boat torpedoed the Edward H. Crockett on 29 September 1944. The wreck was finished off with gunfire from HMS Milne. She also sank the Samsuva in the same attack off the North Cape.

=== Third, fourth and fifth patrols ===
U-310's third sortie covered the Norwegian and Barents Seas.

In her fourth patrol, the U-boat rounded Bear Island and passed east of Murmansk.

Her fifth foray began in Harstad (northwest of Narvik), on 25 December 1944 and ended in Bogenbucht, (west of Narvik), on 5 January 1945.

=== Sixth patrol and fate ===
The U-boat's last patrol was relatively uneventful. She finished in Trondheim at war's end. There, she was broken up in March 1947.

== Summary of raiding history ==
| Date | Ship Name | Nationality | Tonnage (GRT) | Fate |
|---|---|---|---|---|
| 29 September 1944 | Edward H. Crockett | United States | 7,176 | Sunk |
| 29 September 1944 | Samsuva | United Kingdom | 7,219 | Sunk |

== Bibliography ==
- Busch, Rainer; Röll, Hans-Joachim (1999). German U-boat commanders of World War II : a biographical dictionary. Translated by Brooks, Geoffrey. London, Annapolis, Md: Greenhill Books, Naval Institute Press. ISBN 1-55750-186-6.
- Gröner, Erich; Jung, Dieter; Maass, Martin (1991). U-boats and Mine Warfare Vessels. German Warships 1815–1945. Vol. 2. Translated by Thomas, Keith; Magowan, Rachel. London: Conway Maritime Press. ISBN 0-85177-593-4.
