= German submarine U-482 =

German World War II submarine

History

Nazi Germany
- Name: U-482
- Ordered: 5 June 1941
- Builder: Deutsche Werke, Kiel
- Yard number: 317
- Laid down: 13 February 1942
- Launched: 25 September 1943
- Commissioned: 1 December 1943
- Fate: Sunk on 25 November 1944.

General characteristics
- Class & type: Type VIIC submarine
- Displacement: 769 tonnes (757 long tons) surfaced; 871 t (857 long tons) submerged
- Length: 67.23 m (220 ft 7 in) o/a; 50.50 m (165 ft 8 in) pressure hull
- Beam: 6.20 m (20 ft 4 in) o/a; 4.70 m (15 ft 5 in) pressure hull
- Height: 9.60 m (31 ft 6 in)
- Draught: 4.74 m (15 ft 7 in)
- Installed power: 2,800–3,200 PS (2,100–2,400 kW; 2,800–3,200 bhp) (diesels); 750 PS (550 kW; 740 shp) (electric)
- Propulsion: 2 shafts; 2 × diesel engines; 2 × electric motors.
- Speed: 17.7 knots (32.8 km/h; 20.4 mph) surfaced; 7.6 knots (14.1 km/h; 8.7 mph) submerged
- Range: 8,500 nmi (15,700 km; 9,800 mi) at 10 knots (19 km/h; 12 mph) surfaced; 80 nmi (150 km; 92 mi) at 4 knots (7.4 km/h; 4.6 mph) submerged
- Test depth: 230 m (750 ft); Crush depth: 250–295 m (820–968 ft)
- Complement: 4 officers, 40–56 enlisted
- Armament: 5 × 53.3 cm (21 in) torpedo tubes (four bow, one stern); 14 × torpedoes or 26 TMA mines; 1 × 3.7 cm (1.5 in) Flak M42 AA gun; 2 × twin 2 cm (0.79 in) C/30 anti-aircraft guns

Service record
- Part of: 5th U-boat Flotilla; 1 December 1943 – 31 July 1944; 9th U-boat Flotilla; 1 August – 30 September 1944; 11th U-boat Flotilla; 1 October – 25 November 1944
- Identification codes: M 54 717
- Commanders: Kptlt. Hartmut Graf von Matuschka, Freiherr von Toppolczan und Spaetgen; 1 December 1943 – 25 November 1944
- Operations: 2 patrols: 1st patrol: 16 August – 26 September 1944; 2nd patrol: 18 – 25 November 1944
- Victories: 4 merchant ships sunk (31,611 GRT); 1 warship sunk (1,010 tons)

German submarine U-482 was a Type VIIC U-boat of Nazi Germany's Kriegsmarine during World War II. She was laid down on 13 February 1942 at Deutsche Werke in Kiel as yard number 317 and went into service on 1 December 1943 under the command of Hartmut Graf von Matuschka, Freiherr von Toppolczan und Spaetgen.

U-482 began her service by training with the 5th U-boat Flotilla. She then transferred to the 9th, followed by the 11th flotillas.

== Design ==
German Type VIIC submarines were preceded by the shorter Type VIIB submarines. U-482 had a displacement of 769 tonnes (757 long tons) when at the surface and 871 tonnes (857 long tons) while submerged. She had a total length of 67.10 m (220 ft 2 in), a pressure hull length of 50.50 m (165 ft 8 in), a beam of 6.20 m (20 ft 4 in), a height of 9.60 m (31 ft 6 in), and a draught of 4.74 m (15 ft 7 in). The submarine was powered by two Germaniawerft F46 four-stroke, six-cylinder supercharged diesel engines producing a total of 2,800 to 3,200 metric horsepower (2,060 to 2,350 kW; 2,760 to 3,160 shp) for use while surfaced, two Siemens-Schuckert GU 343/38–8 double-acting electric motors producing a total of 750 metric horsepower (550 kW; 740 shp) for use while submerged. She had two shafts and two 1.23 m (4 ft) propellers. The boat was capable of operating at depths of up to 230 metres (750 ft).

The submarine had a maximum surface speed of 17.7 knots (32.8 km/h; 20.4 mph) and a maximum submerged speed of 7.6 knots (14.1 km/h; 8.7 mph). When submerged, the boat could operate for 80 nautical miles (150 km; 92 mi) at 4 knots (7.4 km/h; 4.6 mph); when surfaced, she could travel 8,500 nautical miles (15,700 km; 9,800 mi) at 10 knots (19 km/h; 12 mph). U-482 was fitted with five 53.3 cm (21 in) torpedo tubes (four fitted at the bow and one at the stern), fourteen torpedoes, one 3.7 cm (1.5 in) Flak M42 and two twin 2 cm (0.79 in) C/30 anti-aircraft guns. The boat had a complement of between forty-four and sixty.

== Service history ==
U-482 carried out two war patrols from Bergen in Norway, having sailed briefly to Horten Naval Base (also in Norway), both under Matuschka's command. The first, which began on 14 August 1944, took U-482 off the coast of Ireland. Over a nine-day period, she sank two freighters, the two tankers Jacksonville and Empire Heritage as well as the British corvette HMS Hurst Castle for a total of 31,611 gross register tons (GRT) and 1,010 tons. It was the single most successful war patrol by a Type VII U-boat in 1944.

U-482 mounted a second patrol beginning 18 November, but was sunk with all hands a week later by the British frigate HMS Ascension.

=== Fate ===
During the war it was thought that the U-482 was not sunk until 16 January 1945, and that she had damaged the escort carrier HMS Thane (later determined to be the work of U-1172). Credit for her sinking was given to the ships of British Support Group 22. In the 1990s the British Admiralty revised that assessment and declared that U-482 had possibly struck a mine in the North Channel, off Malin Head, in early December 1944. In 2005 U-boat researcher Axel Niestlé determined that U-482 was probably sunk by the British frigate HMS Ascension west of the Shetland Islands on 25 November 1944.

== Summary of raiding history ==
Between August and November 1944 U-482 sailed on two combat patrols, sinking four merchant ships totalling 31,611 GRT and 1,010 tons Castle-class corvette HMS Hurst Castle.

Ships attacked by U-482
Date	Ship Name	Nationality	Tonnage (Note: Merchant ship tonnages are in gross register tons. Military vessels are listed by tons displacement.)	Convoy	Fate and location
30 August 1944	Jacksonville	United States	10,448	CU-36	Sunk at 55°30′N 07°38′W
1 September 1944	HMS Hurst Castle	Royal Navy	1,010		Sunk at 55°27′N 08°12′W
3 September 1944	Fjordheim	Norway	4,115	ONF-251	Sunk at 55°55′N 09°28′W
8 September 1944	Empire Heritage	United Kingdom	15,702	HX 305	Sunk at 55°27′N 08°01′W
8 September 1944	Pinto	United Kingdom	1,346	HX 305	Sunk at 55°27′N 08°01′W

== Bibliography ==
- Busch, Rainer; Röll, Hans-Joachim (1999). German U-boat commanders of World War II : a biographical dictionary. Translated by Brooks, Geoffrey. London, Annapolis, Md: Greenhill Books, Naval Institute Press. ISBN 1-55750-186-6.
- Busch, Rainer; Röll, Hans-Joachim (1999). Deutsche U-Boot-Verluste von September 1939 bis Mai 1945 [German U-boat losses from September 1939 to May 1945]. Der U-Boot-Krieg (in German). Vol. IV. Hamburg, Berlin, Bonn: Mittler. ISBN 3-8132-0514-2.
- Gröner, Erich; Jung, Dieter; Maass, Martin (1991). U-boats and Mine Warfare Vessels. German Warships 1815–1945. Vol. 2. Translated by Thomas, Keith; Magowan, Rachel. London: Conway Maritime Press. ISBN 0-85177-593-4.
- Blair, Clay (2000). Hitler's U-Boat War: The Hunted 1942–1945. New York: Modern Library. ISBN 0-679-64033-9.
- John Petersen: Darkest Before Dawn: U-482 and the Sinking of Empire Heritage 1944. The History Press, 2011. ISBN 978-0752458830
