= HMS Stayner =

Frigate of the Royal Navy

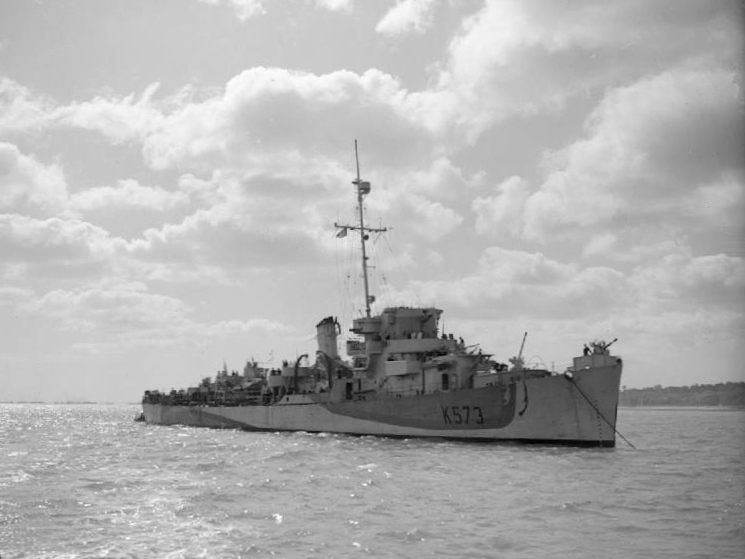
- HMS Stayner at anchor on 11 or 12 June 1944.

History

United States
- Builder: Bethlehem-Hingham Shipyard, Hingham, Massachusetts
- Laid down: 22 September 1943
- Launched: 6 November 1943
- Completed: 30 December 1943
- Identification: Hull number: DE-564
- Fate: Transferred to United Kingdom 30 December 1943
- Acquired: Returned by United Kingdom 24 November 1945
- Fate: Sold for scrapping 14 November 1947

United Kingdom
- Name: Stayner
- Namesake: Sir Richard Stayner
- Acquired: 30 December 1943
- Commissioned: 30 December 1943
- Decommissioned: 1945
- Identification: Pennant number: K573
- Fate: Returned to United States 24 November 1945

General characteristics
- Class & type: Captain-class frigate
- Displacement: 1,400 long tons (1,422 t)
- Length: 306 ft (93 m)
- Beam: 36.75 ft (11.2 m)
- Draught: 9 ft (2.7 m)
- Propulsion: Two Foster-Wheeler Express "D"-type water-tube boilers; GE 13,500 shp (10,070 kW) steam turbines and generators (9,200 kW); Electric motors for 12,000 shp (8,900 kW); Two shafts
- Speed: 24 knots (44 km/h)
- Range: 5,500 nautical miles (10,200 km) at 15 knots (28 km/h)
- Complement: 186
- Sensors & processing systems: SA & SL type radars; Type 144 series Asdic; MF Direction Finding antenna; HF Direction Finding Type FH 4 antenna
- Armament: 3 × 3 in (76 mm) /50 Mk.22 guns; 1 × twin Bofors 40 mm mount Mk.I; 7–16 × 20 mm Oerlikon guns; Mark 10 Hedgehog antisubmarine mortar; Depth charges; QF 2-pounder naval gun

HMS Stayner was a British Captain-class frigate of the Royal Navy in commission during World War II. Originally constructed as a United States Navy Buckley-class destroyer escort, she served in the Royal Navy from 1943 to 1945.

== Construction and transfer ==
The ship was laid down as the unnamed U.S. Navy destroyer escort DE-564 by Bethlehem-Hingham Shipyard, Inc., in Hingham, Massachusetts, on 22 September 1943 and launched on 6 November 1943. She was transferred to the United Kingdom upon completion on 30 December 1943.

== Service history ==
Commissioned into service in the Royal Navy as the frigate HMS Stayner (K573) on 30 December 1943 simultaneously with her transfer, the ship served on patrol and escort duty. On 5 August 1944, she joined the British destroyer HMS Wensleydale in a depth charge attack which sank the German submarine U-671 in the English Channel south of Brighton, England, at 0200 hours at position 50°23′00″N 000°06′00″E. On 19 September 1944 together with HMS MTB 724, and HMS MTB 728 she engaged Kriegsmarine E-boats, sinking S-183, S-200, and S-702.

The Royal Navy decommissioned Stayner later in 1945 and returned her to the U.S. Navy on 24 November 1945.

== Disposal ==
The United States sold Stayner on 14 November 1947 for scrapping.
