= Soviet minesweeper T-120 =

Minesweeper of the Soviet Navy

History

United States
- Name: USS Assail (AMc-123)
- Builder: Tampa Shipbuilding Company
- Reclassified: AM-147, 21 February 1942
- Laid down: 1 November 1942
- Launched: 27 December 1942
- Completed: 5 October 1943
- Fate: Transferred to the USSR, 5 October 1943
- Reclassified: MSF-147, 7 February 1955
- Stricken: 1 January 1983

Soviet Union
- Name: T-120
- Acquired: 5 October 1943
- Fate: Torpedoed and sunk, 24 September 1944

General characteristics
- Class & type: Admirable-class minesweeper
- Displacement: 650 tons
- Length: 184 ft 6 in (56.24 m)
- Beam: 33 ft (10 m)
- Draft: 9 ft 9 in (2.97 m)
- Propulsion: 2 × ALCO 539 diesel engines, 1,710 shp (1,280 kW); Farrel-Birmingham single reduction gear; 2 shafts
- Speed: 14.8 knots (27.4 km/h)
- Complement: 104
- Armament: 1 × 3-inch/50-caliber gun DP; 2 × twin Bofors 40 mm guns; 1 × Hedgehog anti-submarine mortar; 2 × Depth charge tracks

T-120 was a minesweeper of the Soviet Navy during World War II and the Cold War. She had originally been built as USS Assail (AM-147), an Admirable-class minesweeper, for the United States Navy during World War II, but never saw active service in the U.S. Navy. Upon completion she was transferred to the Soviet Union under Lend-Lease as T-120; she was never returned to the United States. T-120 was sunk by U-739 in the Kara Sea in September 1944. Because of the Cold War, the U.S. Navy was unaware of this fate and the vessel remained on the American Naval Vessel Register until she was struck on 1 January 1983.

== Career ==
Assail was laid down on 1 November 1942 at Tampa, Florida, by the Tampa Shipbuilding Co.; launched on 27 December 1942; sponsored by Miss M. T. Hicks; and completed on 5 October 1943. She was transferred to the Soviet Union on the day she was completed under the lend-lease program, and she served the Soviet Navy as T-120 until she was torpedoed and sunk 24 September 1944 in the Kara Sea by German submarine U-739.

Never returned, Assail was carried on the American Naval Vessel Register as MSF-147 after 7 February 1955 until struck on 1 January 1983.
