= German submarine U-739 =

German World War II submarine

History

Nazi Germany
- Name: U-739
- Ordered: 10 April 1941
- Builder: Schichau-Werke, Danzig
- Yard number: 1536
- Laid down: 17 April 1942
- Launched: 23 December 1942
- Commissioned: 6 March 1943
- Fate: Surrendered on 13 May 1945 at Emden. Sunk on 16 December 1945, in position 56°10′N 10°05′W in Operation Deadlight.

General characteristics
- Class & type: Type VIIC submarine
- Displacement: 769 tonnes (757 long tons) surfaced; 871 t (857 long tons) submerged
- Length: 67.10 m (220 ft 2 in) o/a; 50.50 m (165 ft 8 in) pressure hull
- Beam: 6.20 m (20 ft 4 in) o/a; 4.70 m (15 ft 5 in) pressure hull
- Draught: 4.74 m (15 ft 7 in)
- Installed power: 2,800–3,200 PS (2,100–2,400 kW; 2,800–3,200 bhp) (diesels); 750 PS (550 kW; 740 shp) (electric)
- Propulsion: 2 shafts; 2 × diesel engines; 2 × electric motors
- Speed: 17.7 knots (32.8 km/h; 20.4 mph) surfaced; 7.6 knots (14.1 km/h; 8.7 mph) submerged
- Range: 8,500 nmi (15,700 km; 9,800 mi) at 10 knots (19 km/h; 12 mph) surfaced; 80 nmi (150 km; 92 mi) at 4 knots (7.4 km/h; 4.6 mph) submerged
- Test depth: 230 m (750 ft); Crush depth: 250–295 m (820–968 ft)
- Complement: 4 officers, 40–56 enlisted
- Armament: 5 × 53.3 cm (21 in) torpedo tubes (4 bow, 1 stern); 14 × torpedoes; 1 × 8.8 cm (3.46 in) deck gun (220 rounds); 2 × twin 2 cm (0.79 in) C/30 anti-aircraft guns

Service record
- Part of: 8th U-boat Flotilla; 6 March – 31 October 1943; 9th U-boat Flotilla; 1 November – 31 December 1943; 13th U-boat Flotilla; 1 January 1944 – 8 May 1945
- Identification codes: M 50 545
- Commanders: Lt.z.S. / Oblt.z.S. Ernst Mangold; 6 March 1943 – 25 February 1945; Oblt.z.S. Fritz Kosnick; 26 February – 13 May 1945; Oblt.z.S. Johannes Ney (acting); 26 February – March 1945
- Operations: 8 patrols: 1st patrol: 8 January – 3 February 1944; 2nd patrol: a. 21 February – 8 March 1944; b. 27 – 29 March 1944; 3rd patrol: 30 March – 13 April 1944; 4th patrol: a. 16 April – 9 May 1944; b. 11 – 13 May 1944; c. 30 June – 1 July 1944; d. 7 – 12 July 1944; 5th patrol: a. 2 August – 3 October 1944; b. 6 – 8 October 1944; c. 15 – 18 December 1944; 6th patrol: 7 – 10 January 1945; 7th patrol: 16 January – 25 February 1945; 8th patrol: 1 April – 13 May 1945
- Victories: 1 warship sunk (625 tons)

German submarine U-739 was a Type VIIC U-boat built for Nazi Germany's Kriegsmarine for service during World War II. She was laid down on 17 April 1942 by Schichau-Werke, Danzig as yard number 1536, launched on 23 December 1942 and commissioned on 6 March 1943 under Leutnant zur See Ernst Mangold.

== Design ==
German Type VIIC submarines were preceded by the shorter Type VIIB submarines. U-739 had a displacement of 769 tonnes (757 long tons) when at the surface and 871 tonnes (857 long tons) while submerged. She had a total length of 67.10 m (220 ft 2 in), a pressure hull length of 50.50 m (165 ft 8 in), a beam of 6.20 m (20 ft 4 in), a height of 9.60 m (31 ft 6 in), and a draught of 4.74 m (15 ft 7 in). The submarine was powered by two Germaniawerft F46 four-stroke, six-cylinder supercharged diesel engines producing a total of 2,800 to 3,200 metric horsepower (2,060 to 2,350 kW; 2,760 to 3,160 shp) for use while surfaced, two AEG GU 460/8–27 double-acting electric motors producing a total of 750 metric horsepower (550 kW; 740 shp) for use while submerged. She had two shafts and two 1.23 m (4 ft) propellers. The boat was capable of operating at depths of up to 230 metres (750 ft).

The submarine had a maximum surface speed of 17.7 knots (32.8 km/h; 20.4 mph) and a maximum submerged speed of 7.6 knots (14.1 km/h; 8.7 mph). When submerged, the boat could operate for 80 nautical miles (150 km; 92 mi) at 4 knots (7.4 km/h; 4.6 mph); when surfaced, she could travel 8,500 nautical miles (15,700 km; 9,800 mi) at 10 knots (19 km/h; 12 mph). U-739 was fitted with five 53.3 cm (21 in) torpedo tubes (four fitted at the bow and one at the stern), fourteen torpedoes, one 8.8 cm (3.46 in) SK C/35 naval gun, 220 rounds, and two twin 2 cm (0.79 in) C/30 anti-aircraft guns. The boat had a complement of between forty-four and sixty.

== Service history ==
The boat's career began with training at 8th U-boat Flotilla on 6 March 1943, followed by active service on 1 November 1943 as part of the 9th Flotilla. Just two months later she transferred to 13th Flotilla for the remainder of her service.

In eight patrols she sank one warship for a total of 625 tons.

=== Wolfpacks ===
U-739 took part in eight wolfpacks, namely:

- Isegrim (16 – 27 January 1944)
- Werwolf (27 January – 2 February 1944)
- Boreas (28 February – 5 March 1944)
- Keil (16 – 20 April 1944)
- Donner & Keil (20 April – 3 May 1944)
- Trutz (7 – 10 July 1944)
- Greif (5 August – 26 September 1944)
- Rasmus (6 – 13 February 1945)

=== Fate ===
U-739 surrendered on 13 May 1945 at Emden. Sunk later on 16 December 1945, in position 56°10′N 10°05′W in Operation Deadlight.

== Summary of raiding history ==
Date	Ship Name	Nationality	Tonnage (Note: Merchant ship tonnages are in gross register tons. Military vessels are listed by tons displacement.)	Fate
24 September 1944	T-120	Soviet Navy	625	Sunk

== Bibliography ==
- Busch, Rainer; Röll, Hans-Joachim (1999). German U-boat commanders of World War II : a biographical dictionary. Translated by Brooks, Geoffrey. London, Annapolis, Md: Greenhill Books, Naval Institute Press. ISBN 1-55750-186-6.
- Busch, Rainer; Röll, Hans-Joachim (1999). Der U-Boot-Krieg, 1939-1945: Deutsche U-Boot-Verluste von September 1939 bis Mai 1945 [German U-boat losses from September 1939 to May 1945] (in German). Vol. IV. Hamburg, Berlin, Bonn: Mittler. ISBN 3-8132-0514-2.
- Gröner, Eric; Jung, Dieter; Maass, Martin (1991). German Warships 1815-1945: U-boats and Mine Warfare Vessels. Vol. 2. Translated by Thomas, Keith; Magowan, Rachel. London: Conway Maritime Press. ISBN 0-85177-593-4.
- Sharpe, Peter (1998). U-Boat Fact File. Great Britain: Midland Publishing. ISBN 1-85780-072-9.
