= HMS Vigorous =

Submarine of the Royal Navy

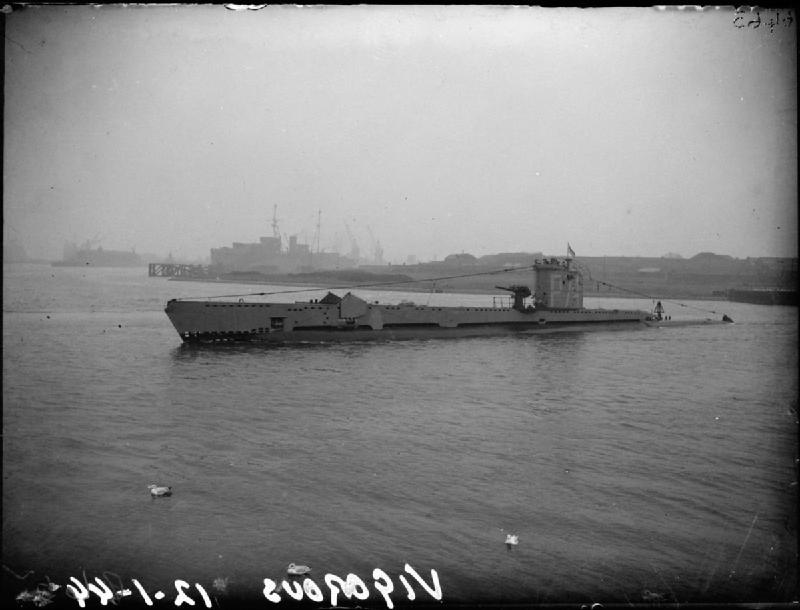
- HMS Vigorous in 1944

History

United Kingdom
- Name: HMS Vigorous
- Builder: Vickers Armstrong, Barrow-in-Furness
- Laid down: 14 December 1942
- Launched: 15 October 1943
- Commissioned: 13 January 1944
- Identification: Pennant number P74
- Fate: Scrapped at Stockton-on-Tees, 23 December 1949

General characteristics
- Class & type: V-class submarine
- Displacement: 545 tons (standard - surfaced); 658 tons (full load - surfaced); 740 tons (submerged)
- Length: 204 ft 6 in (62.33 m)
- Beam: 16 ft 1 in (4.90 m)
- Draught: 15 ft 3 in (4.65 m)
- Propulsion: 2 shaft diesel-electric; 2 Paxman Ricardo diesel generators + electric motors; 615 hp (459 kW) / 825 hp (615 kW)
- Speed: 11.25 knots (20.84 km/h) surfaced; 10 knots (19 km/h) submerged
- Complement: 33
- Armament: 4 × bow internal 21 inch (533 mm) torpedo tubes; 8-10 torpedoes; 1 × 3-inch (76 mm) deck gun

HMS Vigorous was a V-class submarine of the Royal Navy (RN) with the pennant number P74.

The boat was laid down by Vickers-Armstrong at Barrow-in-Furness on 14 December 1942. She was launched on 15 October 1943, and commissioned into the RN on 13 January 1944. The submarine operated during the late stages of World War II. On 26 September 1944, HMS Vigorous torpedoed and sank the German merchant Salomea (751 BRT, former Greek Evangelos Nomikos) off Kassandra, Greece. The submarine was decommissioned after the war and was broken up for scrap at Stockton-on-Tees on 23 December 1949.
