= SS George Ade =

World War II Liberty ship of the United States

History

United States
- Name: George Ade
- Namesake: George Ade
- Owner: War Shipping Administration (WSA)
- Operator: American West African Line Inc.
- Ordered: as type (EC2-S-C1) hull, MC hull 2314
- Builder: J.A. Jones Construction, Panama City, Florida
- Cost: $1,024,537
- Yard number: 55
- Way number: 4
- Laid down: 30 June 1944
- Launched: 9 August 1944
- Completed: 25 August 1944
- Identification: Call sign: WSSN
- Fate: Laid up in the National Defense Reserve Fleet, in Mobile, Mobile, 9 October 1947; Sold for scrapping, 21 February 1967, withdrawn from fleet, 8 March 1967

General characteristics
- Class & type: Liberty ship; type EC2-S-C1, standard
- Tonnage: 10,865 LT DWT; 7,176 GRT
- Displacement: 3,380 long tons (3,434 t) (light); 14,245 long tons (14,474 t) (max)
- Length: 441 feet 6 inches (135 m) oa; 416 feet (127 m) pp; 427 feet (130 m) lwl
- Beam: 57 feet (17 m)
- Draft: 27 ft 9.25 in (8.4646 m)
- Installed power: 2 × Oil fired 450 °F (232 °C) boilers, operating at 220 psi (1,500 kPa); 2,500 hp (1,900 kW)
- Propulsion: 1 × triple-expansion steam engine, (manufactured by General Machinery Corp., Hamilton, Ohio); 1 × screw propeller
- Speed: 11.5 knots (21.3 km/h; 13.2 mph)
- Capacity: 562,608 cubic feet (15,931 m^{3}) (grain); 499,573 cubic feet (14,146 m^{3}) (bale)
- Complement: 38–62 USMM; 21–40 USNAG
- Armament: Varied by ship; Bow-mounted 3-inch (76 mm)/50-caliber gun; Stern-mounted 4-inch (102 mm)/50-caliber gun; 2–8 × single 20-millimeter (0.79 in) Oerlikon anti-aircraft (AA) cannons and/or, 2–8 × 37-millimeter (1.46 in) M1 AA guns

SS George Ade was a Liberty ship built in the United States during World War II. She was named after Indiana writer, newspaper columnist, playwright, and namesake for Purdue University's Ross–Ade Stadium, George Ade.

== Construction ==
George Ade was laid down on 30 June 1944, under a Maritime Commission (MARCOM) contract, MC hull 2314, by J.A. Jones Construction, Panama City, Florida; and launched on 9 August 1944.

== History ==
She was allocated to American West African Line Inc., 18 August 1944. She successfully completed her seatrials on 20 August 1944.

While in transit from Key West, Florida, to New York City, she was torpedoed on 12 September 1944, off the coast of North Carolina, by German submarine U-518. Her rudder was damaged but she stayed afloat. USCGC Jackson and USCGC Bedloe, heading to assist the crew of George Ade, were caught in the Great Atlantic Hurricane of 1944 the day after, sinking both cutters and killing 47 Coast Guardsmen. (Note: The Coast Guard's official 1947 history, Lost Cutters, reports a combined total of 47 deaths on the two cutters. However, Silverstein (2006) reports 48 deaths.) A U.S. Navy seaplane rescued the survivors.

After repairs she was allocated to the Parry Navigation Co., Inc. on 18 July 1946, and again on 17 November 1946. On 17 September 1947, she was allocated to the South Atlantic Steamship Line, for transfer to the National Defense Reserve Fleet, in Mobile, Alabama. She was sold, On 21 February 1967, for $48,259 to Union Minerals and Alloys Corporation, to be scrapped. She was withdrawn from the fleet on 8 March 1967.

== Bibliography ==
- "Jones Construction, Panama City FL". ShipbuildingHistory.com. 13 October 2010.
- Maritime Administration. "George Ade". Ship History Database Vessel Status Card. U.S. Department of Transportation, Maritime Administration. This article incorporates text from this source, which is in the public domain.
- Davies, James (May 2004). "Specifications (As-Built)" (PDF). p. 23.
- "SS George Ade".
- Lost Cutters (PDF). Coast Guard at War. Vol. 8. Washington DC: U.S. Coast Guard. 1 July 1947. pp. 15–17. OCLC 31957796. "The BEDLOE had 5 officers and 33 men on board when sunk, of whom 2 officers and 24 men were lost. The JACKSON had 5 officers and 36 men on board and 2 officers and 19 men were lost."
- Silverstein, PA2 Judy (2006). "Adrift: A CGC Jackson survivor recounts his harrowing survival at sea" (PDF). Coast Guard. No. 2. pp. 28–31. Archived from the original (PDF) on 13 May 2006.
