= Arthur W. Wermuth =

United States Army officer

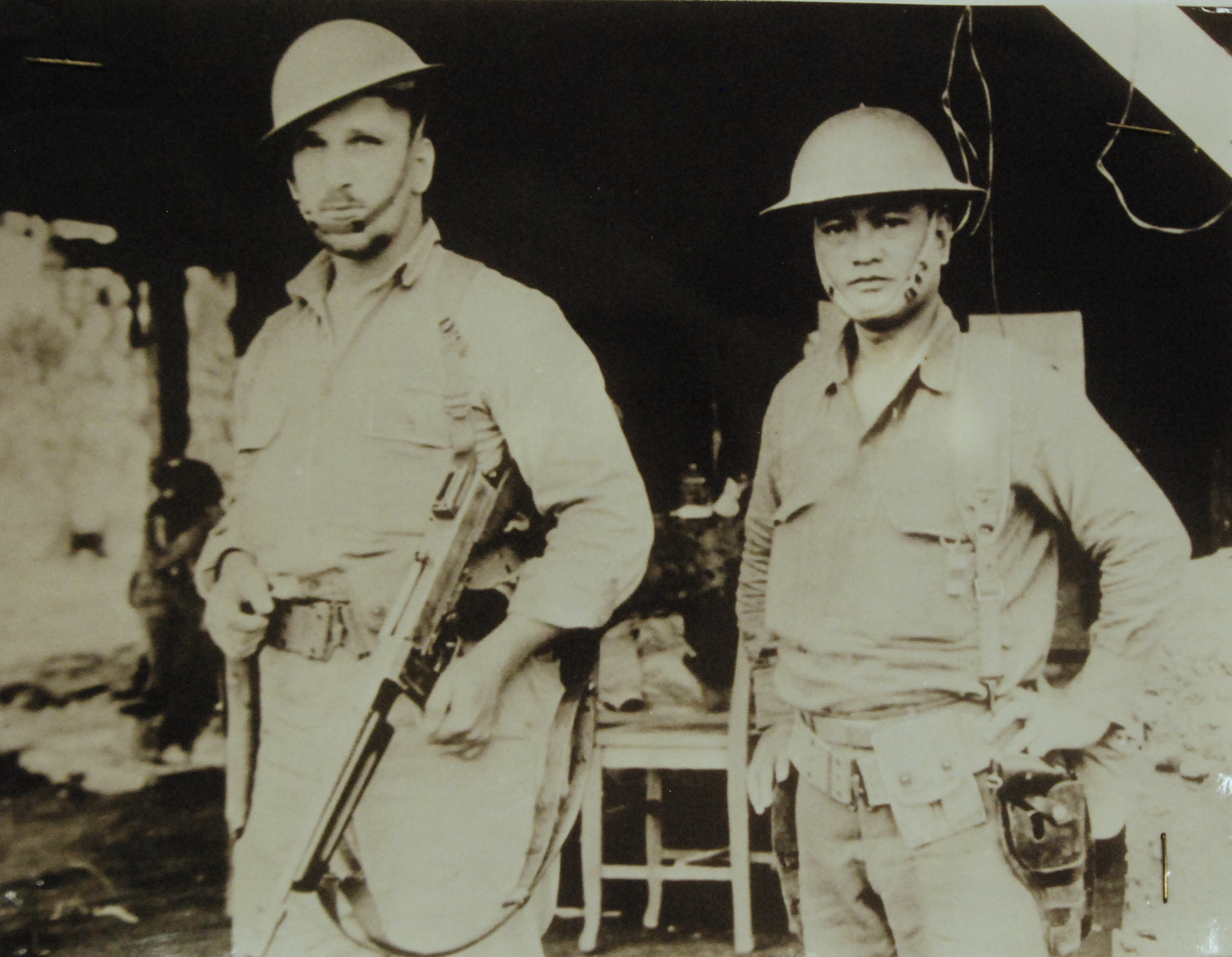
- CAPT Arthur W. Wermuth (left) with Filipino aide
- Born: May 3, 1915; South Dakota
- Died: June 13, 1981 (aged 66); Grants Pass, Oregon
- Military career
- Allegiance: United States of America
- Branch: United States Army
- Service years: 1936–1948
- Rank: Major
- Nickname: "One-Man Army of Bataan"
- Unit: 57th Infantry Regiment of the Philippine Scouts
- Conflicts: World War II: Battle of Bataan
- Awards: Distinguished Service Cross; Silver Star; Purple Heart (at least 4 awards)

Arthur William Wermuth Jr. (May 3, 1915 – June 13, 1981), dubbed the "One-Man Army of Bataan", was a United States Army officer during World War II and a prisoner of war from April 1942 until August 1945.

== Background ==
Wermuth was born in South Dakota, but raised in Chicago's Lakeview neighborhood at 3631 N. Janssen Avenue. His hometown during World War II was listed as Traverse City, Michigan. His father was a doctor and World War I veteran who died in 1937 and his mother was Clara Natalie Lorenz. His sister, Natalie, was a professional dancer in the Chicago in the 1940s using the stage name Talia.

Wermuth graduated from Northwestern Military and Naval Academy, a military boarding school, in 1932. He was an athletic youth and participated in many sports at the academy, including crew, football, track, and baseball. His teammates nicknamed him "Satch." He played guard and tackle in football and was an outfielder with a .299 batting average in baseball. In track and field he participated in shot put and discus. The student Log Book described him saying, "Defensively, he was a hard man to get through. Offensively, many gains were made through holes he opened."

He spent two years each at North Park Junior College and Northwestern University, also studying at the Loyola University School of Medicine, He received his Bachelor of Science degree in bacteriology in 1936. Deciding he did not want to be a doctor, Wermuth and his first wife Jean Wilkins, whom he met in 1935 while shadowing his father at the Ravenswood Hospital, relocated to Traverse City, Michigan, where he took a job as a drug salesman.

== World War II ==
Wermuth received his commission as a second lieutenant in the infantry through the Reserve Officers' Training Corps in 1936 while he was a junior at Northwestern. While stationed at a Civilian Conservation Corps camp near Watersmeet, Michigan, he learned wilderness survival skills. He entered active duty in January 1941 at Fort Brady, Sault Ste. Marie, Michigan, where he remained until April. He was promoted to captain on December 19, 1941, after the invasion of the Philippines and was one of a handful of Americans in the primarily Filipino 57th Infantry Regiment of the Philippine Scouts. On January 5, 1942, Wermuth organized a group of 185 Filipinos into a group that became known as "suicide snipers" to counter enemy infiltration behind American lines and as a counter-sniper force. Over the next three weeks he and his force claimed over 500 enemy killed while losing 45 of its own. He was shot in the leg in January while on a successful mission to destroy a bridge and burn an enemy encampment. On February 3, he was shot in the left breast and was carried back to receive treatment. On February 15, he left the medical facility without permission and rejoined his battalion. In early April he fell down a ravine and was seriously injured on a large boulder. He awakened in Field Hospital Number 2 as it was being overrun by Japanese forces.

Wermuth received the Distinguished Service Cross for his actions in January 1942 in the Philippines. He became known as the "one-man army of Bataan" and was widely credited with over 116 kills. He also received the Silver Star and three Purple Heart decorations.

=== Captivity ===
Wermuth's injuries forced him to remain in a Japanese hospital until May 25, 1942, when he was transported to New Bilibid Prison. His injuries spared him from the Bataan Death March. After Bilibid, he was transported via boxcar to a camp near Cabanatuan. In September, he was sent to Lipa City, Batangas and placed in charge of a 500-man work detail to construct a runway. During the construction, his crew deliberately sabotaged the runway so that it buckled under the weight of landing bombers. His injuries forced him to be sent back to Bilibid in January 1943, where he was operated on in April 1943 by an American surgeon who was also in captivity. In June, he was sent back to Cabanatuan to join a farming detail. In January 1944 his detail was being worked to the point where men were collapsing in the manure. When he demanded that the Japanese commander take it easy on his men, he received a severe beating, damaging his kidneys and sending him back to a hospital.

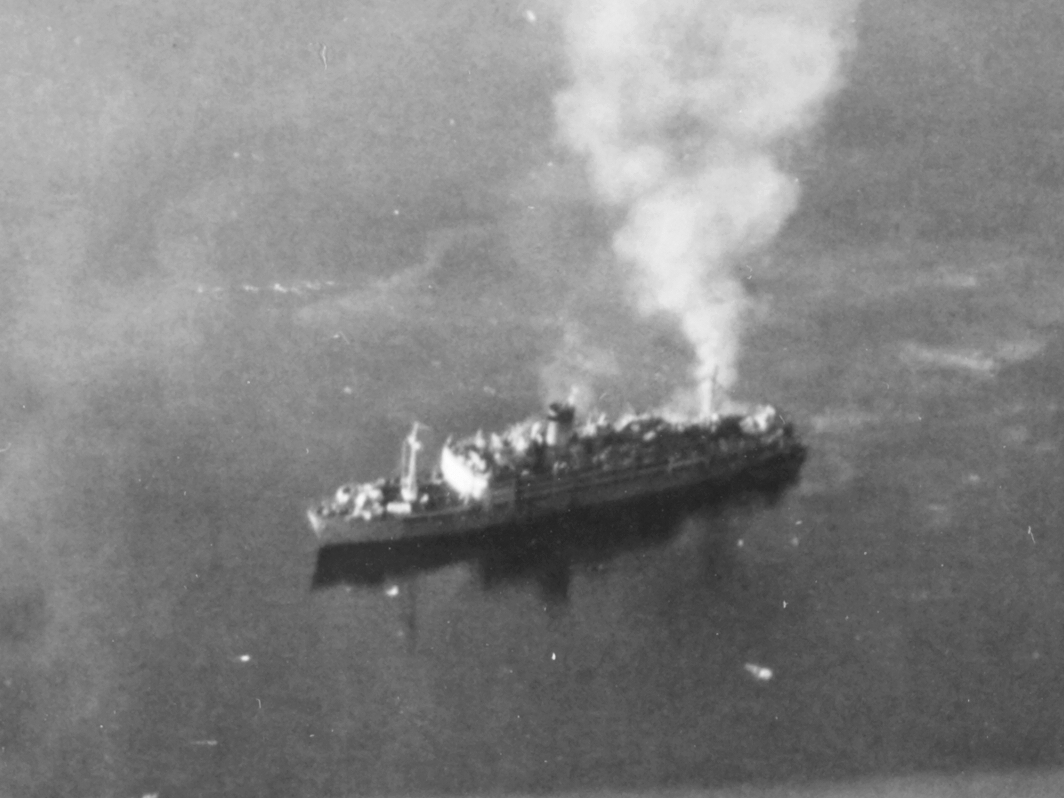
The Oryoku Maru under attack at Olongapo, Luzon, December 14–15, 1944

On October 13, 1944, he was transferred back to Bilibid until December, when he boarded the "hell ship" Oryoku Maru as one of 1620 prisoners. Because the prison ship was unmarked, it was bombed December 15, 1944, at Olongapo in Subic Bay by aircraft from USS Hornet who mistook it for a troop transport, killing several hundred POWs. Wermuth survived the bombing and was transported by boxcar to San Fernando. 160 men were placed in his car and as there was no room to move or sit, were forced to stand for the duration of the 26-hour trip. According to Wermuth, the man beside him died on his feet and was held in place by the crowd for the rest of the trip since there was no room to remove the corpse. In January 1945, he was transported to Formosa aboard the Enoura Maru. Wermuth received his fourth Purple Heart due to the injuries sustained when bombers from the USS Hornet attacked Enoura Maru. Next he was transported to Japan, then to Pusan, Korea, then to Mukden, where his prison camp was liberated by the Russians in August 1945. When he was found, he weighed 105 pounds (48 kg), having weighed 190 pounds (86 kg) earlier in the war. Wermuth returned to the United States on the transport SS Marine Shark, arriving November 1, 1945, in San Francisco. On his return, he modestly credited the Filipino scouts for many of his exploits saying, "Ninety percent of the credit for what I did was due to them. They're the best soldiers in the world. I just happened to be in the right place at the right time."

== Post war ==
Shortly after the war ended, Olivia Josephine Oswald, a Filipino nurse, claimed to have married Wermuth December 7, 1941, on the rooftop of the Great Eastern hotel in Manila, though this was disputed by Wermuth. His divorce to Jean was finalized June 4, 1947, and the same day he married Patricia Steele, a 23-year-old parachutist from Denver, Colorado. He and Patricia adopted an 8 year old named David about 1956.

In 1948, Wermuth was elected Marshal of City Court in Wichita, Kansas. and subsequently arrested L. Ron Hubbard in 1951. He was appointed sheriff of Jefferson County, Colorado, by county commissioners in 1957 following the indictment and resignation of Sheriff Enlow for federal income tax evasion. Wermuth resigned as sheriff on May 1, 1962, in lieu of prosecution on an embezzlement charge and was replaced by Harold E. Bray. As sheriff of Jefferson County, Colorado, Wermuth led searches for and investigated the disappearance of Coors Brewing Company CEO and heir Adolph Coors III within his county.
