= Reginald H. Ridgely Jr. =

United States Marine Corps general (1902–1979)

Reginald Heber Ridgely Jr.
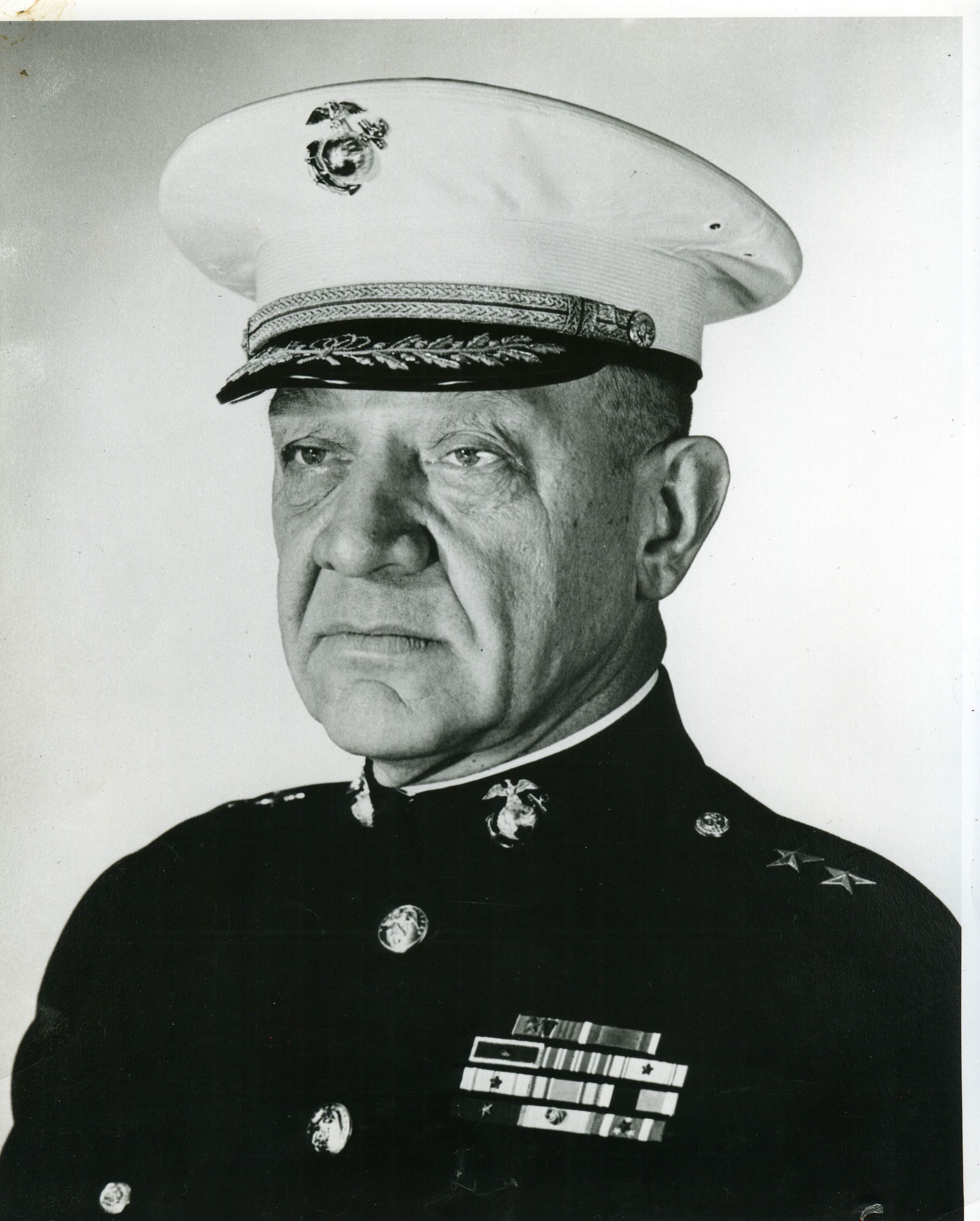
- Nickname: "Bo"
- Born: August 18, 1902; Lexington, Virginia, US
- Died: June 28, 1979 (aged 76) Kilmarnock, Virginia, US
- Buried: Arlington National Cemetery
- Allegiance: United States of America
- Branch: United States Marine Corps
- Service years: 1923–1959
- Rank: Lieutenant General
- Commands: 8th Marine Regiment; 2nd Marine Division
- Conflicts: Banana Wars: Occupation of Haiti; Occupation of Nicaragua; World War II: Philippines campaign (1941–1942); Battle of Bataan; Battle of Corregidor; Philippines campaign (1944–1945)
- Awards: Bronze Star w/ Combat "V" (2); Purple Heart; Prisoner of War Medal

Reginald Heber Ridgely Jr. (August 18, 1902 – June 28, 1979) was a United States Marine Corps lieutenant general. He was taken as a prisoner of war by the Japanese during World War II and was one of the few survivors of the infamous "hell ships."

== Early life and career ==
Reginald H. Ridgely was born on August 18, 1902, in Lexington, Virginia. He was raised in Annapolis, Maryland, and attended St. John's College, where his father was a professor.

Upon graduating in 1923, Ridgely was commissioned as a second lieutenant in the Marine Corps. He took part in the occupations of Haiti and Nicaragua during the Banana Wars. He also spent time overseas in the Mediterranean before he was attached to the 4th Marine Regiment in Shanghai, China, in June 1941. In November of that year, the regiment relocated to the Philippines.

== World War II ==
Just a few weeks after the move, the Japanese attacked Pearl Harbor and invaded the Philippines. Major Ridgely fought with his Marines during the battle of Bataan before evacuating to the island of Corregidor. However they were forced to surrender during the battle of Corregidor on May 6, 1942.

The prisoners were held on Corregidor for the next several weeks, where they were placed on a starvation diet. They also were required to bow to any Japanese soldier they crossed paths with, and would be beaten for various reasons, sometimes for no apparent reason at all. On May 24, the prisoners were loaded onto landing barges and transported to Manila, where they were forced to march in a Japanese "Victory Parade" through the city. Major Ridgely and his fellow prisoners were tightly packed into cattle cars and shipped to a prisoner of war camp at Cabanatuan, where he stayed for the next two years.

Ridgely and 1,600 other prisoners of war were sent by hellships to Japan in December 1944, while the United States was fighting to retake the Philippines. The first ship Ridgely was traveling in, Ōryoku Maru, was sunk just two days after departing Manila Bay by American aircraft. 200 prisoners were killed as Ridgely assumed leadership over the survivors. The prisoners were transferred to a second ship, Enoura Maru, which managed to reach Formosa on New Year's Day 1945. About one week later, that ship was bombed as well and left dead in the water, killing another 300 prisoners.

A third ship, Brazil Maru, delivered Major Ridgely and the surviving prisoners to Japan by the end of January. Ridgely would eventually be taken to Korea, where he spent the rest of the war at a camp in Keijō. He was released just after the Japanese surrender. Only 400 of the original 1,600 prisoners of war loaded on the hellships survived the war.

== Post-war career ==
Following the war, Ridgely served as the commanding officer of the 8th Marine Regiment & Fleet Force in the Mediterranean from 1947 to 1948. Later, from 1948 to January 1951, he was the commanding officer of the Naval disciplinary barracks at Portsmouth, New Hampshire. He then served as the commanding general of MCRD San Diego from 1951 to 1952.

In 1952, Ridgely then became director of Marine Corps personnel at headquarters of the U.S.M.C in Washington, D.C. From July 1955 to June 1957, Major General Ridgely was the commanding general of the 2nd Marine Division. Afterwards, he took over as the commanding general of Camp Pendleton, filling this position until his retirement as a lieutenant general on November 1, 1959.

Reginald H. Ridgely died of cardiac arrest on June 28, 1979, in a nursing home in Kilmarnock, Virginia. He was buried in Arlington National Cemetery.

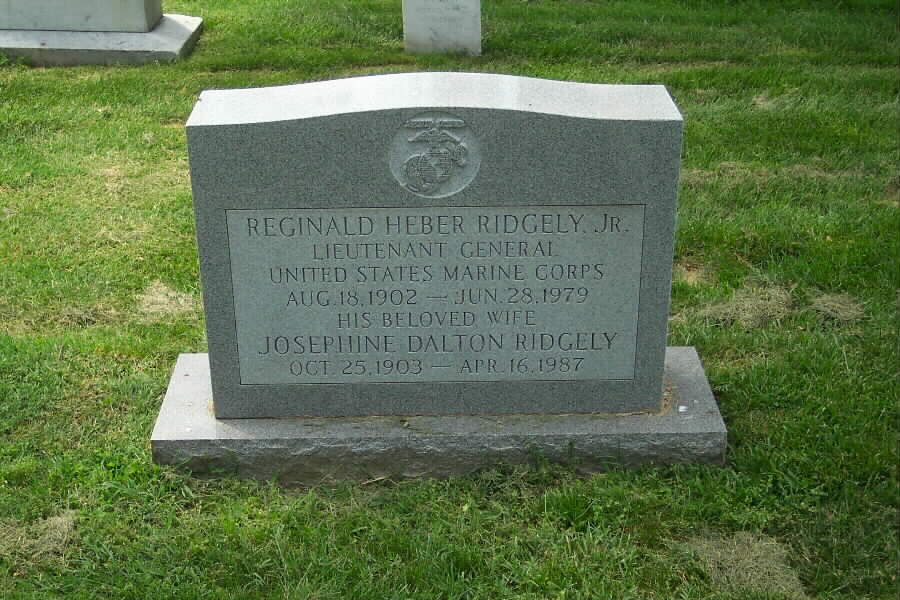
Tombstone for Reginald Heber Ridgely Jr and his wife, Josephine Dalton Ridgely. Located in Section 11 of Arlington National Cemetery.

== Decorations and awards ==
Reginald H. Ridgely's military awards include:

1st row	Bronze Star with 1 star & Combat "V"		Purple Heart
2nd row	Presidential Unit Citation with oak leaf cluster	Prisoner of War Medal	Second Nicaraguan Campaign Medal
3rd row	American Defense Service; Medal with Base clasp	Asiatic-Pacific Campaign Medal with 1 stars	World War II; Victory Medal
4th row	Navy Occupation Service Medal	National Defense; Service Medal	Nicaraguan Presidential; Medal of Merit with Diploma
5th row	National Order of Honour and Merit with Rank of Officer & Diploma	Philippine Republic Presidential Unit Citation	Philippine Defense Medal with Bronze Star

== See also ==
- List of 2nd Marine Division commanders

Military offices
Preceded by Edward W. Snedeker	Commanding General of the 2nd Marine Division; July 2, 1955 – June 2, 1957	Succeeded by Joseph C. Burger
Preceded by George F. Good Jr.	Commanding General of Camp Pendleton; July 1957 – November 1959	Succeeded by Alan Shapley
