= Joseph Verbis Lafleur =

American Catholic Priest, POW, and World War II U.S. Army Chaplain}, Decorated WW II Hero

Servant of God Joseph Verbis Lafleur
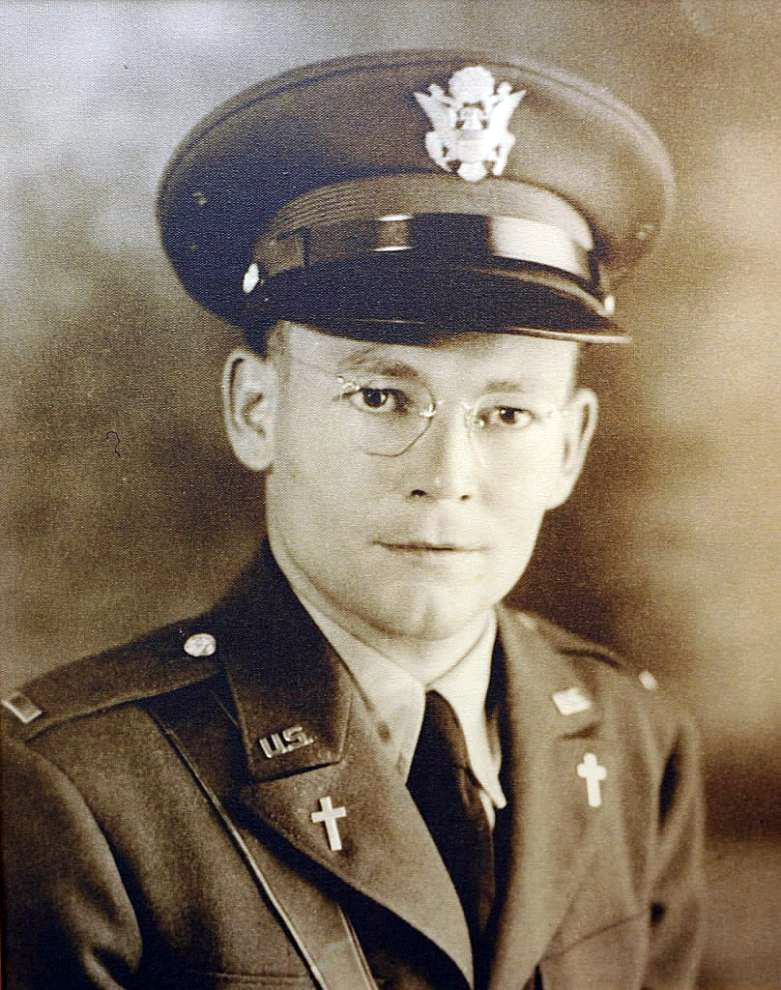
- Lafleuer in 1941
- Born: Joseph Verbis Lafleur; 24 January, 1912
- Died: 7 September, 1944 (aged 32) off Sindangan, Zamboanga del Norte, Philippines, Sulu Sea
- Cause of death: Shinyo Maru Incident

Joseph Verbis Lafleur (January 24, 1912 – September 7, 1944) was a Roman Catholic priest of the Military Ordinariate of the United States who died in the sinking of the SS Shinyo Maru. A beatification process for him was opened in the Diocese of Lafayette in 2020, titling Lafleur a Servant of God.

== Early life ==
Joseph Lafleur was born on January 24, 1912 in Ville Platte, Louisiana. He was one of seven children. His father abandoned his family and left his mother to raise their seven children. The mother took odd jobs and grew a garden to feed the impoverished family. The children attended Mount Carmel Academy in Villa Platte. When LaFleur reached age 14 around 1926, the family moved into the household of his married sister Olivia in Opelousas, Louisiana.

While attending St. Landry Church in Opelousas, the teenage Lafleur told the pastor that he wanted to enter the priesthood. The priest arranged for him to enter the St. Joseph College Seminary in St. Benedict, Louisiana. After finishing at St. Joseph, LeFleur entered the Notre Dame Seminary in New Orleans, Louisiana. The seminarians there called him Frenchy due to his Cajun ancestry.

LeFleur was ordained a priest for the Archdiocese of New Orleans in 1938 and was assigned as an assistant pastor at St. Mary Magdalene Parish in Abbeville, Louisiana. A baseball coach at the parish school, he pawned his watch so as to buy equipment for his team.

== Military service ==
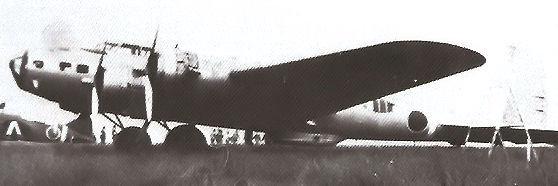
Clark Field after Japanese capture

=== Assignment to Philippines ===
In the summer of 1941, the Army issued an appeal for military chaplains for the growing Army Air Corps. With permission from his bishop, LaFleur enlisted in the US Army Chaplain Corps and was sent to Albuquerque, New Mexico, for training. He was sent to Clark Field in the Philippines in the fall of 1941 to serve with the 19th Bombardment Group.

On December 8, 1941, only a few hours after the December 7th Japanese attack on Pearl Harbor in Hawaii, Japanese bombers targeted Clark Field. Dozens of Army aircraft were destroyed in the attack. As it was going on, LeFleur was aiding the wounded and giving absolution to the dying. The Army evacuated Clark Field on December 24th and started sending personnel down to the southern islands of the Philippines. They commandeered the SS Mayon (also called Mayton), an inter-island ferry, to bring troops, including LeFleur, to Mindanao.

During the voyage, the Mayon was bombed by Japanese planes off Mindanao. At one point, three men were thrown overboard during the attack. LeFleur rescued them, then helped everyone load into lifeboats. When told to get in a boat, he replied “I shall stay here. My place is with the men.”LeFleur was reportedly the last man aboard the stricken ship.

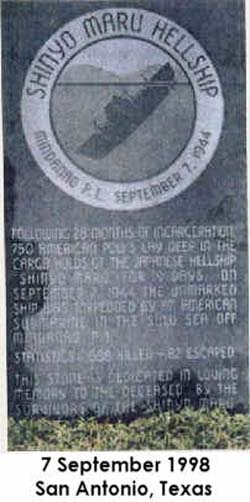
Shinyo Maru memorial plaque

=== Capture by Japanese ===
With the surrender of the American fortress of Corregidor in Manilla Bay in early May 1942, the conventional military resistance to the Japanese in the Philippines end. Along with thousands of other American servicemen and women, LeFleur became a prisoner of war (POW). He spent the next two and a half years in four POW camps.

During this time, LeFleur gave his food and malaria pills to other POWs, traded his valuables for food for the hungry and took tough work assignments to let others rest. LeFleur would frequently sneak into the infirmaries to visit the sick, receiving brutal beatings from guards for breaking this rule. He constructed a makeshift chapel in one camp, where he held services. His faith and example reportedly convinced 200 fellow POWs to convert to Catholicism.

=== Death ===
In September 1944, the Japanese selected 750 POWs to repair an airfield in a different location. Not selected for his detail, LeFleur traded places with another man so that he could accompany the group. They were loaded into the holds of the Shinyu Maru, a merchant ship, for transport. It was considered a hell ship due to its barbaric conditions.

On September 7th, USS Paddle, an American submarine, spotted the Shinyu Maru. It was not flying a white flag, the usual indication for a prisoner ship. The Paddle torpedoed the Shiyu Maru, believing it was a troop transport ship. With the ship on fire and sinking, the POWs managed to open a hatch out of the holds and escape. The guards started shooting into the holds and tossing grenades into them. LeFleur was last seen pushing the weakened men to the hatch, refusing to save himself. Of the 750 POWs on the ship, only 83 managed to escape and swim to safety. LeFleur was presumed to have died on the Shiyu Maru.

== Military awards ==
=== Distinguished Service Cross ===
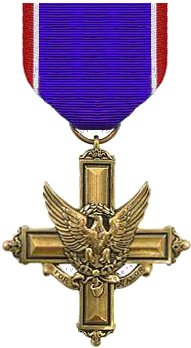
Army Distinguished Service Cross

LaFleur was awarded his first Distinguished Service Cross in 1942.

Citation:

"The President of the United States of America, authorized by Act of Congress, July 9, 1918, takes pleasure in presenting the Distinguished Service Cross to First Lieutenant (Chaplain) Joseph Verbis LaFleur (ASN: 0-413997), United States Army Air Forces, for extraordinary heroism in connection with military operations against an armed enemy while serving as Chaplain in Headquarters Squadron, 19th Bombardment Group (H), FIFTH Air Force, in action against enemy forces during the first Japanese attack on a Philippine Island airport on December 8, 1941. Chaplain LaFleur worked among the wounded, removing them to safety, and comforting the dying. First Lieutenant LaFleur's intrepid actions, personal bravery and zealous devotion to duty exemplify the highest traditions of the military forces of the United States and reflect great credit upon himself, the 5th Air Force and the United States Army Air Forces."

=== Purple Heart ===
Bronze Leaf Oak Cluster

LaFleur was posthumously awarded his second Distinguished Service Cross and the Purple Heart medals in 2017.

Citation:

"The President of the United States of America, authorized by Act of Congress of July 1918, takes pride in presenting a Bronze Oak Leaf Cluster in lieu of a Second Award of the Distinguished Service Cross (Posthumously) to First Lieutenant (Chaplain) Joseph Verbis LaFleur (ASN: 0-413997), United States Army Air Forces, for extraordinary heroism from December 30, 1941 through September 7,1944. While evading capture aboard the S.S. MAYTON, Chaplain LaFleur was instrumental in saving three men who jumped overboard during an attack from a Japanese bomber. After the three men were rescued, he then assisted Soldiers into lifeboats until he was the last man on the ship, denying his own chance to escape to Australia. As a Prisoner of War after January 1, 1942, Chaplain LaFleur constructed a chapel at the prison camp to minister to men of all faiths. He continuously advocated for food and medicine for the prisoners often intervening on their behalf, resulting in beatings at the hands of his captors. Later, while aboard the "hell ship" SHINYO MARU bound for Japan, he organized distribution of the meager rations allotted to approximately 400 prisoners and was observed giving his rations to others. On September 7, 1944, the submarine U.S.S. PADDLE, believing the ship was transporting Japanese Soldiers, sank the SHINYO MARU. Chaplain LaFleur was last seen aiding prisoners to escape in spite of Japanese guards firing small arms weapons and throwing hand grenades into the ship's hold. Chaplain LaFleur's personal valor and self-sacrifice in the face of grave danger are in keeping with the highest traditions of military service and reflect great credit upon himself and the Army of the United States."

- Bronze Star Medal

== Cause of beatification ==
In 2020, Bishop John Douglas Deshotel of the Diocese of Lafayette opened the cause for Lafleur's beatification. Lafleur is the third candidate for beatification from the diocese.

In 2021, Archbishop Timothy P. Broglio of the Archdiocese for the Military Services, voiced his support for the LaFleur beatification, saying he hopes it "meets with rapid success!"

== See also ==
- List of Americans venerated in the Catholic Church
