= Shin'yō Maru =

Shin'yō Maru may refer to the following ships:

- Japanese cargo ship Shinyō Maru No. 3 (1917), World War II era Japanese cargo ship
- SS Shinyō Maru, World War II era Japanese cargo ship and hellship
- SS Shinyō Maru (1911), Japanese passenger liner

== See also ==
- Shin'yō Maru incident
