= SS Brazil Maru =

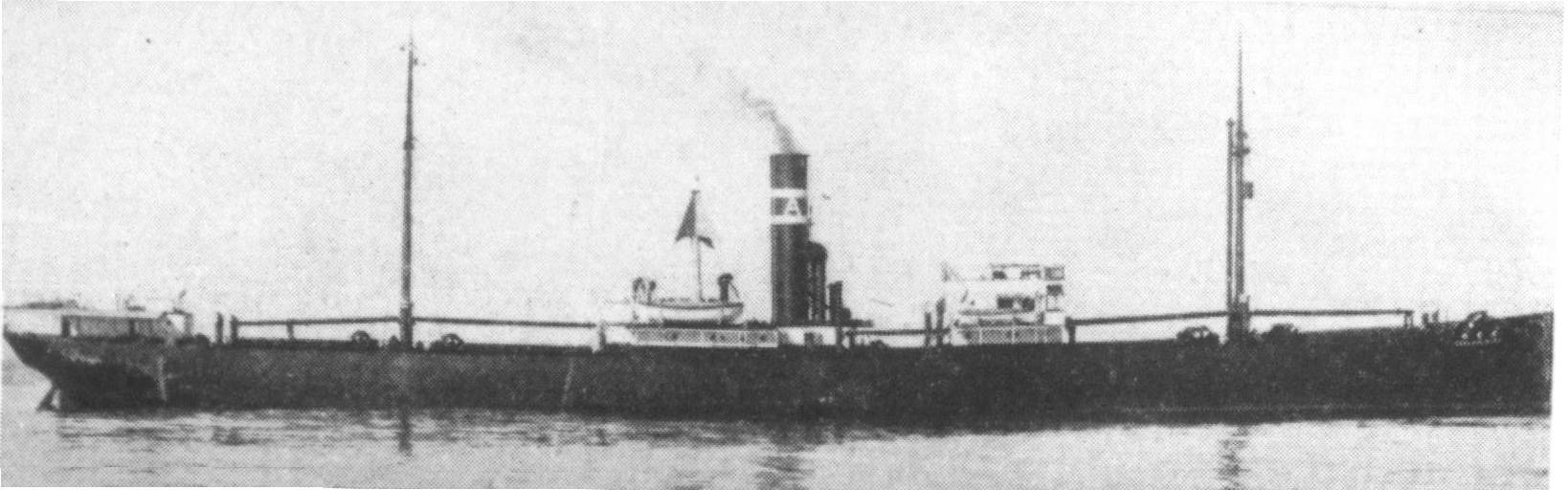
- Brazil Maru

History

Empire of Japan
- Name: Brazil Maru
- Namesake: Brazil
- Builder: Kawasaki
- Laid down: 10 April 1919
- Completed: 31 May 1919
- Fate: Sunk, 12 May 1945 34.666°N 135.2°E

General characteristics
- Type: Transport
- Tonnage: 5,859 GRT
- Length: 117.35 m
- Beam: 15.54 m
- Depth: 10.97 m
- Installed power: 3,858IHP
- Speed: 10/13.6kt

SS Brazil Maru was a Japanese cargo ship requisitioned by the Imperial Japanese Navy during World War II as a troop transport and prisoner of war (POW) transport ship.

Japanese POW transport ships are usually referred to as hell ships, due to the notoriously bad conditions aboard and the many deaths that occurred on the ships. The Japanese did not mark their prisoner transports, leading to numerous casualties from friendly fire attacks.

On December 27, 1944 Brazil Maru, along with Enoura Maru, were enlisted to transport the survivors from such an attack, by American forces on Oryoku Maru in Subic Bay. Although both ships had been hauling livestock, no attempt had been made to clean out the manure prior to the boarding of the prisoners, nor was any food for the prisoners loaded. They docked at Takao (now Kaohsiung) in Japanese Formosa on New Year's Day 1945. Enoura Maru was bombed during an American air raid on Takao on January 9, and the surviving prisoners were loaded onto Brazil Maru. It departed on January 14 bound for Moji, where it arrived on January 29. An estimated 500 prisoners died aboard Brazil Maru during the voyage from Takao to Moji, although sources vary.

Brazil Maru was sunk by a mine at Kobe on 12 May 1945.
