= Shin'yō Maru incident =

1944 killing in the Philippines by Japan

Shinyō Maru incident
- Part of the Pacific War of World War II
- Mindanao (Philippines)
Date	September 7, 1944
Location	off Sindangan, Zamboanga del Norte, Philippines, Sulu Sea
Result	See Aftermath section

Belligerents
United States	Japan

Commanders and leaders
Byron Nowell	Unknown

Strength
1 submarine	2 torpedo boats 2 tankers 4 cargo ships

Casualties and losses
1 submarine damaged 687 Allied POWs killed by the Japanese or friendly fire	47 killed 1 tanker sunk 1 cargo ship grounded

The Shin'yō Maru incident occurred in the Philippines on September 7, 1944, in the Pacific theater of World War II. In an attack on a Japanese convoy by the United States Navy submarine USS Paddle, 668 Allied prisoners of war were killed fighting their Japanese guards or killed when their ship, Shinyō Maru, was sunk. Only 82 Americans survived and were later rescued.

== Background ==
Following the conquest of the Philippines in 1942 and the surrender of the United States Army, thousands of Allied prisoners of war, mostly American, were being held on the islands which by 1944 were soon to be invaded by General Douglas MacArthur. To prevent the liberation of the prisoners in the Philippines, the Japanese established a system of transportation called "hell ships" by those being transported. Hell ships were ordinary merchant ships used to transport the Allied prisoners from the Philippines to elsewhere in the Japanese empire. The ships were so-called because prisoners were transported in inhumane and unsanitary conditions amounting to torture.

Shinyō Maru was one of these ships; displacing 2,744 gross registered tons, she was a cargo steamship impounded by the Japanese in 1941 and crewed by both merchant sailors and Imperial Japanese Army soldiers. The soldiers manned the ship's machine gun and guarded 750 Allied prisoners in the holds, almost 300 of whom were survivors of the Bataan Death March. The Japanese commander is said to have been extremely ruthless. Expecting an attack by the Allies, he told the prisoners that if the ship were fired on, he would order the guards to begin killing them.

== Incident ==
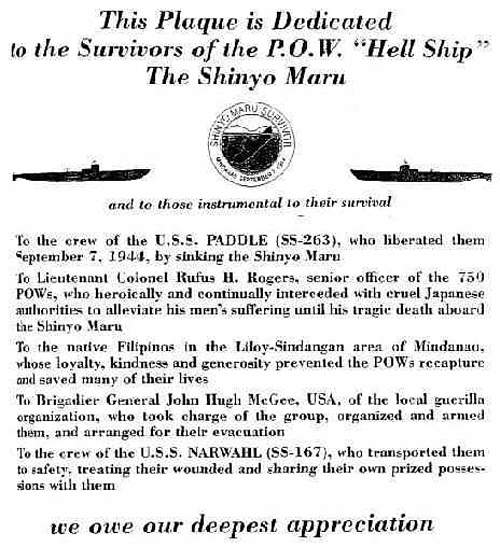
"Hell Ship" plaque for survivors of Shinyō Maru

On September 7, Shinyō Maru was sailing for Manila in convoy C-076 with seven other vessels, including two torpedo boats, two tankers, and four other medium and small cargo ships. They were two to three miles off the Lanboyan Point of Zamboanga Peninsula on the island of Mindanao, when USS Paddle found them. A few days previously, American intelligence had reported Shinyō Maru to be carrying Japanese soldiers, so they assigned Paddle to search for it. Paddle, under the command of Captain Byron Nowell, was 10 miles away when the Japanese were first spotted, so Nowell maneuvered forward to attack with torpedoes. A spread of four was then fired toward Shinyō Maru, which was the leading ship in the convoy. Two of the torpedoes struck, both in the hold, and a few moments later Paddle was lined up against one of the cargo ships. It, too, was struck by two torpedoes, so her commander grounded her on the nearby shore to prevent the ship from sinking. Just after Shinyō Maru was hit, the guards opened fire on the prisoners with captured Thompson submachine guns, though several of the men fought their way out of the hold, with their fists and improvised weapons, and abandoned ship.

The men of the convoy then began launching boats to pick up Japanese survivors and kill all of the remaining prisoners. A machine gun mounted on the grounded cargo ship and a second on Shinyō Maru were also opened up on the Allied personnel. Marine Corps Sergeant Onnie Clem later reported: "Up on the bridge there was a machine gun spraying the hatch. A burst of machine-gun fire caught all three of us and knocked us back down in the hold. We'd all been hit. I got plowed in the skull. Another bullet chipped out my chin. Nevertheless, I was able to work myself back up on deck, and I was eyeing that bridge when I came out that time. The gun was still there, but the gunner was laying out on deck. Somebody had apparently got up there and killed him. At this time I found out that we were out in the ocean about two or three miles from shore. All I had was a loincloth." 15 or 20 others were recaptured and taken aboard one of the torpedo boats, where they were executed by firing squad as punishment for trying to escape. One of those men was able to free his hands which had been tied behind his back, and he successfully escaped by jumping overboard again. The Japanese dropped 45 depth charges and other explosives on the American submarine over the course of two hours, and the ship sustained some light damage, but nobody was hurt. After that, she surfaced and began patrolling the area again.

== Aftermath ==
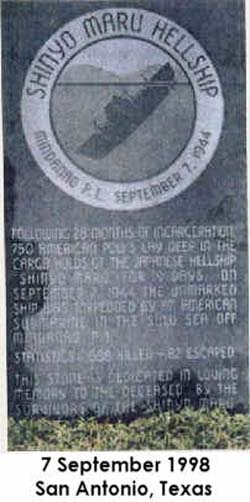
"Hell ship" plaque in San Antonio, Texas, dedicated in 1998 on the 54th anniversary of the massacre

Of 750 Allied prisoners of war, 668 were killed, all but five of whom were American servicemen. At least 47 Japanese personnel were also killed; only three men of Shinyō Maru's crew survived. 83 Americans made it to the shores of Sindangan Bay, and they received aid from friendly Filipino guerrillas under the command of Brigadier General Wendell Fertig, who radioed headquarters about the situation. One man died the following day on September 8, the remaining survivors were eventually rescued by the submarine USS Narwhal save First Sergeant Joseph P. Coe Jr who remained on Mindanao to continue fighting, for which he later received a Bronze Star. The crew of USS Paddle was not informed of the deaths of hundreds of Allied POWs until 1946.

American survivors of the massacre have held a number of reunions. The last was in 1998 on the 54th anniversary. It was in San Antonio, Texas, to unveil an inscribed stone plaque to commemorate the victims. 17 survivors of the massacre and one member of USS Paddle's crew were present. A memorial shrine was also erected in Sindangan on September 7, 2014, commemorating the 70th anniversary of the incident, honoring the victims, survivors, as well as locals for their hospitality and help.

== See also ==
- Joseph Verbis Lafleur – Catholic Chaplain who was killed aboard Shin'yō Maru
- Jun'yō Maru – Hell ship sunk September 1944
- Ōryoku Maru – Hell ship sunk December 1944
- Japanese war crimes
- List of war crimes committed during World War II
