= 3390 =

3390 may refer to:

- A.D. 3390, a year in the 4th millennium CE
- 3390 BC, a year in the 4th millennium BCE
- 3390, a number in the 3000 (number) range

== Other uses ==
- 3390 Demanet, an asteroid in the Asteroid Belt, the 3390th asteroid registered
- Nokia 3390, a cellphone
- IBM 3390, a hard disk drive unit
- Texas Farm to Market Road 3390, a state highway

== See also ==
- USS Eastern Chief (ID-3390), a WWI U.S. Navy cargo ship
