= Kihachiro Ueda =

Kihachiro Ueda (上田毅八郎) was a Japanese painter. His primary subject matter is Japanese ships.

During the Second World War, Ueda was an anti-aircraft gunner assigned to several merchant ships. He served on about 28 merchant ships, and 6 of those were attacked and destroyed while he was aboard. During his spare time, he would draw ships. On 13 November 1944, while assigned to Kinka Maru, he was severely injured during a U.S. air raid on Manila Bay. He lost the use of his right hand, but subsequently was able to draw and paint with his left hand.

His painting of the Ōryoku Maru (sunk 15 December 1944) is part of the Hell Ship Memorial Project's display at the Subic Bay Historical Center, Philippines.

Ueda started working with the model company Tamiya Corporation in the early 1960s. Ueda illustrated most of the package artwork for Tamiya's Waterline Series (which consists of about 150 models).

Ueda died on 26 June 2016.

== See also ==
- List of Japanese hell ships
- Hell ship
