= Hōfuku Maru =

Japanese Dai-ichi Taifuku-class cargo ship

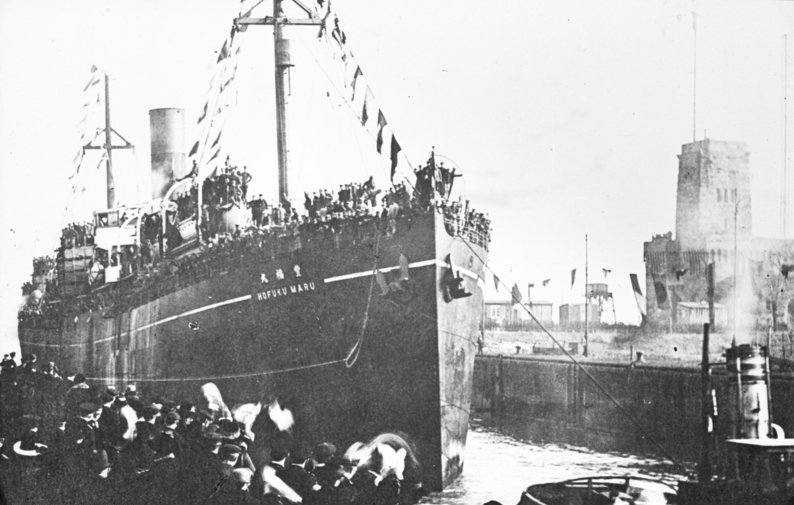
- German prisoners of war from the Siege of Tsingtao returning from Japan aboard Hōfuku Maru at Wilhelmshaven, Germany in February 1920

History

Japan
- Name: Hōfuku Maru (1918–1937); Hohuku Maru (1937–1944)
- Ordered: 1918
- Builder: Kawasaki Dockyard Company, Kobe
- Yard number: 423
- Laid down: August 6, 1918
- Launched: November 1, 1918
- In service: November 1918
- Out of service: September 21, 1944
- Identification: Official number 24035
- Fate: Sunk on September 21, 1944

General characteristics
- Class & type: Dai-ichi Taifuku-class cargo ship
- Tonnage: 5,857 GRT
- Length: 385 ft (117.3 m)
- Beam: 51 ft (15.5 m)
- Draught: 36 ft (11.0 m)
- Installed power: 436 NHP
- Propulsion: Triple-expansion steam engines
- Speed: 10 knots (19 km/h; 12 mph)

Hōfuku Maru, briefly known as Taifuku Maru No. 31 during construction, was a Japanese Dai-ichi Taifuku-class cargo ship, torpedoed and sunk on September 21, 1944, by United States Navy aircraft carrier-based aircraft. The whereabouts of the ship's wreckage remained a mystery until January 2026.

== Building and registration ==
Taifuku Maru was laid down at Kawasaki Dockyard Co. Ltd. as yard number 423 in Kobe in 1918 and was launched as Hōfuku Maru. The vessel was completed that same year. She had a length of 385 feet (117 m), a beam of 51 feet (16 m) and was assessed at 5,857 gross register tons (GRT). The ship could reach a maximum speed of 10 knots (19 km/h; 12 mph).

== Career ==
Hōfuku Maru entered service after the end of the First World War and was used to repatriate German prisoners of war (POWs), many of whom had been held in Bandō prisoner-of-war camp. Most of the prisoners had been taken after the Siege of Tsingtao in 1914. After that she served in her intended role as a cargo ship. In 1928 she was sold to the K Line and was placed on their Pacific Ocean routes. In 1937, she was renamed Hohuku Maru. In 1938 she was sold to the Kokusai Kisen K.K. And would serve them well until October 1941.

=== Service in the Second World War ===
In October 1941, Hohuku Maru was requisitioned by the Imperial Japanese Army for use as a hell ship for the Second World War. She would take prisoners of war to do forced labour in hellish conditions until September 1944, when she would sail on her final voyage.

=== Sinking ===
Hōhuku Maru was sailing from Singapore to Miri, Borneo, as part of convoy SHIMI-05. The convoy consisted of ten ships, five of which carried, in total, 5,000 POWs, all in poor conditions. At Borneo, Hōfuku Maru left the convoy with engine problems and sailed on to the Philippines, arriving on July 19. She remained at Manila until mid-September while the engines were repaired. The POWs remained on board, suffering from disease, hunger, and thirst.

On September 20, 1944, Hōfuku Maru and ten other ships formed Convoy MATA-27 and sailed from Manila to Japan. The following morning, the convoy was attacked 80 miles (130 km) north of Corregidor by more than 100 American aircraft carrier-based aircraft. All eleven ships in the convoy were sunk. Of those on Hōfuku Maru, 1,047 of the 1,289 British and Dutch POWs on board died. 242 POWs swam to shore, and 42 were rescued by kaibōkans.

=== Wreck ===
On January 26, 2026, researchers and maritime investigators from the Hellships Memorial Foundation, along with Discovery Channel presenter and archaeologist Josh Gates, conducted several sonar surveys and diving inspections, and ultimately located the Hōfuku Maru about 160 meters off the coast of San Narciso, in the Zambales province of Luzon, Philippines. The wreck has since been designated as a protected maritime war grave.
