= USS LST-559 =

1944 LST-542-class tank landing ship

History

United States
- Name: USS LST-559
- Builder: Missouri Valley Bridge and Iron Company, Evansville, Indiana
- Laid down: 14 February 1944
- Launched: 18 April 1944
- Sponsored by: Mrs. Carl J. Futter
- Commissioned: 9 May 1944
- Decommissioned: 1 June 1946
- Stricken: 19 June 1946
- Honors and awards: Four battle stars for World War II
- Fate: Sold 5 December 1947; Sunk as breakwater

General characteristics
- Class & type: LST-542-class tank landing ship
- Displacement: 1,625 long tons (1,651 t) light; 4,080 long tons (4,145 t) full (seagoing draft with 1,675-ton load
- Length: 328 ft (100 m)
- Beam: 50 ft (15 m)
- Draft: Unloaded 2 ft 4 in (0.71 m) forward; 7 ft 6 in (2.29 m) aft; Full load: 8 ft 2 in (2.49 m) forward; 14 ft 1 in (4.29 m) aft; Landing with 500-ton load: 3 ft 11 in (1.19 m) forward; 9 ft 10 in (3.00 m) aft
- Installed power: 1,800 horsepower (1.34 megawatts)
- Propulsion: Two 900-horsepower (0.67-megawatt) General Motors 12-567 diesel engines, two shafts, twin rudders
- Speed: 12 knots (22 km/h; 14 mph)
- Range: 24,000 nautical miles (44,448 kilometerss) at 9 knots while displacing 3,960 tons
- Boats & landing craft carried: 2 x LCVPs
- Capacity: 1,600-1,900 tons cargo depending on mission
- Troops: 16 officers, 147 enlisted men
- Complement: 7 officers, 104 enlisted men
- Armament: 2 × twin 40 mm gun mounts; 4 × single 40-millimeter gun mounts; 12 × 20 mm guns

USS LST-559 was a United States Navy LST-542-class tank landing ship in commission from 1944 to 1946.

== Construction and commissioning ==
LST-559 was laid down on 14 February 1944 at Evansville, Indiana, by the Missouri Valley Bridge and Iron Company. She was launched on 18 April 1944, sponsored by Mrs. Carl J. Futter, and commissioned on 9 May 1944.

== Service history ==
During World War II, LST-559 was assigned to the Pacific Theater of Operations. She participated in the capture and occupation of the southern Palau Islands in September and October 1944. She then took part in the Philippines campaign, participating in the Leyte landings in October and November 1944 and invasion of at Lingayen Gulf in January 1945. She then participated in the assault on and occupation of Okinawa Gunto in April 1945.

Following the war, LST-559 performed occupation duty in the Far East and service in China until mid-May 1946.

== Decommissioning and disposal ==
LST-559 was decommissioned on 1 June 1946 at Naval Station Subic Bay on Luzon in the Philippines. She stricken from the Navy List on 19 June 1946. On 5 December 1947, she was sold to Bosey in the Philippines, where her hulk was sunk to extend the breakwater in Subic Bay.

== Honors and awards ==
LST-559 earned four battle stars for her World War II service.
