= USS Eastern Chief =

Japanese-built cargo steamship

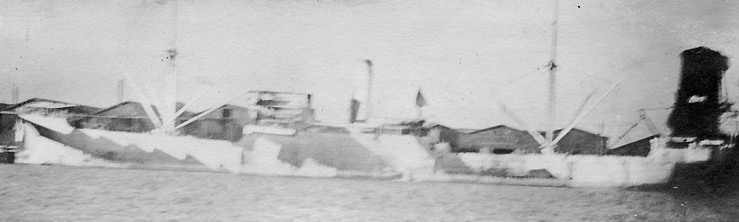
- Eastern Chief in pattern camouflage, possibly in 1918

History

United States
- Name: 1917: Yoshida Maru No. 3; 1918: Eastern Chief
- Owner: US Shipping Board
- Operator: 1918–19: US Navy
- Port of registry: Seattle
- Builder: Uraga Dock Company, Uraga
- Completed: December 1917
- Acquired: for US Navy, 25 Sep 1918
- Commissioned: into US Navy, 27 Sep 1918
- Decommissioned: from US Navy, 29 May 1919
- Identification: US official number 216482; 1918–19: ID number ID–3390; until 1933: code letters LKWN; by 1934: call sign KJIM
- Fate: scrapped 1935

General characteristics
- Type: cargo ship
- Tonnage: 4,660 GRT, 3,578 NRT
- Displacement: 9,606 tons
- Length: 360.0 ft (109.7 m)
- Beam: 51.0 ft (15.5 m)
- Draft: 23 ft 2 in (7.1 m)
- Depth: 28.4 ft (8.7 m)
- Decks: 2
- Installed power: 378 NHP, 2,400 ihp
- Propulsion: 1 × triple-expansion engine; 1 × screw
- Speed: 12 knots (22 km/h)
- Complement: in US Navy, 70

USS Eastern Chief (ID-3390) was cargo steamship that was built in Japan in 1917 as Yoshida Maru No. 3. The United States Shipping Board (USSB) bought her and renamed her Eastern Chief. From September 1918 to May 1919 she spent eight months in the United States Navy, in which she made two transatlantic round trips between Virginia and France. She was scrapped in 1935.

== Building and registration ==
In 1917 the Uraga Dock Company in Uraga, Kanagawa built a pair of sister ships. Kirishima Maru No. 6 was completed in October, followed by Yoshida Maru No. 3 in December.

Yoshida Maru No. 3's registered length was 360.0 ft (109.7 m), her beam was 51.0 ft (15.5 m), her depth was 28.4 ft (8.7 m) and her draft was 23 ft 2 in (7.1 m). Her tonnages were 4,660 GRT, 3,578 NRT, and 9,606 tons displacement.

She had a single screw, driven by a three-cylinder triple-expansion engine. It was rated at 378 NHP or 2,400 ihp, and gave her a speed of 12 knots (22 km/h).

The USSB bought Kirishima Maru No. 6 and Yoshida Maru No. 3, renamed them Eastern Cross and Eastern Chief respectively, and registered them in Seattle. Eastern Chief's US official number was 216482 and her code letters were LKWN.

The USSB ordered three more ships from Uraga to the same design. Eastern Breeze was completed in October 1919, followed by Eastern Gale in November 1919, and Eastern Tempest in April 1920. Suez Maru, completed in August 1919, was also built to the same design. She remained in Japanese service, became a Second World War hell ship, and was sunk with great loss of life in 1943.

== US Navy ==
The 6th Naval District inspected Eastern Chief at Charleston, South Carolina on 10 September 1918, and she was transferred to the US Navy on 26 September at Charleston Navy Yard. She was commissioned on 27 September 1918 as USS Eastern Chief, with the ID number ID–3390.

Eastern Chief made two round trips with the Naval Overseas Transportation Service. On the first, she left Hampton Roads, Virginia, on 9 October 1918. She called at Sydney, Nova Scotia, for repairs, and on 26 November 1918 reached La Pallice, France, where she discharged her cargo and loaded ordnance and engineering stores. She left La Pallice on 14 December 1918, and reached Norfolk, Virginia, on 8 January 1919.

On 9 February 1919 Eastern Chief left Norfolk for France. On 15 February she stood by the disabled cargo ship USS West Haven until a tugboat arrived. Eastern Chief and the tug then towed West Haven to Bermuda. Eastern Chief resumed her eastbound crossing, and reached La Pallice on 23 February. She discharged part of her cargo at La Pallice, and the remainder at Antwerp in Belgium. She left Antwerp on 3 May and reached Norfolk on 23 May.

The Navy decommissioned Eastern Chief on 29 May 1919, and returned her to the USSB the same day.

== Later years ==
Eastern Chief remained in USSB ownership. The Board neither sold her, nor found work for her via a ship management company. By 1934 her wireless telegraph call sign was KJIM, and this had superseded her code letters. She was scrapped in 1935.

== Bibliography ==
- Lloyd's Register of Shipping. Vol. II.–Steamers. London: Lloyd's Register of Shipping. 1919 – via Internet Archive.
- Lloyd's Register of Shipping. Vol. II.–Steamers. London: Lloyd's Register of Shipping. 1921 – via Internet Archive.
- Lloyd's Register of Shipping (PDF). Vol. II.–Steamers and Motorships of 300 tons gross and over. London: Lloyd's Register of Shipping. 1934 – via Southampton City Council.
- Lloyd's Register of Shipping (PDF). Vol. II.–Steamers and Motorships of 300 tons gross and over. London: Lloyd's Register of Shipping. 1935 – via Southampton City Council.
