= SS Suez Maru =

Japanese steamship and hell ship

History

Empire of Japan
- Name: Suez Maru
- Namesake: Suez
- Owner: 1919: Kokusai Kisen KK; 1934: Kuribayashi Shosen KK
- Port of registry: 1919: Uraga; 1934: "Okada"
- Builder: Uraga Dock Company, Uraga
- Yard number: 150
- Launched: 1919
- Completed: August 1919
- Out of service: 29 November 1943
- Identification: code letters RMBP; call sign JSCD
- Fate: Torpedoed and sunk, 29 November 1943

General characteristics
- Type: passenger and cargo ship
- Tonnage: 4,646 GRT, 3,330 NRT
- Length: 360.0 ft (109.7 m)
- Beam: 51.2 ft (15.6 m)
- Draft: 23 ft 2 in (7.1 m)
- Depth: 26.1 ft (8.0 m)
- Decks: 2
- Installed power: 377 NHP
- Propulsion: 1 × triple-expansion engine; 1 × screw
- Speed: 10.5 knots (19 km/h)

Suez Maru was a Japanese passenger and cargo steamship that was built in 1919, used as a hell ship, and sunk in 1943. The submarine USS Bonefish sank her when she was carrying 548 Allied prisoners of war (PoWs). Many drowned, but many others were shot by the Japanese.

== Building ==
The Uraga Dock Company in Uraga, Kanagawa built Suez Maru as yard number 150. She was completed in August 1919. Her registered length was 360.0 ft (109.7 m), her beam was 51.2 ft (15.6 m), her depth was 26.1 ft (8.0 m) and her draft was 23 ft 2 in (7.1 m).

She had a single screw, driven by a three-cylinder triple-expansion engine. It was rated at 377 nominal horspeower, and gave her a speed of 10.5 knots (19 km/h).

Suez Maru was a sister ship of Kirishima Maru No. 6 and Yoshida Maru No. 3, which the United States Shipping Board bought and renamed Eastern Cross and Eastern Chief.

== Ownership and registration ==
Suez Maru'S first owner was Kokusai Kisen KK. She was registered at Uraga, and her code letters were RMBP. In 1934 Kuribayashi Shosen KK acquired her, and at the same time the wireless telegraph call sign JSCD superseded her code letters. Lloyd's Register lists her port of registry from 1934 as "Okada". However, no such port exists.

== Loss ==
Suez Maru sailed on 25 November 1943 with 550 POWs (the men were English, Welsh, Scottish, Irish, Dutch and one was a New Zealander) from Ambon bound for Surabaya. The POWs were all sick men from the work-camps on the Moluccas and Ambon. About 20 were on stretchers. There were also about 200 wounded Japanese soldiers aboard, including Yoshio Kashiki.

On 29 November 1943, near Kangean Island, east of Madura Island, USS Bonefish torpedoed Suez Maru. Those PoWs in the rearmost hold (four) of the ship were either killed by the direct torpedo hit or were unable to escape, while those PoWs in hold three, numbering 250 to 380 escaped and jumped into the water. Around seven hours later the escort ship, minesweeper No.12 returned from its unsuccessful attempt to locate and depth charge the USS Bonefish. The minesweeper then picked up Japanese only survivors, pushing any PoWs back into the water if they tried to climb aboard.

Then, Captain Kawano Osumu, commander of W-12, discussed with the PoW transport commander Lieutenant Masaji Koshio (also called Masaji Iketani) what should be done with the surviving PoWs. Koshio/Iketani told him that Major General Sanso Anami had ordered that if the ship were torpedoed, the PoWs should be shot. Captain Kawano quickly agreed, ordering gunnery officer Daiso Yatsuka to arrange 20 soldiers with rifles on deck and two machine-guns on the lower bridge, while other crew pointed out survivors amongst the wreckage. The gunnery crew then machine-gunned all surviving PoWs in the water. All PoWs were killed.

The minesweeper No.12 report lodged at Batavia on 3 December 1943 falsely stated that the PoWs were "kept locked in the holds due to the need for strict security", and that "all POWs had gone down with the ship", and made no mention of the war crime.

== Investigation ==
This war crime was extensively investigated in 1949, after it was reported by Yoshio Kashiki, who was one of the 200 or so wounded Japanese soldiers aboard Suez Maru that day. Dozens of first hand accounts and sworn statements were taken from 22 individuals, suspects and eyewitnesses, including signed confessions. Kawano and Iketani were arrested. After the investigation, the UK government wanting to protect its own reputation. It ordered the release of the men arrested for war crimes, ordered that no war crime trial should be held, and ordered a cover-up. The UK government never told the families of those PoWs who were killed what had happened. To date, the Japanese government has never apologised for the treatment and killing of PoWs, and the UK government has never apologised for refusing to bring the known war criminals to justice at court.

At the National Memorial Arboretum at Alrewas, Staffordshire a memorial to the UK POWs aboard Suez Maru whom the Japanese murdered was dedicated on 29 November 2013, on the 70th anniversary of the massacre. In 2015, a Japanese Hellship Memorial Garden was built around it. An 80th anniversary service was held at the memorial on 29 November 2023, a video of this service can be found on YouTube, <iframe width="560" height="315" src="https://www.youtube.com/embed/NUp_I3o8jT8?si=t2c41tII3tsno4Ta" title="YouTube video player" frameborder="0" allow="accelerometer; autoplay; clipboard-write; encrypted-media; gyroscope; picture-in-picture; web-share" referrerpolicy="strict-origin-when-cross-origin" allowfullscreen></iframe>

== Bibliography ==
- Frith, Jacquelyn (2020). Unwritten Letters To Spring Street. the story of Jack Frith, a victim of the WW2 Japanese hell-ship, Suez Maru. Clink Street. ISBN 978-1913568276.
- Jones, Allan (2002). The Suez Maru atrocity: justice denied!: the story of Lewis Jones, a victim of a WW2 Japanese hell-ship. Hornchurch: AD Jones. ISBN 978-0954272500.
- Lloyd's Register of Shipping. Vol. II.–Steamers. London: Lloyd's Register of Shipping. 1919 – via Internet Archive.
- Lloyd's Register of Shipping (PDF). Vol. II.–Steamers and Motorships of 300 tons gross and over. London: Lloyd's Register of Shipping. 1934 – via Southampton City Council.
