= Kampong Makassar =

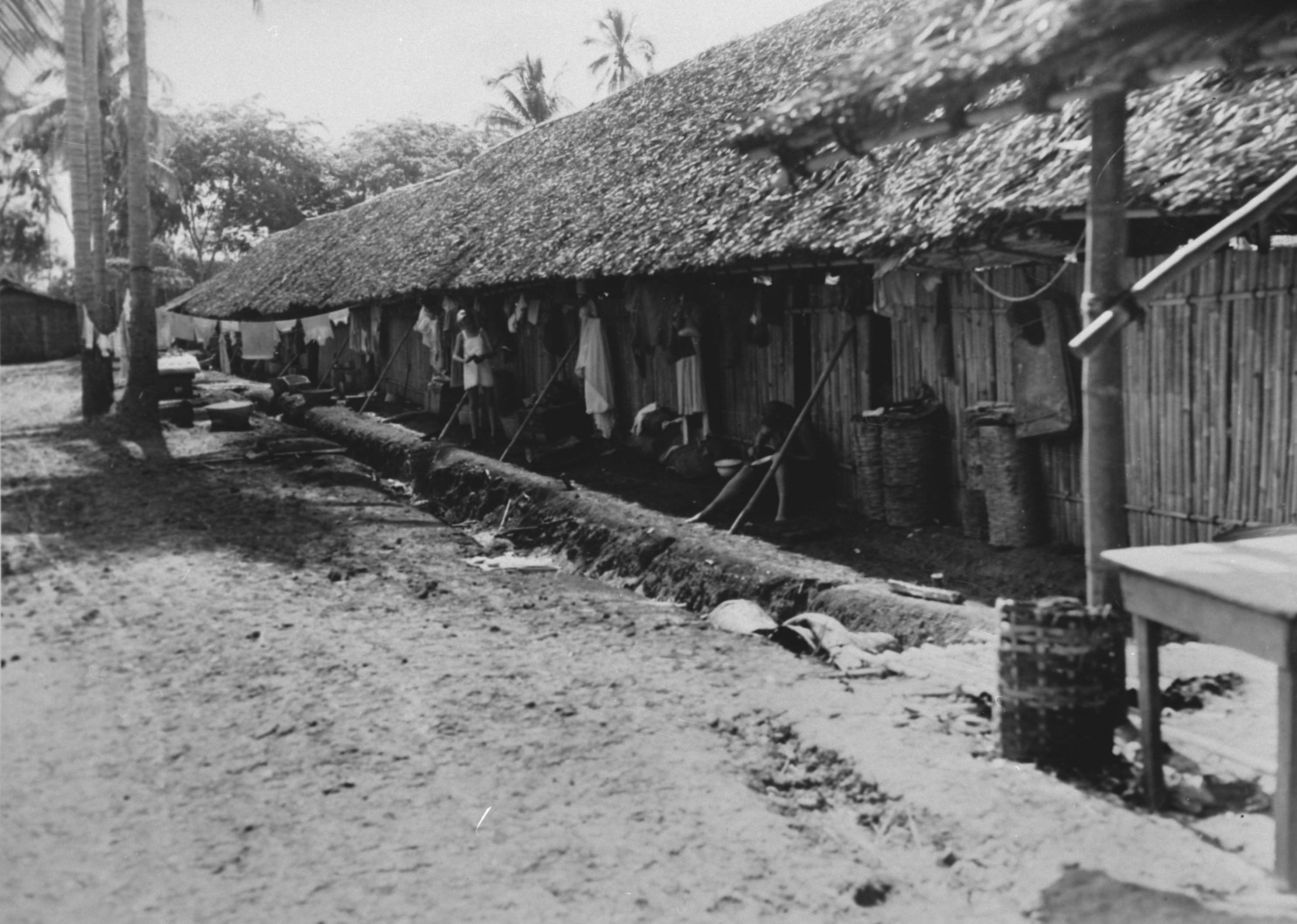
Internment camp Kampong Makassar (Jakarta) during the Japanese occupation of the Dutch East Indies, October 1945

Kampong Makassar was one several internment camps in the island of Java near Batavia (present-day Jakarta) in which the Japanese interned enemy civilians, mostly Dutch, after the Dutch East Indies fell to Japanese forces in 1942. Between January and October 1945, Kampong Makassar functioned as prisoners of war, civilian, and relief camps respectively.
