= SS Shinyō Maru =

Second World War Japanese hell ship

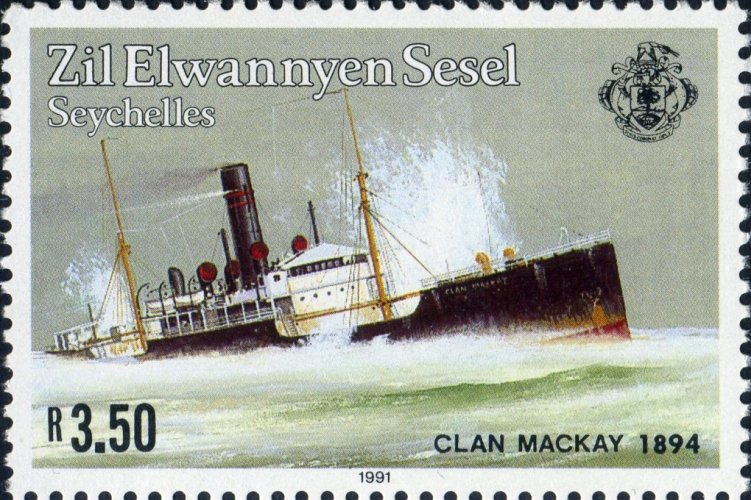
- Seychelles postage stamp of the ship as Clan Mackay

History
- Name: 1894: Clan Mackay; 1913: Ceduna; 1924: Tung-Tuck; 1937: Chang Teh; 1937: Pananis; 1943: Shin'yō Maru
- Namesake: 1894: Clan Mackay; 1913: Ceduna, South Australia
- Owner: 1894: Cayzer, Irvine & Co; 1901: The Clan Line Steamers Ltd; 1913: Adelaide SS Co; 1924: John McLeod Bolton; 1924: Woo Kuei Fen; 1936: Tung Tuck SS Co; 1937: Lee Yuen SS Co; 1937: JD Tsounias; 1941: Japanese Government
- Operator: 1924: Tung Tuck & Co; 1937: China Hellenic Lines Ltd
- Port of registry: 1894: (United Kingdom) Glasgow; 1913: (Australia) Sydney; 1924: (China) Shanghai; 1937: (Greece) Piraeus; 1941: (Empire of Japan)
- Builder: Naval Construction & Armament Co, Barrow-in-Furness
- Cost: £28,500
- Yard number: 229
- Launched: 31 October 1894
- Completed: December 1894
- Identification: UK official number 104593; UK code letters NPRV
- Captured: by Japanese forces, 1941
- Fate: Torpedoed and sunk, 1944

General characteristics
- Type: cargo ship
- Tonnage: 1896: 2,600 GRT, 1,665 NRT; 1937: 2,744 GRT, 1,600 NRT
- Length: 312.0 ft (95.1 m)
- Beam: 40.2 ft (12.3 m)
- Draught: 1 ft 0 in (0.3 m)
- Depth: 24.7 ft (7.5 m)
- Decks: 2
- Installed power: 317 NHP
- Propulsion: triple-expansion engine
- Speed: 13 1/2 knots (25.0 km/h)
- Crew: as hell ship: 52 crew and guards
- Notes: sister ships: Clan Ross, Clan Campbell

Shin'yō Maru was a cargo steamship that was built in 1894, had a fifty-year career under successive British, Australian, Chinese and Greek owners, was captured by Japan in the Second World War, and sunk by a United States Navy submarine in 1944.

She was built in England for Clan Line as Clan Mackay. She was the second of five Clan Line ships to be named after that clan. In 1913 the Adelaide Steamship Company bought her and renamed her Ceduna. In 1924 Tung Tuck & Co acquired her and renamed her Tung-Tuck. In 1937 Lee Yuen Steamship Co acquired her and renamed her Chang Teh, then passed her on to China Hellenic Lines who renamed her Pananis.

Japanese forces captured Pananis in 1941, and renamed her Shin'yō Maru in 1943. In 1944 she was being used as a Hell ship when the submarine USS Paddle torpedoed her. 668 American and Allied prisoners of war (PoWs) were killed either by the torpedo explosions, or by Japanese guards who machine-gunned the PoWs.

== Building and first owner ==
In the 1892 UK general election Charles Cayzer, the senior partner in the Cayzer, Irvine & Co "Clan Line" shipping company, was the Conservative Party candidate for Barrow and Furness. He promised that if he were elected, he would bring work to the Naval Construction & Armament Co shipyard in the town. He was elected, and thereafter ordered a set of three cargo ships from the shipyard for £28,500 each.

The three sister ships were built as yard numbers 227, 228 and 229 and launched in 1894 as Clan Ross, Clan Campbell and Clan Mackay. Clan Mackay was the last of the three, being launched on 31 October 1894 and completed that December. They were the first Clan Line ships to be built with a straight stem instead of a clipper bow.

Clan Mackay's registered length was 312.0 ft (95.1 m), her beam was 40.2 ft (12.3 m) and her depth was 24.7 ft (7.5 m). Her tonnages were 2,600 GRT and 1,665 NRT. She had a single screw, driven by a three-cylinder triple-expansion engine that was rated at 317 NHP.

Cayzer, Irvine registered Clan Mackay at Glasgow. Her official number was 104593 and her code letters were NPRV.

In September 1899 Clan Mackay was involved in a collision, as a consequence of which she was beached. She was repaired and returned to service.

== Changes of owner ==
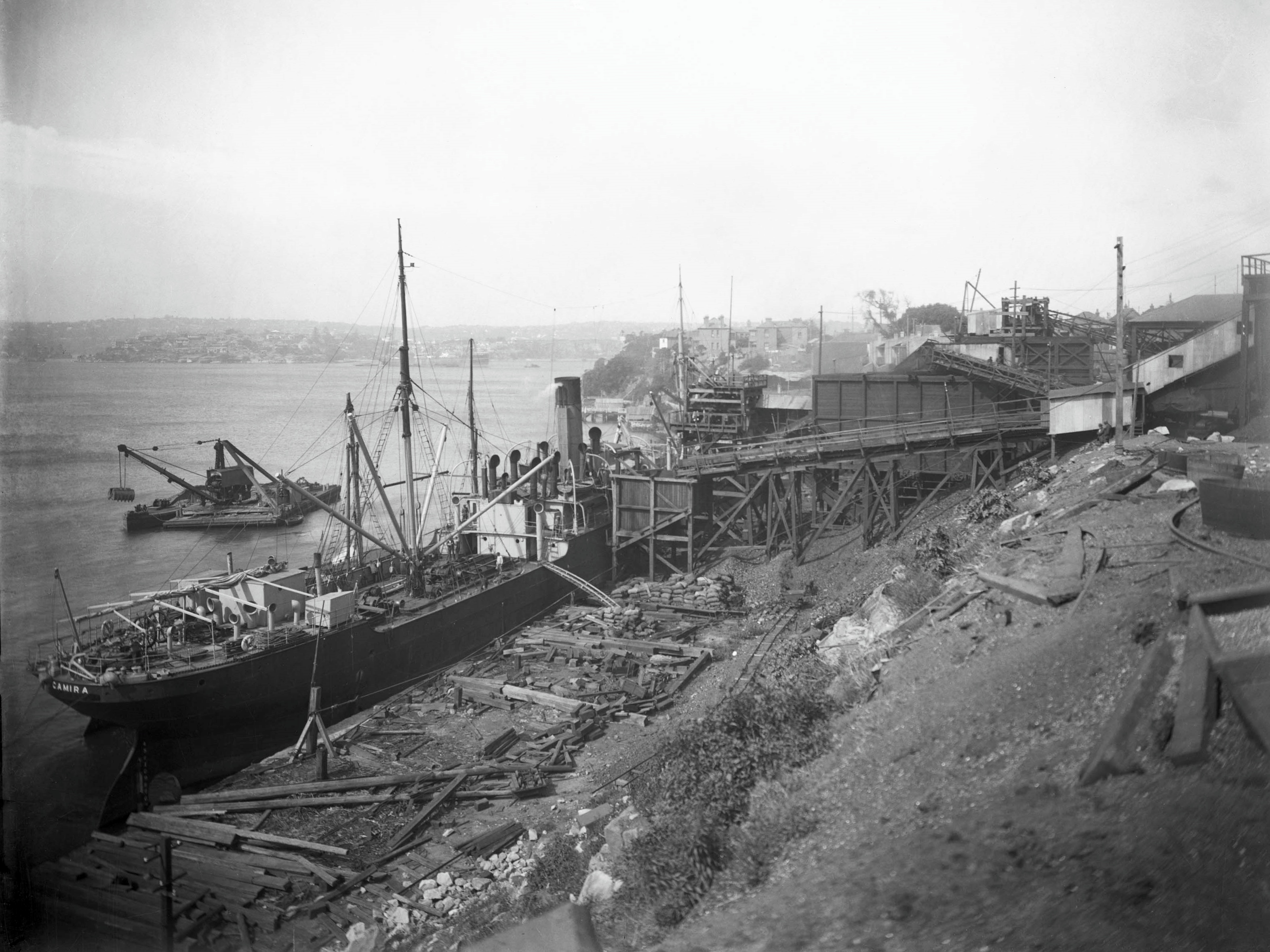
Sister ship Camira, formerly Clan Campbell, in Adelaide Steamship Company service

On 8 May 1913 the Adelaide Steamship Company of South Australia bought Clan Ross, Clan Campbell and Clan Mackay from Clan Line, and renamed them Cantara, Camira and Ceduna respectively. Ceduna was re-registered in Sydney, New South Wales, but kept her original code letters. By 1922 she was equipped for wireless telegraphy.

On 28 April 1924 a John McLeod Bolton of Sydney bought Cantara and Ceduna. On 28 July that year he sold Ceduna to Woo Kuei Fen, who renamed her Tung-Tuck, registered her in Shanghai and placed her under the management of Tung Tuck & Co.

On 17 October 1924, Bolton sold Cantara to a different Shanghai owner, and on 19 January 1925 the Adelaide SS Co sold Camira to another Shanghai owner. Thus by early in 1925 all three sister ships ended up renamed and with different owners, but all registered in Shanghai.

In 1937 Tung-Tuck passed to the Lee Yuen Steamship Co, who renamed her Chang Teh, but sold her on before the end of the year. Her new owner was JD Tsounias, who renamed her Pananis, registered her in Piraeus, and placed her in the management of China Hellenic Lines Ltd.

== Hell ship ==
Japanese forces seized Pananis in December 1941 and the Japanese Government became her owner. In 1943 she began war service as Shin'yō Maru, crewed by Japanese civilian sailors.

In August and September 1944, Allied intelligence intercepted Imperial Japanese Navy radio signals about Shin'yō Maru's intended movements. A signal sent on 6 September said that the next day she would leave Zamboanga in Mindanao, the Philippines in Convoy C–076. Fleet Radio Unit Pacific (FRUPAC) interpreted the signal to say that she would be carrying "750 troops for Manila via Cebu".

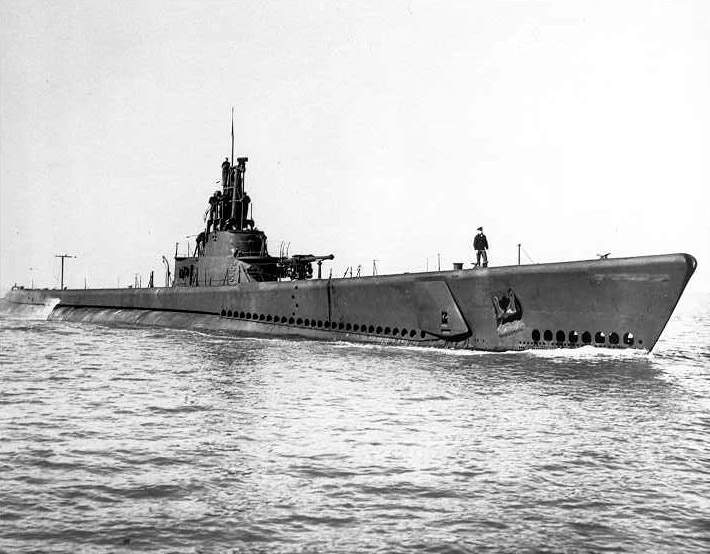
USS Paddle, which sank Shin'yō Maru

Shin'yō Maru was in Zamboanga, but in fact on 4 September she had embarked 750 PoWs in her three holds. All but five of them were American. She also carried Imperial Japanese Army soldiers to guard the PoWs. On 7 September her crew closed and secured her hatch covers, and she left port in a convoy comprising four cargo ships, two tankers, and an escort of two destroyers or torpedo boats. for 14 hours the convoy steamed without incident.

The US Navy sent the submarine USS Paddle to intercept the convoy and sink Shin'yō Maru. On 7 September Paddle found the convoy about 10 miles off Lanboyan Point on the Zamboanga Peninsula of Mindanao. Shin'yō Maru was leading the convoy. When the convoy was within two or three miles of Zamboanga Point, Paddle got into position and fired a spread of four torpedoes at her, two of which hit her in her holds. Paddle then torpedoed a second ship of the convoy, whose commander beached her to prevent her from sinking. The Japanese escorts then started unsuccessfully depth charging Paddle, but she dived deep and escaped serious damage.

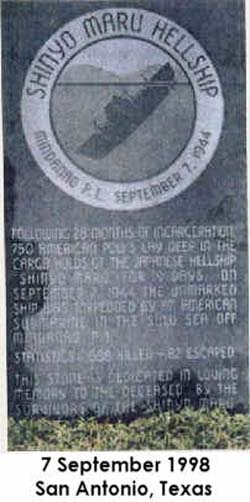
"Hell ship" plaque in San Antonio, Texas, dedicated on the 54th anniversary of the incident

The two torpedoes that hit Shin'yō Maru killed or wounded many of the PoWs in her holds, and some of her Japanese crew and guards. As she sank, the guards machine-gunned the PoWs to try to prevent them from abandoning ship. Some of the PoWs nevertheless tried to either abandon ship or attack the guards. The surviving ships of the convoy launched boats to rescue Shin'yō Maru's crew and guards. These boats also opened fire on the PoWs. A machine-gun mounted on the grounded ship also fired on the prisoners. Of 750 PoWs aboard the hell ship, 668 were killed. 83 got ashore alive, but one died the next day. 47 of her 52 Japanese crew and army guards were also killed.

The escaped PoWs went inland, where they met a Filipino guerilla group commanded by a US Colonel McGee. The guerillas radioed US forces, who sent the submarine USS Narwhal to rescue them. On 29 October 1944 Narwhal came into Sindangan Bay, where she embarked 81 of the 82 survivors. One survivor, Joseph Coe, chose to remain to serve with the guerillas.

On 30 December 1944 a note was pencilled on FRUPAC's record of the Japanese naval signal of 6 September. It says "FRUEF (31 Dec '44) gets 750 Ps/W". "FRUEF" is the British Radio Unit Eastern Fleet. "Ps/W" is prisoners of war. FRUPAC seems to have misinterpreted the Japanese signal, with fatal consequences.

== Monuments and commemorations ==
In 1991 the Seychelles Postal Service issued a set of four commemorative stamps featuring historic cargo ships. One featured an artwork of Clan Mackay at sea.

On 7 September 1998, the 54th anniversary of the sinking of Shin'yō Maru, a plaque commemorating the victims of the massacre was dedicated in San Antonio, Texas. The town of Sindangan, Zamboanga del Norte, dedicated a memorial on September 7, 2014, on the 70th Anniversary of the incident, remembering the victims and survivors of the Shinyo Maru, as well as the townsfolk who extended help.

== See also ==
- List of ships sunk by submarines by death toll
- List of Japanese hell ships

== Bibliography ==
- Clarkson, John; Fenton, Roy; Munro, Archie (2007). Clan Line Illustrated Fleet History. Preston: Ships in Focus. ISBN 978-1-901703-47-4.
- Haws, Duncan (1997). Clan, Houston, Turnbull Martin & Scottish Tankers. Merchant Fleets. Vol. 32. Pembroke: Travel Creatours Ltd Publications. ISBN 0-946378-32-0.
- Lloyd's Register of British and Foreign Shipping. Vol. I–Steamers. London: Lloyd's Register of Shipping. 1896 – via Internet Archive.
- Lloyd's Register of Shipping. Vol. II–Steamers and Motor Vessels. London: Lloyd's Register of Shipping. 1922 – via Internet Archive.
- Lloyd's Register of Shipping. Vol. II–Steamers and Motorships. London: Lloyd's Register of Shipping. 1926 – via Internet Archive.
- Lloyd's Register of Shipping (PDF). Vol. II–Steamers and Motorships. London: Lloyd's Register of Shipping. 1937 – via Southampton City Council.
- Mercantile Navy List. London. 1895 – via CrewList Index Project.
- Mercantile Navy List. London. 1914 – via CrewList Index Project.
- Morison, Samuel E (2002). History of United States Naval Operations in World War II. Vol. 12: Leyte, June 1944 – January 1945. Champaign, IL: University of Illinois Press. ISBN 0-252-07063-1.
