= USS Paddle =

Submarine of the United States

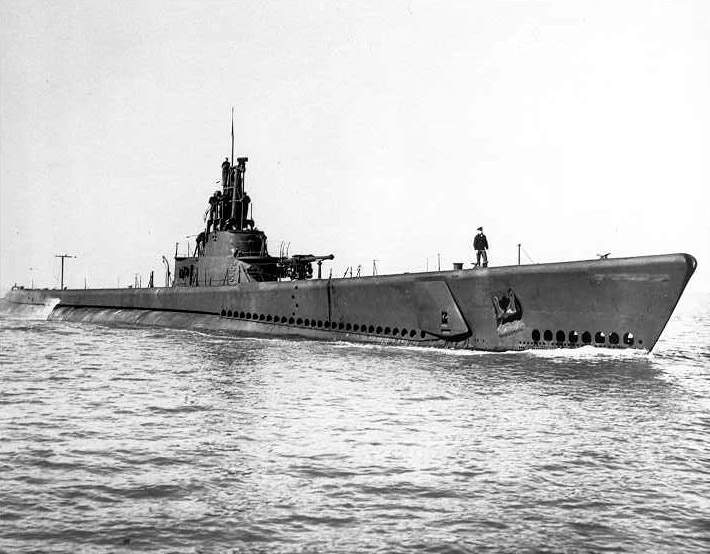
- Paddle (SS-263), underway, c. 1944-45.

History

United States
- Name: USS Paddle (SS-263)
- Namesake: Paddlefish
- Builder: Electric Boat Company, Groton, Connecticut
- Laid down: 1 May 1942
- Launched: 30 December 1942
- Commissioned: 29 March 1943
- Decommissioned: 1 February 1946
- Recommissioned: 31 August 1956
- Decommissioned: 18 January 1957
- Stricken: 30 June 1968
- Fate: Transferred to Brazil unmodified, 18 January 1957

History

Brazil
- Name: Riachuelo (S–15)
- Acquired: 18 January 1957
- Stricken: March 1968
- Fate: Sunk as a target around 30 June 1968

General characteristics
- Class & type: Gato-class diesel-electric submarine
- Displacement: 1,525 tons (1,549 t) surfaced, 2,424 tons (2,460 t) submerged
- Length: 311 ft 9 in (95.02 m)
- Beam: 27 ft 3 in (8.31 m)
- Draft: 17 ft 0 in (5.18 m) maximum
- Propulsion: 4 × Hooven-Owens-Rentschler (H.O.R.) diesel engines driving electrical generators; 2 × 126-cell Sargo batteries; 4 × high-speed Allis-Chalmers electric motors with reduction gears; two propellers; 5,400 shp (4.0 MW) surfaced; 2,740 shp (2.0 MW) submerged
- Speed: 21 kn (39 km/h) surfaced, 9 kn (17 km/h) submerged
- Range: 11,000 nm @ 10 kn (20,000 km @ 19 km/h) surfaced
- Endurance: 48 hours @ 2 kn (3.7 km/h) submerged, 75 days on patrol
- Test depth: 300 ft (90 m)
- Complement: 6 officers, 54 enlisted
- Armament: 10 × 21-inch (533 mm) torpedo tubes; 6 forward, 4 aft; 24 torpedoes; 1 × 3-inch (76 mm) / 50 caliber deck gun; Bofors 40 mm and Oerlikon 20 mm cannon

USS Paddle (SS-263), a Gato-class submarine, was a ship of the United States Navy named for the paddlefish.

== Construction and commissioning ==
Paddle was laid down on 1 May 1942 by the Electric Boat Company at Groton, Connecticut; launched on 30 December 1942, sponsored by Mrs. Goldye S. Fechteler, wife of later Chief of Naval Operations Admiral William M. Fechteler; and commissioned at Naval Submarine Base New London in New London, Connecticut, on 29 March 1943.

== Service history ==
=== United States Navy ===
After trials and training, Paddle left New London on 8 June 1943 for the Panama Canal and Pearl Harbor, Hawaii, arriving on 5 July. She was based at Pearl Harbor during her first two war patrols, between which she trained destroyers in antisubmarine warfare and received meteorological equipment.

Paddle's first patrol, from 20 July to 12 September 1943, was conducted south of Japan. She scored a hit on a large freighter in her first attack on 13 August, but alert escorts forced her down with a 13-hour depth charge attack. Enemy search planes damaged her slightly on 19 August with 7 bombs dropped as she patrolled submerged off the coast of Japan, but she repaired damage quickly and struck back, sinking Ataka Maru on 23 August.

During her second war patrol, from 17 October–9 November, Paddle took station off Nauru to provide continuous weather reporting for the carrier task force attacking the Gilbert and Marshall Islands to cover the Tarawa landings. She also guided, by radio, Army bombers in to raid Tarawa and attacked Nippon Maru off Eniwetok, though escorting destroyers forced her down before she could observe the damage inflicted on the tanker.

After United States West Coast overhaul, Paddle sailed for her third war patrol from Pearl Harbor on 19 March 1944, bound for the Dutch East Indies and the southern Philippines. In a brilliant night attack on 16 April, she sank two of a three-ship convoy guarded by four escorts, torpedoing Mito Maru and Hino Maru No. 1. Breaking off to reload her tubes, Paddle returned to attack a tanker, which had joined the group, and engaged escorting destroyers and aircraft. She ended her patrol at Fremantle, Australia on 12 May.

Paddle's fourth war patrol, from 5 June–29 July, began with reconnaissance of the eastern approaches to Davao Gulf guarding against a Japanese sortie during the U.S. landings on Saipan. Damaged by bombs in the Celebes Sea on 30 June, Paddle repaired quickly and on 6 July attacked a small convoy, twice hitting a large freighter, and sinking Hokaze before being forced down by other escorts.

After refit at Fremantle, Paddle made her fifth patrol, from 22 August–25 September, encountering few contacts in her assigned area in the Sulu Sea. On 7 September, attacked and destroyed the Shinyo Maru and damaged another of her convoy. Shinyo Maru, unmarked as a prisoner of war carrier and unknown to Paddle, was carrying over 750 Allied POWs from the Philippine Islands to Manila when sunk by Paddle. The Japanese crew and patrol boats killed all but 83 of Shinyo Maru's POWs before they could reach shore. One survivor died on shore, one elected to remain in the Philippines and 81 returned home.

She returned to Mios Woendi Lagoon on 25 September 1944 and then prepared for her next patrol, sailing on 3 October for her sixth patrol, engaged in search and rescue duty in the waters off Balikpapan. During brief offensive periods, she sank two oil-laden sea trucks and a schooner by gunfire, then returned to Fremantle on 1 November.

Her seventh war patrol began at Fremantle 25 November and ended at Pearl Harbor on 18 January 1945. Operating mainly in the South China Sea and west of Luzon, Paddle fought through heavy weather to join Hammerhead in sinking Shoei Maru and damaging an enemy destroyer.

After overhaul at San Francisco, Paddle trained at Pearl Harbor whence she sailed on her 8th and last war patrol on 15 May. Prowling the Yellow and East China Seas, she found few substantial targets; by this time submarine attacks had almost annihilated the Japanese merchant marine. She turned her attention to sinking floating mines with gunfire, and sank eight schooners and picket boats.

Returning to Guam 18 July, Paddle sailed on 13 August for lifeguard duty off southern Honshū. With the war's end, she sailed for Midway Atoll on 17 August. The long voyage home ended at Staten Island on 30 September.

=== Brazilian Navy ===
Placed in reserve at New London, Paddle decommissioned on 1 February 1946. She recommissioned on 31 August 1956 to prepare for transfer to Brazil under the Mutual Defense Assistance Program. Decommissioned and transferred on 18 January 1957, she was simultaneously commissioned in the Brazilian Navy as Riachuelo (S-15). Riachuelo was stricken in March 1968 and sunk as a target around 30 June 1968.

== Awards ==
Paddle received eight battle stars for World War II service. Her first seven war patrols were designated "successful."

== See also ==
- List of historical ships of the Brazilian Navy

== Bibliography ==
- Wright, C. C. (2005). "Question 17/03: Replacement of US Submarine Diesel Engines". Warship International. XLII (4): 431–434. ISSN 0043-0374.
