= Subic Bay =

Bay on the west coast of the island of Luzon, Philippines

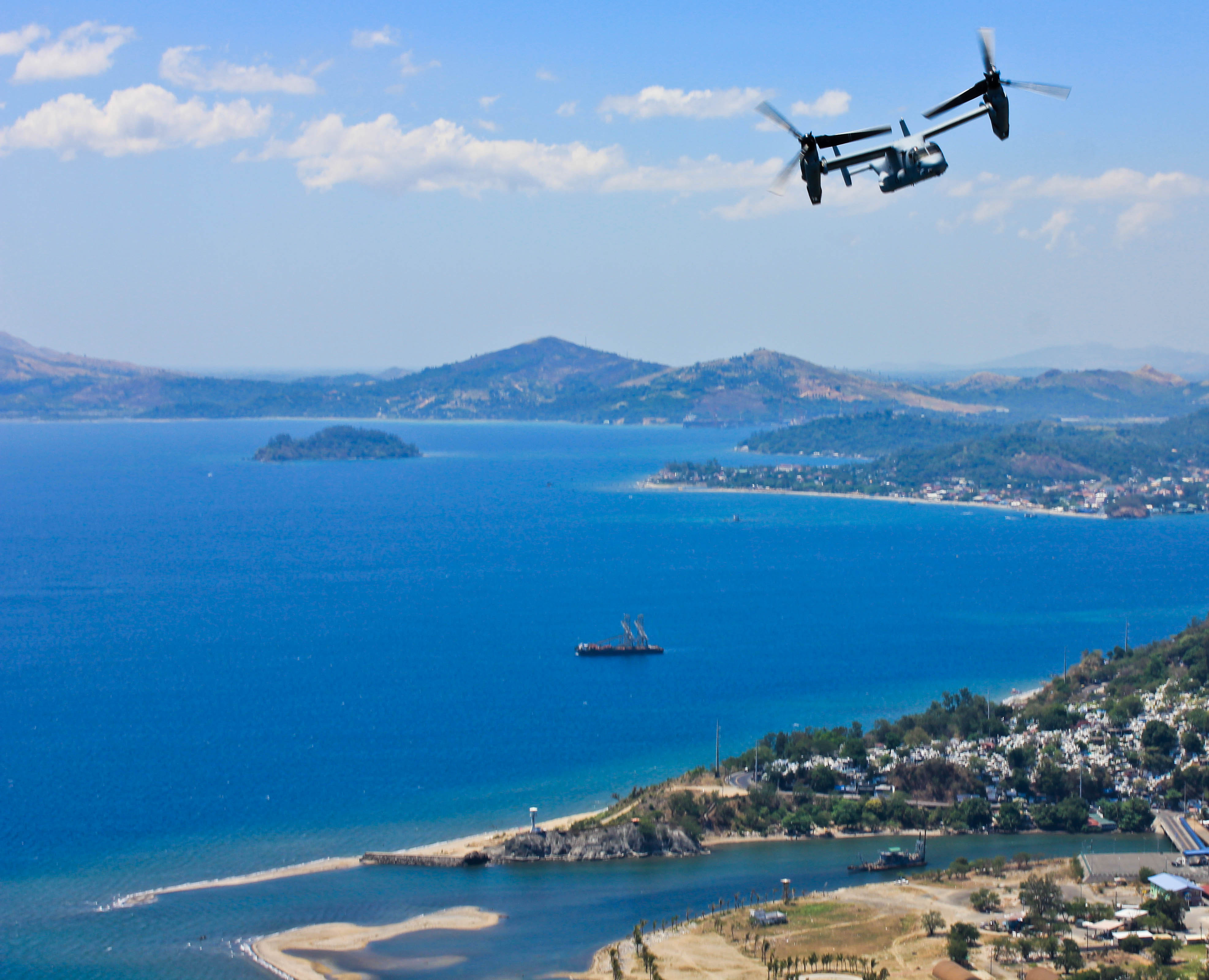

- Location in Luzon Location in the Philippines

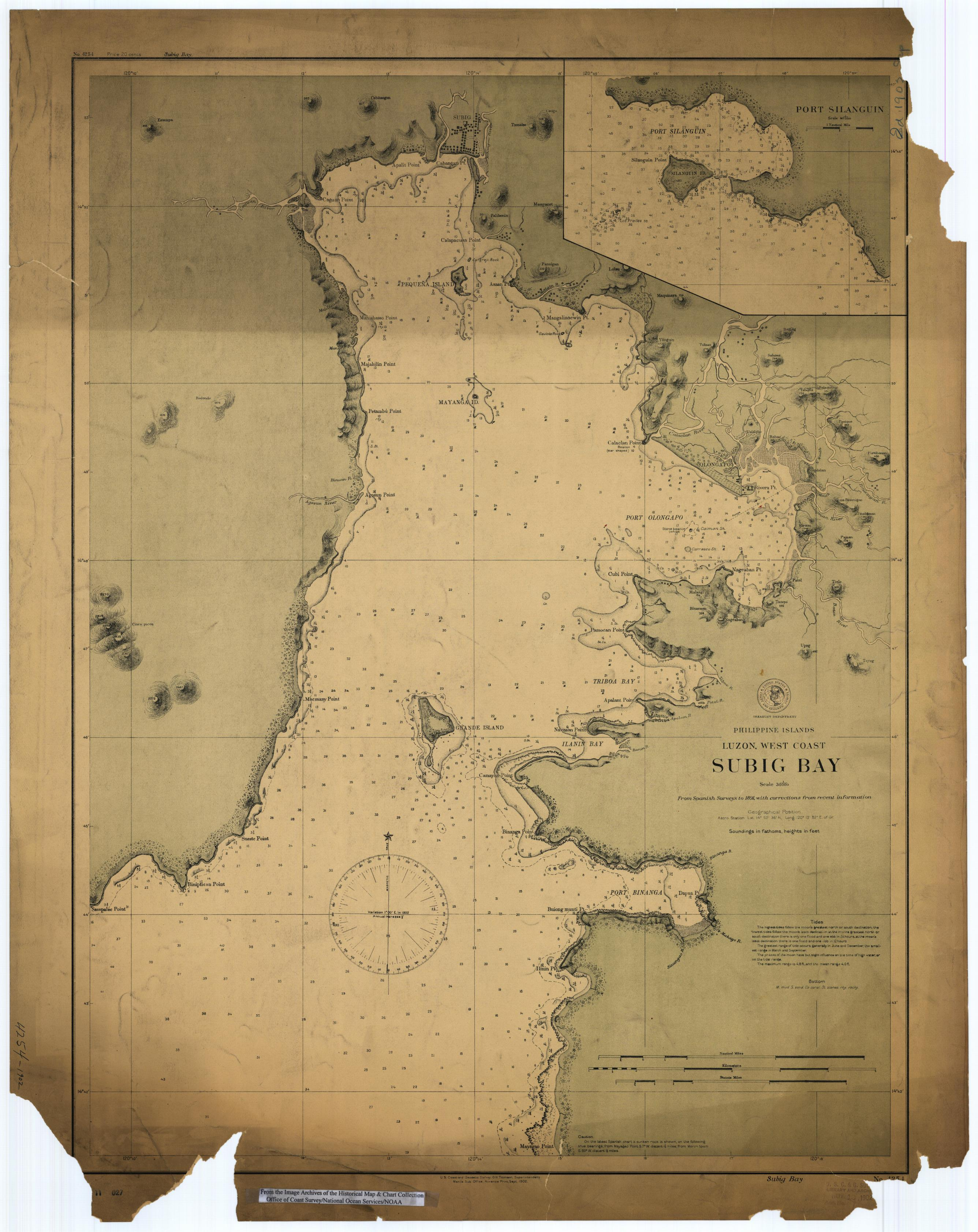
- 1902 nautical chart of Subic Bay
- Location: Luzon Island, Philippines
- Coordinates: 14°47′24″N 120°13′57″E
- Type: bay
- Part of: South China Sea
- Islands: Grande Island
- Settlements: Morong; Olongapo; Subic

Subic Bay is a bay on the west coast of the island of Luzon in the Philippines, about 100 kilometers (62 mi) northwest of Manila Bay. An extension of the South China Sea, its shores were formerly the site of a major United States Navy facility, U.S. Naval Base Subic Bay, now an industrial and commercial area known as the Subic Bay Freeport Zone under the Subic Bay Metropolitan Authority.

Today, water as well as the towns and establishments surrounding the bay are collectively known as Subic Bay. This includes the former naval base, Hanjin shipyard, Olongapo city, the municipal town of Subic, and the erstwhile US defense housing areas of Binictican and Kalayan housing, up to Morong, Bataan.

The bay was long recognized for its deep and protected waters, but development was slow due to lack of level terrain around the bay.

== History ==
In 1542, Spanish conquistador Juan de Salcedo sailed into Subic Bay but no port developed there because the main Spanish naval base would be established in the nearby Manila Bay. When the British captured this base in 1762, the Spanish were forced to find an alternate location and Subic Bay was found to be a strategic and superb port location. In 1884, King Alfonso XII of Spain decreed that Subic was to become "a naval port and the property appertaining thereto set aside for naval purposes."

In the Philippine Revolution the Spanish naval base in Subic was captured by revolutionary Philippine forces, helped by the Cuban-Filipino admiral, Vicente Catalan.

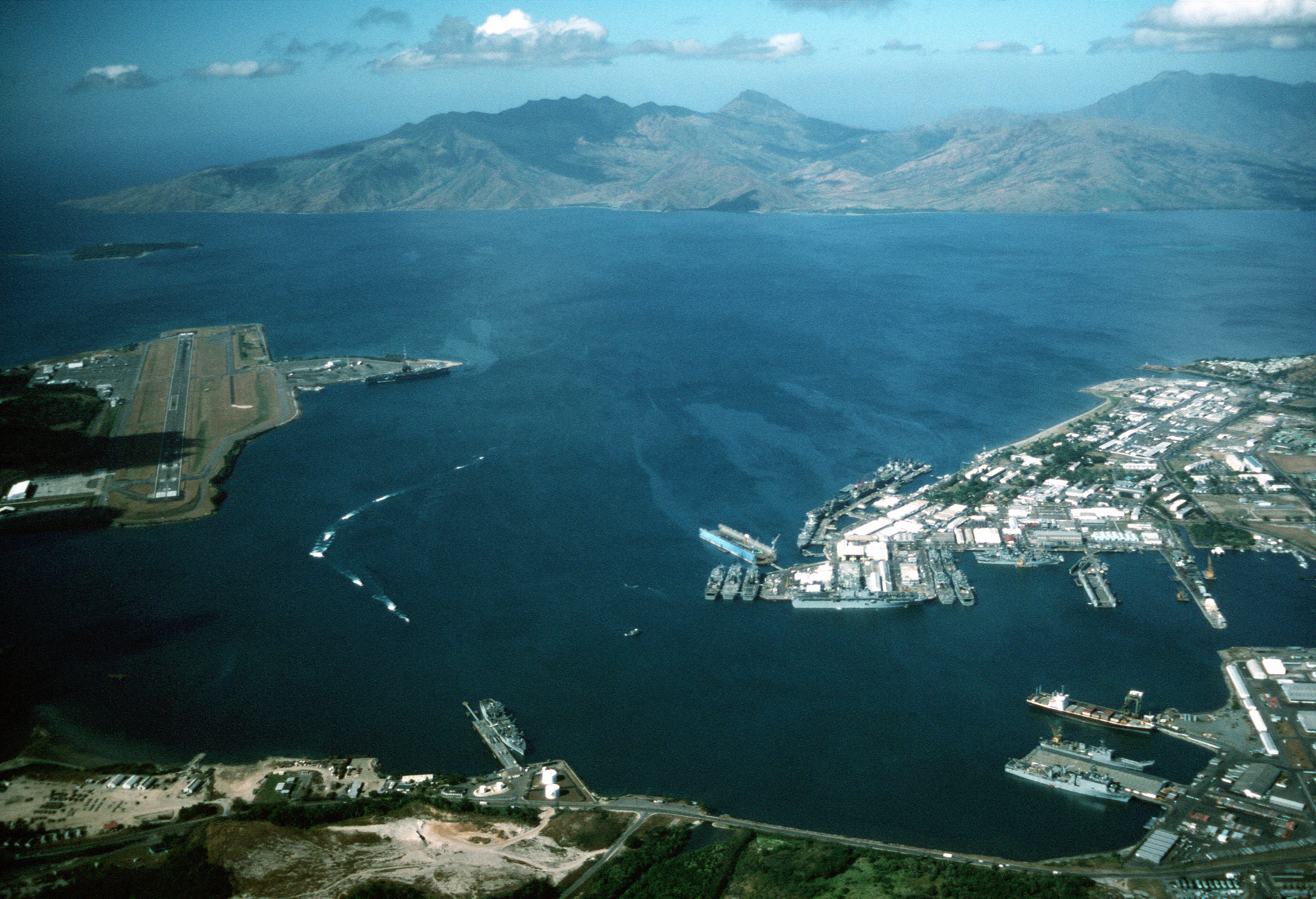
Aerial view of US Naval Base Subic Bay to the right and Naval Air Station Cubi Point to the left in 1990.

The Americans captured the Spanish base in 1899 during the Philippine–American War, and controlled the bay until 1991. During this period, the naval facilities were greatly built up and expanded, including a new naval air station that was built in the early 1950s by slicing the top half from a mountain and moving the soil to reclaim a part of Subic Bay. In 1979, the area under American control was reduced from 24,000 hectares (59,000 acres) to 6,300 hectares (16,000 acres) when the Philippines claimed sovereign rule over the base.

After the 1991 Mount Pinatubo eruption, the Americans closed the base, and the area was transformed into the Subic Bay Freeport Zone.

In 2012, controversy arose when a contracted shipping firm was accused of dumping toxic waste into Subic Bay. MT Glenn Guardian, one of the vessels owned by a Malaysian firm, had collected 189,500 litres (41,700 imp gal; 50,100 US gal) of domestic waste and about 760 litres (170 imp gal; 200 US gal) of bilge water from USS Emory S. Land, a US Navy ship. Since the Malaysian firm was contracted by the US Navy, albeit with Philippine approval, the incident ignited anti-American sentiments in the Philippines from a militant group.

== Pamulaklakin Nature Park ==
The Pamulaklakin Nature Park is a reserve area of Binictican. Part of the 11,000 hectares of forest is at Subic Bay. The Subic Bay Metropolitan Authority created the park to supplement the income of the indigenous people. The term "Pamulaklakin" derives from a word for an herbal vine in the native Ambala language.

== Shipwrecks of Subic Bay ==
The majority of the wrecks in Subic Bay are a result of either the Spanish–American War in 1898 or of World War II, when American aircraft sank a number of Japanese vessels.

- El Capitan (former USS Majaba) was a freighter of nearly 3,000 tons just under 130 meters (427 ft) long. In 1946, she sank in Subic Bay where she rests on a sloping bottom.
- Hell ship Oryoku Maru: On 15 December 1944, she had 1,619 American, British and Czech prisoners of war on board when she was sunk under heavy bombardment by American fighters while on her way from Subic Bay to Japan. She was less than half a kilometer off the Alava Pier when attacked. About 300 prisoners died during the short voyage from Manila and during the attack.
- Seian Maru: During an air raid on Subic Bay, the 3,712-ton freighter Seian Maru was bombed and sunk. This was only four days after the sinking of Oryoku Maru on 19 December 1944.
- Landing Ship, Tank LST-559: She was scuttled in the middle of Subic Bay between the runway's southern tip and Grande Island.
- The old USS New York, which had been renamed USS Rochester in 1917. At the onset of the Japanese invasion of the Philippines, this ship was acting as a floating workshop and storehouse. The decommissioned cruiser's armored hull was considered too valuable to allow Japanese forces to capture it, so American forces scuttled the ship in December 1941.
- San Quentin: During the Spanish–American War in 1898, the Spanish scuttled their San Quintín (now often called San Quentin) in hopes of blocking the passage between Grande Island and Chiquita Islands near the mouth of Subic Bay.
- USS Lanikai, a schooner-rigged diesel powered yacht that served in the U.S. Navy during both World War I and World War II before being transferred to the Royal Australian Navy.
- Japanese auxiliary minesweeper Banshu Maru No. 52
- Japanese subchaser Kyo Maru No. 11 sunk by U.S. Army Air Forces Curtiss P-40 Warhawks on 2 March 1942 during the Battle of Bataan.
- Unidentified Japanese patrol boat: although some sources identify this wreck as the Japanese converted gunboat Aso Maru, Japanese and American naval sources indicate that the Aso Maru was torpedoed and sunk on 9 May 1943 by the US submarine USS Gar off Negros Island's south-west coast.
- The USS Frank E. Evans was decommissioned at Subic Bay and stricken from the Naval Vessel Register on 1 July 1969 after a collision with HMAS Melbourne. The stern section was sunk as a target in Subic Bay on 10 October 1969.

== See also ==
- Port of Subic
- Subic Bay International Airport
- Subic, Zambales
