= Enoura Maru =

Japanese cargo ship and troop transport

History

Empire of Japan
- Name: Enoura Maru
- Fate: Disabled by bombing. Scrapped post war 22.6166°N 120.25°E

General characteristics
- Type: Transport
- Tonnage: 6968 t

Enoura Maru was a Japanese cargo ship used by the Imperial Japanese Navy during World War II as a troop transport and prisoner of war (POW) transport ship. Japanese POW transport ships are referred to as hell ships, due to the overcrowded and unsanitary conditions and the many deaths that occurred on board. On 9 January 1945, while docked at the port of Takao in Formosa and loaded with Allied prisoners of war who had survived the earlier sinking of Ōryoku Maru, it was attacked by Allied aircraft resulting in the deaths of approximately 400 Allied POWs.

The Enoura Maru was permanently disabled by the air raid, but was hit again by United States Army Air Forces planes at Takao on 26 March 1945 and declared sunk. The ship actually survived afloat at the Takao dockside until the end of the war.
