= Ōryoku Maru =

Japanese ship (sunk 1944)

Coordinates: 14.813201°N 120.284961°E

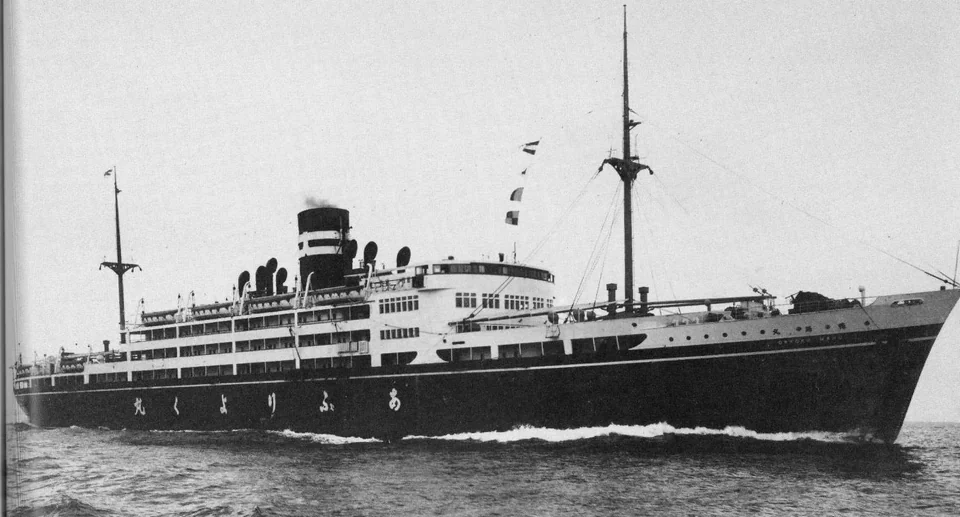
- Ōryoku Maru

History

Empire of Japan
- Name: Ōryoku Maru
- Namesake: Yalu River
- Fate: Sunk, Subic Bay, Philippines December 15, 1944

General characteristics
- Type: Transport
- Tonnage: 7365 t
- Length: 387.139 ft (118.m)
- Beam: 57.08 ft (17.4 m)
- Draught: 34.44 ft (10.5 m)
- Propulsion: 4 x steam turbines, 2 x propellers
- Speed: 18 knots

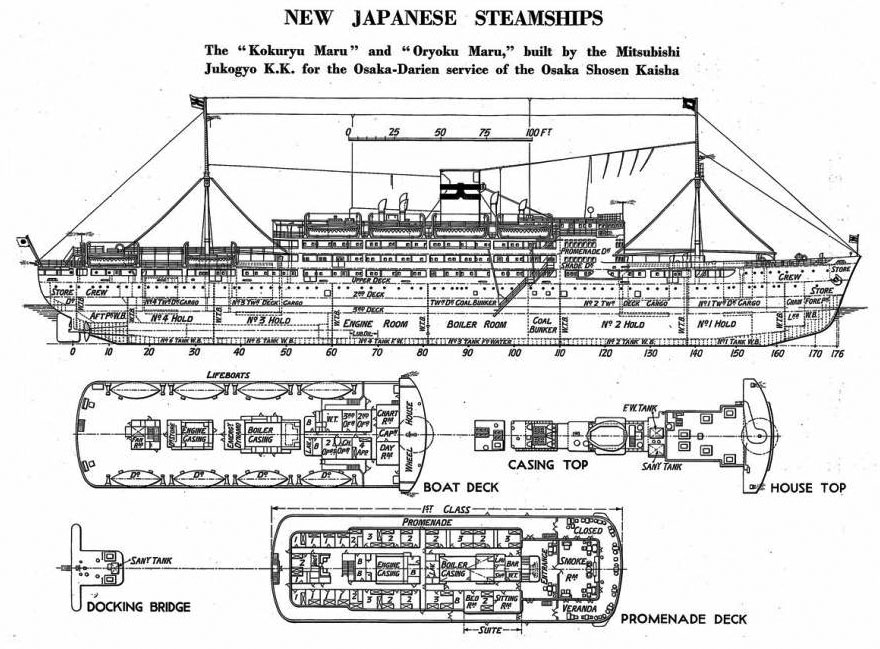
A Floor-Plan For the S.S. Ōryoku Maru Ships

Ōryoku Maru (鴨緑丸; named after Yalu River) was a Japanese passenger cargo ship which was commissioned by the Imperial Japanese Navy during World War II as a troop transport and prisoner of war (POW) transport ship. Japanese POW transport ships are often referred to as hell ships, due to their notoriously unpleasant conditions and the many deaths that occurred on board. In December 1944, the ship was bombed by American aircraft, killing 200 Allied POWs. Hundreds more died in the months that followed.

== Sinking ==
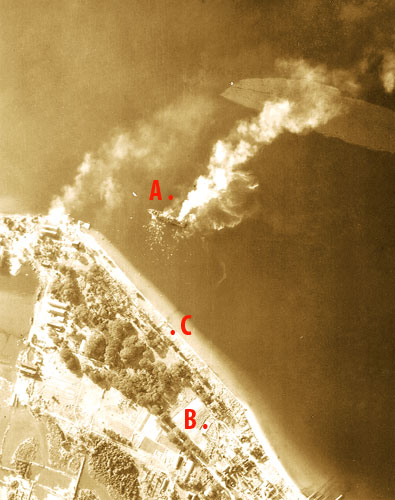
Oryoku burning after attack on 15 December 1944 about 11 AM. Photo by a Hellcat from USS Hornet shows POWs swimming in the water.

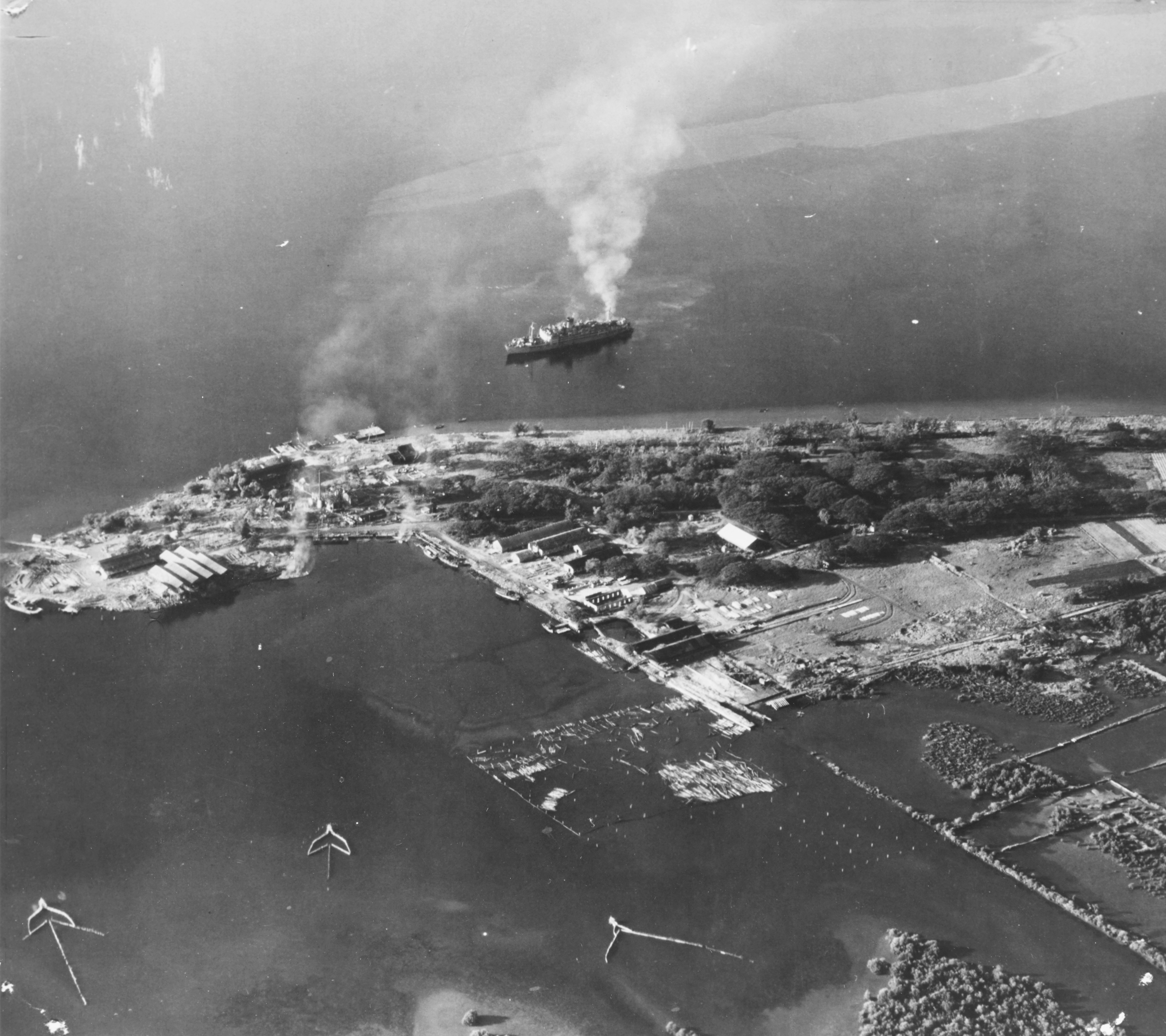
Oryoku burning on 15 December 1944.

Oryoku Maru left Manila on December 13, 1944, with 1,620 prisoners of war (including 1,556 American, 50 British and Dutch, 7 Czech, 4 Norwegians and several other nationalities) packed in the holds, and 1,900 Japanese civilians and military personnel in the cabins. As she neared the naval base at Olongapo in Subic Bay, US Navy planes from USS Hornet attacked the unmarked ship, causing it to sink on December 15. About 270 died aboard ship. Some died from suffocation or dehydration. Others were killed in the attack, drowned or were shot while escaping the ship as it sank in Subic Bay where the 'Hell Ship Memorial' is located. A colonel, in his official report, wrote:

Many men lost their minds and crawled about in the absolute darkness armed with knives, attempting to kill people in order to drink their blood or armed with canteens filled with urine and swinging them in the dark. The hold was so crowded and everyone so interlocked with one another that the only movement possible was over the heads and bodies of others.

== Experience of the survivors ==
The survivors of the sinking were held for several days in an open tennis court at Olongapo Naval Base. While there, the prisoners were afforded no sanitary conditions whatsoever. Prisoners experienced severe mistreatment, and several deaths occurred. The group of prisoners was then moved to San Fernando, Pampanga. While in San Fernando, 15 weak or wounded prisoners were loaded on a truck, believing they would be taken to Bilibid Prison for treatment. In the 1946 war crimes trial, they were reported to have been taken to a nearby cemetery, beheaded, and dumped into a mass grave. The remaining prisoners were then transported by train to San Fernando, La Union. There, about 1,000 of the survivors were loaded on another Japanese ship, Enoura Maru, while the rest boarded the smaller Brazil Maru. Both ships reached Takao (Kaohsiung) harbor in Taiwan on New Year's Day 1944.

On January 6, the smaller group of prisoners was transferred from Brazil Maru to Enoura Maru, and 37 British and Dutch were taken ashore. However, on January 9, Enoura Maru was bombed and disabled while in harbor, killing about 350 men. The survivors were put aboard Brazil Maru which arrived in Moji, Japan, on January 29, 1945. Only 550 of the over 900 who sailed from Taiwan were still alive; 150 more men died in Japan, Taiwan, and Korea in the following months, leaving only 403 survivors of the original 1,620 to be liberated from camps in Kyushu, Korea, Manchuria, and Taiwan in August and September 1945.

== Aftermath ==
Junsaburo Toshino, former lieutenant and Guard Commandant aboard the ship, was found guilty of murdering and supervising the murder of at least 16 men, and sentenced to death as a Class B war criminal at Yokohama. Shuske Wada, whose charges paralleled those of Toshino, was the official interpreter for the guard group. (Both Toshino and Wada had supervised the San Fernando murders.) Wada was found guilty of causing the deaths of numerous American and Allied prisoners of war by neglecting to transmit to his superiors requests for adequate quarters, food, drinking water, and medical attention. Wada was sentenced to life imprisonment at hard labor. All the other guards received long prison sentences. The captain of the ship, Shin Kajiyama, was acquitted, "as he had no chance to prevent any atrocities".

Toshino was hanged at Sugamo Prison on August 18, 1948.

== Painting ==
Kihachiro Ueda, who painted many Japanese ships, donated his painting of the ship to Subic Bay Historical Center for its hell ship memorial.

== See also ==
- List of Japanese hell ships
