= Hell ship =

Japanese ships infamous for poor treatment

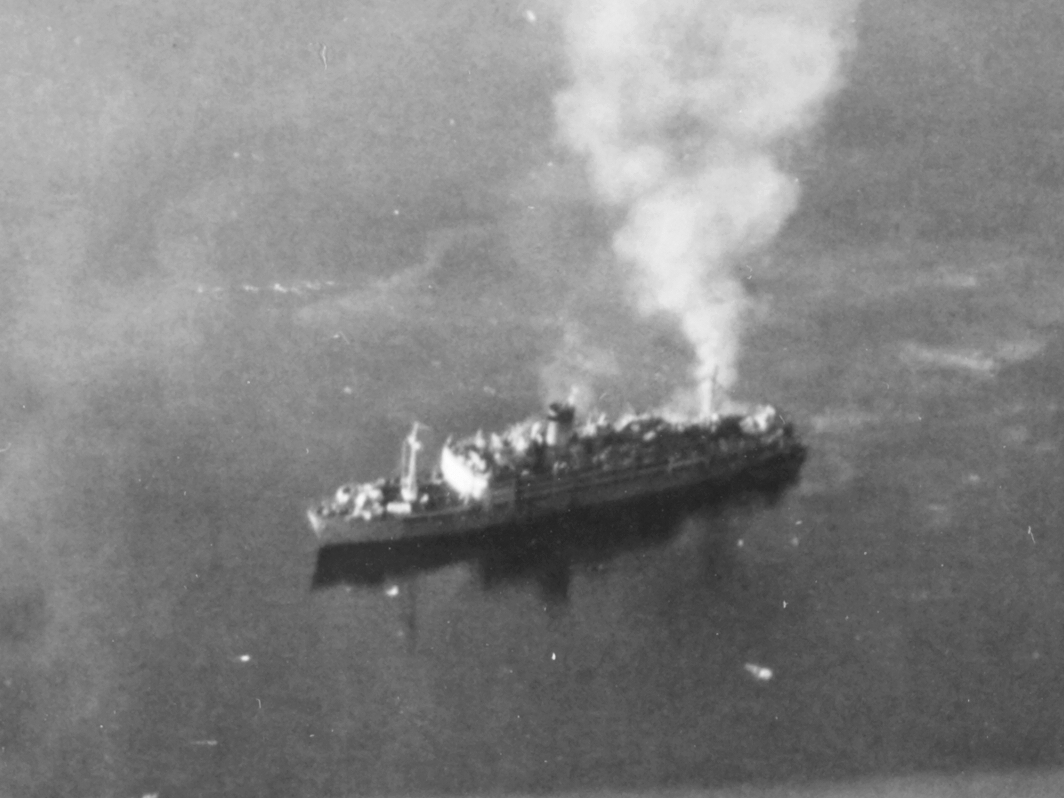
Oryoku Maru in World War II

Hell ship is a term for a ship with extremely inhumane living conditions or with a reputation for cruelty among the crew. It now generally refers to the ships used by the Imperial Japanese Navy and Imperial Japanese Army to transport Allied prisoners of war (POWs) and rōmusha (Asian forced slave laborers) out of the Philippines, the Dutch East Indies, Hong Kong, and Singapore in World War II. These POWs were taken to the Japanese Islands, Formosa, Manchukuo, Korea, the Moluccas, Sumatra, Burma, or Siam to be used as forced labor.

== Etymology ==
During the American Revolutionary War, Patriot prisoners of war sometimes referred to British prison ships they were held in using the terms "hell" and "hell ship". Captured Patriot military personnel who refused to swear allegiance to the Crown during the conflict were kept by the British in prison ships, many of which were aging and dilapidated warships. Conditions onboard these ships were frequently abysmal, and outbreaks of diseases such as dysentery were rife among prisoners. The most infamous prison ship was HMS Jersey, which was designed to hold a complement of 400 crewmen but held up to 1,000 prisoners of war during the conflict; when the war ended in 1783, it was abandoned and burnt in New York Harbor.

During World War II, the term "hell ship" was revived by Allied prisoners of war (POWs) to refer to merchant vessels requisitioned by the Empire of Japan to transport POWs and forced labourers to various locations under Japanese control. According to American historian Gregory F. Michno, during World War II 134 Japanese "hell ships" transported roughly 126,000 Allied POWs via more than 156 voyages. During the war, the Japanese engaged in the widespread use of forced labour, including from Allied POWs, to produce the vast quantities of materials needed to maintain military operations. As such, these ships were used to transfer POWs to areas where they would forcibly produce material for Japan's war effort.

Conditions onboard these vessels were abysmal, with passengers being frequently denied access to adequate food, drink and bathroom facilities while being placed into cramped conditions. Terminal dehydration, hyperthermia and starvation along with summary executions and excessive beatings led to the death of some, though the greatest cause of fatalities for POWs aboard these ships were Allied attacks, which unintentionally killed thousands of passengers. The United States Navy carried out most of these attacks with the help of Allied intelligence services and the Royal Navy's British Pacific Fleet.

The term "hell ship" was also used by the British press to refer to ships used by Nazi Germany to transport Allied POWs, such as the oil tanker Altmark. The ship was transporting 300 British sailors picked up after being on merchant ships sunk by the Kriegsmarine cruiser Admiral Graf Spee when it was boarded by the Royal Navy destroyer HMS Cossack, which rescued the sailors. When describing the rescue, which came to be known as the Altmark incident, British newspapers frequently described Altmark with epithets such as "Hitler's hell-ship" or the "Nazi hell-ship".

== Japanese hell ships ==
In May 1942, the Japanese began transferring its captured POWs by sea. Prisoners were often crammed into cargo holds with little air, ventilation, food, or water, for journeys that would last weeks. Many died due to asphyxia, starvation or dysentery. Some POWs became delirious and unresponsive in their environment of heat, humidity and lack of oxygen, food, and water. These transports carried a mixture of POWs and regular Japanese troops and cargo, and thus were not eligible to be marked as non-combatants. As a result, such vessels could be attacked by Allied submarines and aircraft, meaning they were at risk of being sunk before they reached their destination. More than 20,000 Allied POWs died at sea when the transport ships carrying them were attacked by Allied submarines and aircraft.

== List of ships sunk ==
=== Arisan Maru ===
On October 24, 1944, the Arisan Maru was transporting 1,781 U.S. and Allied military and civilian POWs when it was hit by a torpedo from a U.S. submarine (either USS Shark or USS Snook), at about 5:00 p.m.; it finally sank about 7:00 p.m. No POWs were killed by the torpedo strikes, and nearly all were able to escape from the ship's holds, but the Japanese did not attempt to rescue any of them from the sea. Only nine of the prisoners aboard survived the event. Five escaped and made their way to China in one of the ship's two life boats. They were reunited with U.S. forces and returned to the United States. The remaining four were later recaptured by Imperial Japanese naval vessels, with one of them dying shortly after they reached land.

=== Brazil Maru ===
Survivors of the Oryoku Maru, which sank on 15 December 1944, were loaded on the Enoura Maru and the Brazil Maru. Both ships reached Takao (Kaohsiung) harbor in Taiwan on New Year's Day. On 6 January 1945, the smaller group of prisoners were transferred from Brazil Maru to Enoura Maru. However, on January 9, the Enoura Maru was bombed and disabled by U.S. aircraft. Brazil Maru transported the last surviving Allied POWs to Moji, Japan, on 29 January 1945. There the Japanese medics were shocked at the wasted condition of the POWs and used triage to divide them. The 110 most severe cases were taken to a primitive military hospital in Kokura where 73 died within a month. Four other groups were sent to Fukuoka POW camps 1, 3, 4 and 17. Of 549 men alive when the ship docked, only 372 survived the war. Some eventually went to a POW camp in Jinsen, Korea, where they were given light duty, mainly sewing garments for the Japanese Army.

=== Buyo Maru ===
Buyo Maru was a 5,446 ton Yoshida Maru No.1-class transport carrying mainly Indian POWs. It was torpedoed by USS Wahoo (SS-238), commanded by CDR Dudley W. Morton, on 26 January 1943. Morton then ordered the ship's lifeboats to be fired upon with small arms fire. The Hague Convention of 1907 bans the killing of shipwreck survivors under any circumstances. Morton and his executive officer Richard O'Kane also reported that they had misidentified the survivors as Japanese. O'Kane further explained that the fire from Wahoo was intended to force the troops to abandon their boats and no troops were deliberately targeted. Vice Admiral Charles A. Lockwood, the Commander of the Submarine Force for the U.S. Pacific Fleet (COMSUBPAC), asserted that the survivors were army troops and turned machine gun and rifle fire on Wahoo while she maneuvered on the surface and that such resistance was common in submarine warfare. It was reported that many of the lifeboat occupants were Indian POWs of the 2nd Battalion, 16th Punjab Regiment, plus escorts from the Japanese 26th Field Ordnance Depot. Of 1,126 men aboard Buyo Maru, 195 Indians and 87 Japanese died in all, between the shooting incident and the initial sinking, (the exact number of dead varied according to sources). On the next day, 27 January 1943, the Choku Maru (No. 2) rescued the remaining survivors and took them to Palau.

=== Enoura Maru ===
About 1,000 of the survivors of the Oryoku Maru, which sank on 15 December 1944, were loaded on the Enoura Maru while the rest boarded the smaller Brazil Maru. Both ships reached Takao (Kaohsiung) harbor in Taiwan on New Year's Day. On 6 January 1945, the smaller group of prisoners was transferred from Brazil Maru to Enoura Maru, and 37 British and Dutch were taken ashore. However, on January 9, the Enoura Maru was bombed and disabled by aircraft from USS Hornet while in harbor, killing about 350 men.

=== Hofuku Maru ===
The Hofuku Maru, also known as Hohuku Maru (豊福丸 (Kyūjitai: 豐福丸), Hōfuku Maru), was a Japanese cargo ship, sunk on 21 September 1944 by American aircraft, while carrying 1,289 British and Dutch prisoners of war; 1,047 of them died.

=== Jun'yō Maru ===
The 5,065-ton tramp steamer Jun'yō Maru sailed from Tandjoeng Priok (Batavia) on 16 September 1944 with about 4,200 romusha slave labourers and 2,300 POWs aboard. These Dutch POWs included 1,600 from the 10th Battalion camp and 700 from the Kampong Makassar camp. This 23rd transport of POWs from Java was called Java Party 23. Java Party 23 included about 6,500 men bound for Padang on the west coast of Sumatra to work on the Sumatra Railway (Mid-Sumatra). On 18 September 1944 the ship was 15 miles off the west coast of Sumatra near Benkoelen when HMS Tradewind hit her with two torpedoes, one in the bow and one in the stern. About 4,000 romushas and 1,626 POWs died when the ship sank in 20 minutes. About 200 romushas and 674 POWs were rescued by Japanese ships and taken to the prison in Padang, where eight prisoners died.

=== Kachidoki Maru ===
On 12 September 1944, SS Kachidoki Maru with 950 British POWs on board, was sunk by USS Pampanito. 431 of them were killed. Kachidoki Maru was traveling in a convoy with Rakuyo Maru (see below), which was sunk the same day by USS Sealion.

=== Lisbon Maru ===
Lisbon Maru was carrying 2,000 British POWs from Hong Kong to Japan in appalling conditions when torpedoed by USS Grouper on 1 October 1942. 800 POWs died when the ship sank the following day. Many were shot or otherwise killed by the ship's Japanese guards.

=== Maros Maru ===
The 600-ton Maros Maru (The SS Maros was renamed Haruyoshi Maru by the Japanese) sailed from Ambon on 17 September 1944 routed along the south-coast of Celebes with about 500 British and Dutch POWs bound for Surabaya. On 21 September 1944 the ship arrived at Muna Island (south of Celebes) to embark 150 POWs. The ship required engine repairs upon arrival in Makassar. Here 159 POWs died in the holds in the 40 days required to complete repairs. They got a seaman's grave in the harbour of Makassar. Only 327 POWs survived when the ship reached Surabaya on 26 November 1944. They were transported by train to the Kampong Makassar camp in Batavia (Meester Cornelis), and arrived on 28 November 1944.

=== Montevideo Maru ===
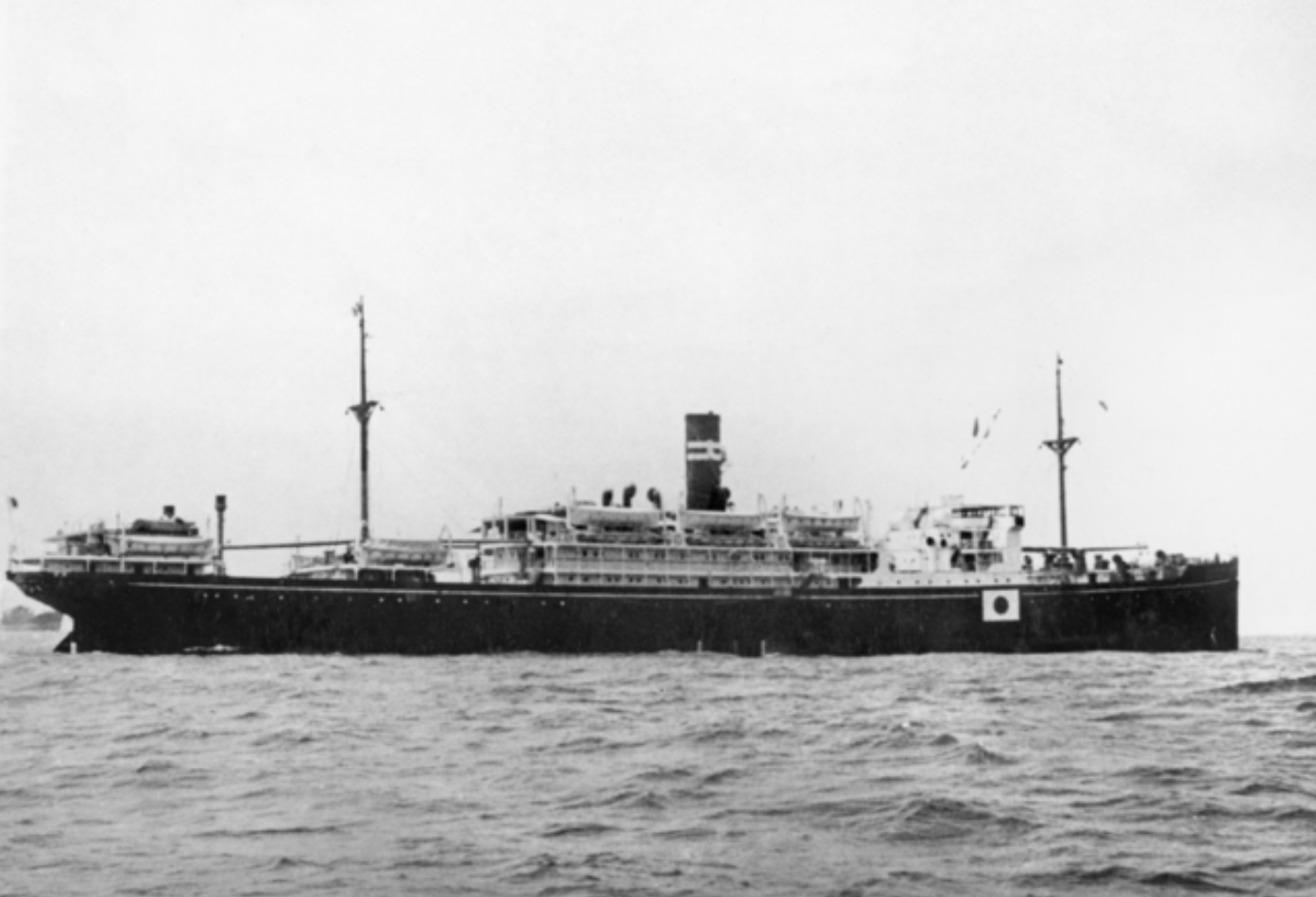
Montevideo Maru c. 1941

Montevideo Maru was a Japanese auxiliary ship that was sunk in World War II by the submarine USS Sturgeon, resulting in the drowning of 1,054 Australian prisoners of war and civilians being transported from Rabaul. Prior to the war, it operated as a passenger and cargo vessel, traveling mainly between Asia and South America.

=== Oryoku Maru ===
Oryoku Maru was a 7,363-ton passenger cargo liner transporting 1,620 survivors of the Bataan Death March, Corregidor, and other battles, mostly American, packed in the holds, and 1,900 Japanese civilians and military personnel in the cabins. She left Manila on 13 December 1944, and over the next two days was bombed and strafed by U.S. airplanes. As she neared the naval base at Olongapo in Subic Bay, U.S. Navy planes from USS Hornet attacked the unmarked ship, causing it to sink on December 15. About 270 died aboard the ship. Some died from suffocation or dehydration. Others were killed in the attack, drowned or were shot while escaping the ship as it sank in Subic Bay, where the 'Hell Ship Memorial' is located. A colonel, in his official report, wrote:

Many men lost their minds and crawled about in the absolute darkness armed with knives, attempting to kill people in order to drink their blood or armed with canteens filled with urine and swinging them in the dark. The hold was so crowded and everyone so interlocked with one another that the only movement possible was over the heads and bodies of others.

=== Rakuyo Maru ===
Rakuyo Maru was torpedoed on 12 September 1944 by USS Sealion which later realized the ship carried 1,317 Australian and British prisoners of war from Singapore to Formosa (Taiwan). A total of 1,159 POWs died. The 350 who were in lifeboats were bombarded and all killed by a Japanese navy vessel the next day when they were rowing towards land. On 15 September, Sealion, along with USS Growler and USS Pampanito, returned to the area and rescued 63 surviving POWs who were on rafts. Four of them died before they could be landed at Tanapag Harbor, Saipan, in the Mariana Islands. Rakuyo Maru was travelling in a convoy with SS Kachidoki Maru (see above), which was sunk the same day by Pampanito.

=== Shinyo Maru ===
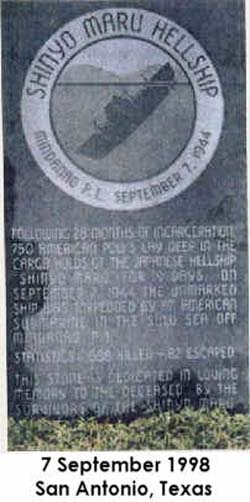
The "Hell Ship" plaque in San Antonio, Texas dedicated on the 54th anniversary of the SS Shinyo Maru incident.

Shinyo Maru was attacked by the submarine USS Paddle on 7 September 1944. Two torpedo hits sank the ship and killed several hundred US, Dutch and Filipino servicemen. Japanese guarding the prisoners opened fire on them while they were trying to abandon ship or swim to the nearby island of Mindanao. 47 Japanese and 687 Allied POWs were killed.

=== Suez Maru ===
Suez Maru was a 4,645-ton freighter with passenger accommodation. She sailed on 25 November 1943 with 548 POWs (415 British and 133 Dutch) from Ambon bound for Surabaya. The POWs were all sick men from the work-camps on the Moluccas and Ambon. Twenty were stretcher cases. On 29 November 1943 the ship was torpedoed by USS Bonefish near Kangean Island east of Madoera Island. Most of the POWs drowned in the holds of the ship. The crew of Bonefish was unaware that Suez Maru was carrying POWs. Those who escaped from the holds and left the ship were shot by the Japanese. Minesweeper W-12 picked up the Japanese survivors although recently released documents state that W-12 machine-gunned the surviving POWs (a minimum of 250) in the water. There were no POW survivors.

== Wreck discoveries ==
In 2026, the wreck of the Hōfuku Maru was identified in more than 160 feet of water off the coast of Zambales province in Central Luzon, Philippines, more than 80 years after the vessel sank in September 1944. The discovery was made by explorer Josh Gates working alongside the Hellships Memorial Foundation, maritime archaeologist Dr. Calvin Mires of Marine Imaging Technologies, and underwater imaging specialist Evan Kovacs.

The team used sonar to locate an uncharted wreck in their search area before conducting a series of deepwater dives to photograph and document the site. Using photogrammetry, researchers produced a three-dimensional model of the wreck, which was found split into two sections, consistent with both American and Japanese historical accounts of the sinking. The vessel's dimensions, mast positions, and cargo hold configuration were compared against original blueprints of the Hōfuku Maru and found to match. Human remains were discovered among the debris, identifying the site as a war grave containing the remains of more than 1,000 Allied prisoners of war.

A digitized Japanese document discovered in June 2025 by researcher John Duresky proved instrumental in narrowing the search area. Written by officers aboard the convoy's lead ship, the document included a timeline and map indicating the position of the Hōfuku Maru at the time it was struck.

The discovery is set to be presented in the two-part season premiere of the television series Expedition Unknown, titled "Hunt for the Hellships," scheduled to air on the Discovery Channel on June 24, 2026.

== Media appearances ==
In 2012 film producer Jan Thompson created a film documentary on the hell ships, Death March, and POW camps titled Never the Same: The Prisoner-of-War Experience. The film reproduced scenes of the camps and ships, showed drawings and writings of the prisoners, and featured Loretta Swit as the narrator. The Midnight Oil song In the Valley mentions the sinking of Montevideo Maru, where the narrator's grandfather drowned: "the Rising Sun sent him floating to his rest".

== See also ==
- List of Japanese hell ships
- Slave ship
- Prison ship
- SS Arandora Star
- RMS Nova Scotia — a British liner sunk in November 1942 while carrying interned Italian civilians and prisoners of war
- SS Shuntien (1934)
- Laconia incident
