= List of Japanese hell ships =

This list of Japanese hell ships encompasses those vessels used for transporting Allied prisoners of war during the Pacific War.

== Select list ==
The names of the Japanese hell ships used during World War II includes some variants which are different names referring to the same ship.

- Aikoku Maru
- Aki Maru (Japanese Kyūjitai: 安藝丸, Shinjitai: 安芸丸)
- Akikaze
- Akizuki
- Amagi Maru
- Anami Maru
- Aramis (aka Teia Maru)
- Argentina Maru
- Arisan Maru – sunk by USS Shark or USS Snook 24 October 1944. 1,773 U.S. POWs killed.
- Asaka Maru - left Keppel Harbour, Singapore, on 4 July 1944. Wrecked in a storm between Luzon and Formosa. Survivors were rescued by two Japanese navy destroyers, and boarded the Hakusan Maru which arrived in Moji, Kyushu, on 28 August 1944. According to the personal account of a British soldier who was on this voyage, the Asaka Maru was old and built in Glasgow.
- Asama Maru – sunk by USS Atule 1 November 1944. No POWs aboard. (Note: Formerly in the fleet of N.Y.K Lines)
- Awa Maru – sunk by USS Queenfish 1 April 1945. No POWs aboard.
- Benjo Maru Almost certainly a fictitious or derisive name as it means toilet in Japanese, 便所.
- Brazil Maru (Note: Formerly in the fleet of O.S.K. Lines) – bombed 15 December 1944. No POWs aboard.
- Burong
- Buyo Maru
- Celebes Maru
- Chichibu Maru – sunk by USS Gudgeon 28 April 1943. No POWs aboard.
- Cho Saki Maru
- Chuka Maru
- Chuyo – sunk by USS Sailfish 4 December 1943. 20 of the 21 POWs aboard died.
- Clyde Maru
- Coral Maru
- Dai Moji Maru
- Dai Nichi Maru
- Daikeku Maru
- Dainichi Maru
- England Maru
- Enoshima Maru
- Enoura Maru – sunk by Allied aircraft on 9 January 1945, resulting in the deaths of approximately 400 Allied POWs.
- Enuri Maru
- Erie Maru
- France Maru
- Fuji Maru
- Fukkai Maru
- Fuku Maru
- Fukuji Maru
- Fukuju Maru
- Hakuroku Maru
- Hakusan Maru – sunk by USS Flier 4 June 1944. No POWs aboard.
- Hakushika Maru
- Haru Maru
- Harugiku Maru (治菊丸, formerly Van Waerwijck – sunk by HMS Truculent 26 June 1944, 180 of 720 POWs and 27 of 55 Japanese troops killed.
- Haruyasa Maru
- Hawaii Maru (はわい丸, Hawai Maru)
- Heiyo Maru
- Hioki Maru
- Hiyoki Maru
- Hofuku Maru – sunk on 21 September 1944 by American aircraft, while carrying 1,289 British and Dutch POWs. 1,047 of them died.
- Hokko Maru
- Hokusen Maru (北鮮丸)
- Hozan Maru
- Ikoma Maru – sunk on 21 January 1944 by USS Seahorse. 418 of 611 Indian POWs aboard were killed.
- Ikuta Maru
- Imabari Maru (formerly De Klerk)
- Interisland Steamer
- Junyō Maru – torpedoed 18 November 1944 with loss of over 5,000 lives, including 1,300 POWs
- Kachidoki Maru – sunk by Pampanito on 12 September 1944. Of 900 POWs, 400 perished. The remaining were transferred to the Kibitsu Maru and taken on to Japan
- Kaishun Maru
- Kaiun Maru
- Kakko Maru
- Kalgan Maru
- Kamakura Maru – sunk by USS Gudgeon on 28 April 1943. No POWs aboard.
- Kenkon Maru (乾坤丸)
- Kenwa Maru
- Kenzan Maru
- Kiaota Maru
- Kibitzu Maru
- Kohho Maru
- Kokusei Maru
- Konosue Maru
- Koryu Maru
- Kōshū Maru – sunk by USS Ray on 4 August 1944. 1,239 out of 1,513 POWs, most of them Javanese labourers, died.
- Kunishima Maru
- Kurimata Maru
- Kyokko Maru
- Kyokusei Maru
- Lima Maru
- Lisbon Maru (りすぼん丸, Risubon Maru) – sunk by Grouper on 2 October 1944. Of the 1,816 British POWs, 842 perished.
- Maebashi Maru (前橋丸, Maebashi Maru)
- Makassar Maru
- Maros Maru
- Maru Go (5)
- Maru Hachi (8)
- Maru Ichi (1)
- Maru Ni (2)
- Maru No. 760
- Maru Roku
- Maru San (3)
- Maru Shi (4)
- Maru Shichi (7)
- Mati Mati Maru
- Matsu Maru
- Matti Matti Maru
- Maya Maru
- Mayebassi Maru
- Melbourne Maru
- Mishima Maru
- Miyo Maru
- Moji Maru
- Montevideo Maru (もんてびでお丸, Montebideo Maru) – sunk by Sturgeon on 1 July 1942. all 1,054 Australian POWs and civilians died.
- Nagara Maru
- Nagata Maru
- Nagato Maru
- Nanshin Maru
- Naruto Maru
- Natoru Maru
- Nichimei Maru – Sunk on 15 January 1943 by U.S. aircraft, transporting 1,500 Japanese troops and 965 Dutch POWs of which 32 POWs died.
- Nishi Maru
- Nissyo Maru
- Nitikoku Maru
- Nitimei Maru
- Nitta Maru
- Yoshida Maru No. 1
- No. 2 Hikawa Maru
- No. 6 Kotobuki Maru
- No. 7 Hoshi Maru
- No. 17 Nanshin Maru
- Noto Maru
- Oite
- Oryoki Maru
- Oryokko Maru
- Oryoku Maru – sunk by U.S. airplanes on 15 December 1944, killing 270 of the 1,620 POWs aboard.
- OSK Ferry
- Otaro Maru
- Oyo Maru
- Pacific Maru
- Panama Maru
- Raihei Maru
- Rakuyō Maru – sunk by USS Sealion on 12 September 1944. Of 1,317 POWs, 1,159 POWs perished. 63 were rescued four days later by the submarines that sank the convoy she was in
- Rashin Maru (羅津丸)
- Rendsberg
- Rio de Janeiro Maru
- Roko Maru
- Rokyo Maru
- Ryūkyū Maru
- Samurusan Maru
- San Diego Maru
- Sandakan Steamer
- Sanko Maru
- Seikyo Maru
- Sekiho Maru (formerly Canadian Inventor)
- Shinsei Maru
- SS Shinyō Maru – sunk on 7 September 1944 by USS Paddle. 668 out of 750 American POWs aboard were killed.
- Shinyu Maru – damaged on 25 October 1942 by Dutch submarine HNLMS O 23 and abandoned. Some 100 out of 500 POWs drowned.
- Shoun Maru
- Sibijac
- Singapore Maru – left Batavia in Java 17 October 1942 with 3,000 British prisoners, arrived Moji, Japan, (via Singapore) 25 November 1942, 108 died on the journey.
- Singoto Maru
- Soong Cheong
- Subuk
- Suez Maru – sunk on 29 November 1943 by USS Bonefish. All 550 British, Dutch, Irish and New Zealand FEPOWs died. Some 300 died in the initial explosion from the two torpedo impacts and the ship's boiler exploding, both in the vicinity of these casualties in the rearmost Hold 4, or drowned on the sinking of the ship or were later shot after some 7-8 hours struggling in the sea. They were NOT trying to escape. The Japanese aboard the escort minesweeper set up twenty riflemen and two machineguns and deliberately massacred the c.250 PoW survivors in the water. The massacre was the subject of a detailed war crime investigation (National Archives of Australia NAA/MP-742) and the subject of two books (Jones, A 2002, The Suez maru Atrocity) and (Frith, J 2020, Unwritten Letters to Spring Street).
- Sugi Maru
- Suzuya Maru (formerly Hokkai Maru No. 1 also colloquially known as No. 107 or Otaru, Otari, or Otaro Maru)
- Tachibana Maru
- Taga Maru
- Taian Maru
- Taiko Maru
- Taikoku Maru
- Taka Maru
- Tamahoko Maru – sunk on 25 February 1944 by USS Tang. 560 of the 772 Australian, British, American and Dutch prisoners were killed.
- Tango Maru (formerly Rendsburg, formerly Toendjoek) – sunk on 25 February 1944 by USS Rasher. Some 300 allied POWs were amongst the 3,000 killed.
- Tanjong Penang
- Tateishi Maru, colloquially known as No. 86
- Tatsuta Maru
- Tattori Maru
- Tatu Maru
- Teia Maru (帝亞丸・帝亜丸)
- Teiryu Maru (formerly Northwestern Miller, formerly Augsberg), colloquially known as No. 824
- Tenno Maru, formerly Op Ten Noort, scuttled as Hikawa Maru No. 2
- Tenshin Maru
- Thames Maru
- Tiensen
- Tofuku Maru
- Tojuku Maru
- Toka Maru
- Toko Maru
- Tomohoku Maru
- Toro Maru
- Tottori Maru
- Toyama Maru
- Toyofuku Maru
- Toyohashi Maru
- Tufuku Maru
- Ube Maru
- Ume Maru
- Umeda Maru
- Un'yō
- Uruppu Maru
- Ussuri Maru
- Usu Maru
- Wales Maru
- Weills Maru
- Winchester Maru
- Yamagata Maru
- Yashu Maru
- Yinagata Maru
- Yone Maru
- Yoshida Maru – sunk on 18 January 1944 by USS Flasher.
- Yubi Maru
- Yuzan Maru

== See also ==
- Prisoner-of-war camp
- List of POW camps in Japan

== Sources ==
- Crager, Kelly E. (2008). Hell Under the Rising Sun: Texan POWs and the Building of the Burma – Thailand Death Railway. College Station, Texas: Texas A&M University Press. ISBN 1585446351; ISBN 9781585446353; OCLC 145378792
- Michno, Gregory. (2001). Death on the Hellships: Prisoners at Sea in the Pacific War. Annapolis: Naval Institute Press. ISBN 1557504822; ISBN 9781557504821; OCLC 45757730
- Parkinson, James W. and Lee Benson (2006). Soldier Slaves: Abandoned by the White House, Courts, and Congress. Annapolis: Naval Institute Press. ISBN 1591142040; ISBN 9781591142041; OCLC 63116439
- Roscoe, Theodore and Richard G Voge (1949). United States Submarine Operations in World War II. Annapolis: United States Naval Institute. OCLC 1127592
