= Pilotfish =

Pilotfish may refer to:

- Pilotfish (company), a company of designer
- Pilot fish, a fish of the family Carangidae
- USS Pilotfish (SS-386), a submarine
- USS Northampton (CLC-1): Pilotfish, a command ship designed in part to escort aircraft carriers lacking radar
