= SS Yoshida Maru =

Japanese cargo ship

History

Empire of Japan
- Name: Yoshida Maru
- Operator: Nippon Yusen (NYK)
- Builder: Hakodate Dock at Hakodate, Hokkaidō
- Laid down: 1940
- Launched: 9 May 1941
- Completed: 30 August 1941
- In service: 1941 - 1944
- Fate: Torpedoed and sunk, 18 February 1944

General characteristics
- Class & type: Hirota Maru-class cargo ship
- Tonnage: 2,921 GRT
- Length: 93 m (305 ft 1 in)
- Beam: 13.8 m (45 ft 3 in)
- Propulsion: 1 turbine, single screw
- Speed: 11 knots (20 km/h)

Yoshida Maru (吉田丸) was a Japanese cargo ship owned by Nippon Yusen Kaisha. The ship was built in 1941 by Hakodate Dock at Hakodate on the northern island of Hokkaidō.

== History ==
Yoshida Maru was built at Hakodate; and she left port in August 1941 on her maiden voyage.

The 2,921-ton vessel had a length of 310 feet (94 m), and her beam was 45 feet (14 m). The single turbine, single screw propulsion produced an average speed of 11 knots (20 km/h; 13 mph).

Yoshida Maru was requisitioned as an auxiliary gunboat/minelayer of the Imperial Japanese Navy. She was armed with three guns of 12 cm and machine guns. On 1 October 1943 she was reregistered as an auxiliary transport. On 18 January 1944, she was sunk by the submarine USS Flasher 140 miles (230 km) west-southwest of Minami-Tori-shima at 23°50′N 151°28′E with the loss of 76 passengers, eight crewmen and 15 gunners.

== See also ==
- List of Japanese hell ships
- Foreign commerce and shipping of Empire of Japan
