= USS Pintado (SS-387) =

Submarine of the United States

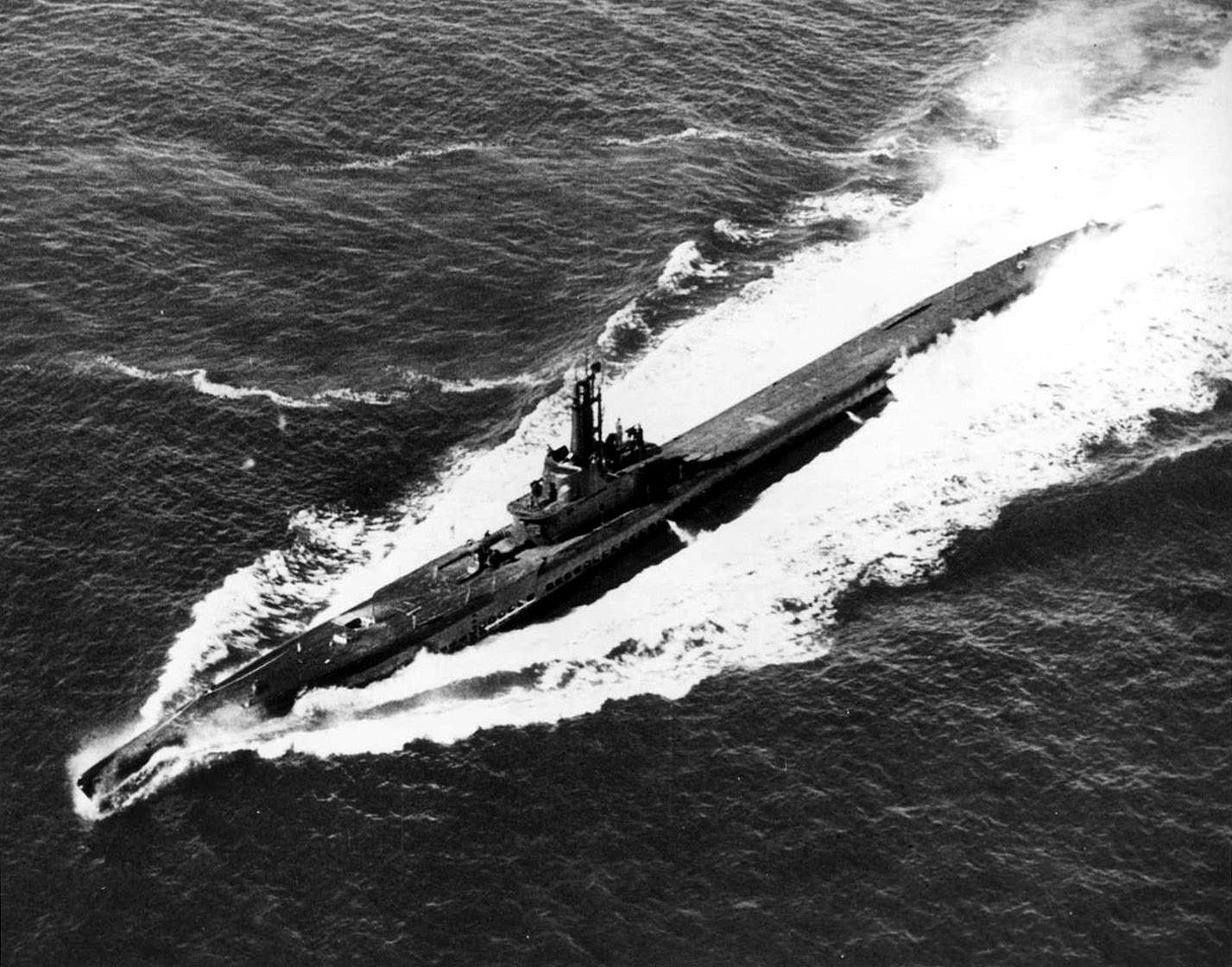
- Pintado (SS-387) underway, c. 1944/1945.

History

United States
- Builder: Portsmouth Naval Shipyard, Kittery, Maine
- Laid down: 7 May 1943
- Launched: 15 September 1943
- Commissioned: 1 January 1944
- Decommissioned: 6 March 1946
- Stricken: 1 March 1967
- Fate: Sold for scrap, 19 February 1969, conning tower at the National Museum of the Pacific War

General characteristics
- Class & type: Balao class diesel-electric submarine
- Displacement: 1,526 tons (1,550 t) surfaced; 2,391 tons (2,429 t) submerged
- Length: 311 ft 6 in (94.95 m)
- Beam: 27 ft 3 in (8.31 m)
- Draft: 16 ft 10 in (5.13 m) maximum
- Propulsion: 4 × Fairbanks-Morse Model 38D8-⅛ 10-cylinder opposed piston diesel engines driving electrical generators; 2 × 126-cell Sargo batteries; 4 × high-speed Elliott electric motors with reduction gears; two propellers; 5,400 shp (4.0 MW) surfaced; 2,740 shp (2.0 MW) submerged
- Speed: 20.25 knots (38 km/h) surfaced; 8.75 knots (16 km/h) submerged
- Range: 11,000 nautical miles (20,000 km) surfaced at 10 knots (19 km/h)
- Endurance: 48 hours at 2 knots (3.7 km/h) submerged; 75 days on patrol
- Test depth: 400 ft (120 m)
- Complement: 10 officers, 70–71 enlisted
- Armament: 10 × 21-inch (533 mm) torpedo tubes; 6 forward, 4 aft; 24 torpedoes; 1 × 5-inch (127 mm) / 25 caliber deck gun; Bofors 40 mm and Oerlikon 20 mm cannon

USS Pintado (SS-387/AGSS-387), a Balao-class submarine, was the first ship of the United States Navy to be named for the pintado.

== Construction and commissioning ==
Pintado was laid down by the Portsmouth Navy Yard at Kittery, Maine, on 7 May 1943; launched on 15 September 1943, sponsored by Mrs. Antonio Prince; and commissioned on 1 January 1944, Lieutenant Commander Bernard A. Clarey in command, and Corwin H. Mendenhall as her executive officer. Mendenhall would later write a book about patrols of the Pintado.

== Operational history ==
Pintado departed Portsmouth, New Hampshire, on 17 February 1944 for torpedo trials at Newport, training from Naval Submarine Base New London at New London, Connecticut, and antisubmarine warfare tactics and experiments with torpedo developments from Key West, Florida. She sailed for the Pacific Ocean on 31 March 1944, transited the Panama Canal, and arrived at Pearl Harbor, Hawaii, on 23 April 1944.

=== World War II ===
==== First patrol, May – July 1944 ====
On her first war patrol, Pintado was the flagship of a wolfpack, commanded by Captain Leon N. Blair, which also included submarines USS Shark and Pilotfish. The attack group departed Pearl Harbor 16 May, touched at Midway 20 May – 21 May, and headed for waters west of the Marianas and south of Formosa. On 31 May, they formed a scouting line in search of a convoy reported by submarine Silversides.

After sparring with the convoy's escorts through the night, Pintado managed to reach attack position shortly before dawn and fired a spread of six torpedoes at overlapping targets, destroying the 4,716 ton cargo ship Toho Maru. She then daringly came within 700 yards (640 m) of an escort while bringing her stern tubes to bear on another merchant ship. Although explosions suggested that some of the second spread of torpedoes had scored, no second sinking has been confirmed. Pintado then skillfully evaded angry Japanese destroyers and sped away to safety.

About midday on 4 June, Pintado sighted smoke from a Japanese convoy heading toward Saipan. She and her sister subs headed for the enemy, and soon Shark sank 6,886-ton cargo ship Katsunkawa Maru before escaping from a heavy depth charge attack. The American submarines continued to shadow the convoy and early the next day Shark's torpedoes accounted for two more cargo ships.

Pintado made her kills shortly before noon of 6 June, D-Day in Normandy, with a spread of torpedoes at overlapping targets. An awesome explosion tore one ship apart, her bow and stern both projecting up in the air as she sank. The stern of a second was under water before she was swallowed by smoke and flame. These victims were later identified as 5,652-ton Havre Maru and 2,825-ton Kashimasan Maru. An airplane and five escorts tried to box in the submarine and dropped over 50 depth charges, but she escaped damage.

Pintado and her sisters in the wolfpack had all but destroyed the convoy which was attempting to reinforce Japanese defenses of the Marianas. While escorts rescued many of the 7,000 troops whose ships had gone down, they had lost weapons, tanks, and equipment. This greatly weakened Japan's defensive capability in the Marianas for the impending American invasion of Saipan. Pintado then headed for the Marshall Islands, arriving Majuro 1 July for refit.

==== Second patrol, July – September 1944 ====
Her second war patrol took the submarine to the East China Sea. On 6 August she sank 5,401-ton cargoship Shonan Maru and damaged another target in a Formosa-bound convoy, before escaping through a barrage of exploding depth charges. On 22 August Pintado spotted an 11-ship convoy guarded by three escorts. After dark she moved into the center of the convoy, passing a scant 75 yards (69 m) from an escort, to attack Tonan Maru No. 2, a former whale factory which Lt. Comdr. Clarey, as executive officer of Amberjack, had helped to sink in Kavieng Harbor, Bismarck Archipelago, 10 October 1942. Since then, the Japanese had raised the ship and towed her to Japan where she was repaired and converted to a tanker.

Two spreads of torpedoes from the submarine left the ship ablaze and sinking and damaged two other tankers. At 19,262 tons, Tonan Maru No. 2 was one of the largest merchant ships sunk by an American submarine in World War II. Following lifeguard station duty off Japan, Pintado turned eastward 1 September and arrived Pearl Harbor on 14 September.

==== Third patrol, October 1944 – January 1945 ====
On Pintado's third war patrol, Lt. Comdr. Clarey commanded a wolfpack which included Atule and Jallao. The group departed Pearl Harbor 9 October heading for the South China Sea. Meanwhile, General Douglas MacArthur was preparing to return to the Philippines. When his troops landed on Leyte 20 October, the Japanese Navy struck back with all its force in a "go for broke" attempt to smash the invasion. The result was the Battle for Leyte Gulf.

As the Americans turned back the Japanese offensive, Clarey's submarines sped toward Luzon Strait to attack the Northern Japanese Force which Admiral William Halsey's Third Fleet had engaged off Cape Engaño. On the night of 25 October, Jallao made radar contact with bomb-damaged light cruiser Tama fleeing from Halsey. Pintado closed the scene with Jallao but held her fire while her sister submarine attacked, ready to join in if needed. Jallao launched seven torpedoes, and Tama broke up and sank, the last cruiser to go down in the Battle off Cape Engaño.

A bonus came on 3 November when Pintado's periscope revealed "the largest enemy ship we have ever seen", apparently an oiler in the support group for the Japanese carriers. Clarey fired six bow torpedoes at the huge target, but enemy destroyer Akikaze deliberately crossed their path to intercept the torpedoes before they could reach their target. The destroyer disintegrated in a tremendous explosion which provided an effective smoke screen protecting the original target until the two remaining Japanese escorts forced the submarine to dive and withdraw to escape exploding depth charges.

Pintado joined Halibut on 14 November and escorted the damaged submarine to Saipan, arriving Tanapag Harbor five days later. After a week in port, she resumed her war patrol south of Takao. On the night of 12 December – 13 December, she sank two enemy landing craft, Transport No. 12 and Transport No. 104, and claimed she had sunk a third, Transport No. 106, but apparently missed. Two days later she headed for Australia and arrived Brisbane on New Year's Day 1945. She won the Presidential Unit Citation for extraordinary skill and heroism on her first three war patrols.

==== Fourth–sixth patrols, January – August 1945 ====
The veteran submarine departed Brisbane 27 January but found no targets as she patrolled the Singapore-Saigon shipping lanes. Throughout the patrol, she played hide and go seek with Japanese aircraft and, on 20 February, barely escaped when a plane appeared from the clouds and dropped two depth charges which jarred the submarine. She made temporary repairs and continued to patrol until returning to Fremantle 30 March.

Pintado sailed to Pearl Harbor before getting underway 1 June for her fifth war patrol on lifeguard station for bomber raids on Tokyo. On 26 June, just south of Honshū, a smoking B-29 bomber, the City of Galveston, crossed her bow at about 2,000 feet (600 m), dropped a dozen parachutes, crashed into the sea and exploded. In less than an hour the submarine had rescued the entire crew which she took to Guam, arriving Apra Harbor a fortnight later. Color Footage of that video can be found at The Museum of Flight

The submarine departed Guam 7 August for her sixth and last war patrol, and took station off Tokyo Bay until hearing that hostilities had ended on 15 August. She returned to Pearl Harbor on 25 August and reached San Francisco 5 September. She remained there until decommissioning 6 March 1946.

=== Postwar ===
While in the Pacific Reserve Fleet, Pintado was reclassified AGSS-387 on 1 December 1962. She was struck from the Naval Vessel Register 1 March 1967 and sold for scrapping to Zidell Explorations, Inc., Portland, Oregon, 20 January 1969.

During the war, Pintado was credited with sinking 13 ships of 98,600 tons, and damaging two additional vessels, one a 28,000 ton aircraft carrier to score a total of 34,300 tons. Postwar, this was reduced to eight ships for 42,963 tons by the Joint Army-Navy Assessment Committee.

Her conning tower is on display at the National Museum of the Pacific War in Fredericksburg, Texas.
