= Arisan Maru =

Japanese type 2A freighter

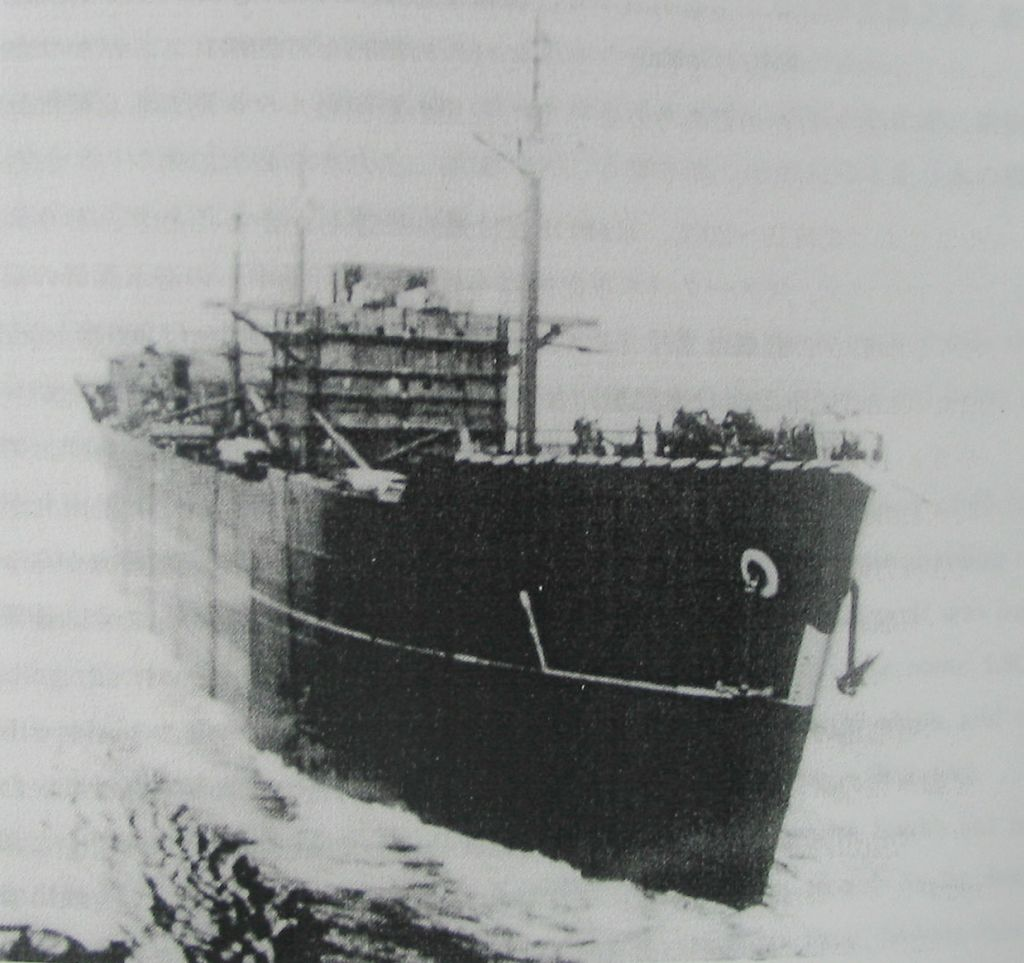
- Launch of Arisan Maru

History
- Name: Arisan Maru
- Owner: Mitsui Senpaku
- Port of registry: (Empire of Japan)
- Builder: Mitsui, Tamanao, Japan
- Yard number: 376
- Completed: June 22, 1944
- Fate: Sunk, 24 October 1944
- Notes: Hell ship

General characteristics
- Class & type: Type 2A freighter
- Tonnage: 6,886 GRT; 11,200 DWT
- Length: 137.3 m (450 ft 6 in) oa; 129.9 m (426 ft 2 in) pp
- Beam: 18.2 m (59 ft 9 in)

Arisan Maru (阿里山丸) was a 6,886 GRT Type 2A freighter constructed in 1944 during World War II and was one of Imperial Japan's hell ships. The vessel, named for a mountain on Taiwan, was initially used as a troop transport. The vessel was then turned over for use for the transportation of prisoners of war (POWs) from the Philippines to Manchuria, China or Japan. On October 24, 1944, the ship was torpedoed by an American submarine and sank. Of the 1,781 POWs aboard, all of them escaped the sinking ship but were not rescued by the Japanese. In the end, only nine of the prisoners survived the sinking.

== Description ==
Arisan Maru was a Type 2A freighter that measured 6,886 gross register tons (GRT), was 137.3 m (450 ft 6 in) long overall and 129.9 m (426 ft 2 in) between perpendiculars with a beam of 18.2 m (59 ft 9 in). The vessel was powered by steam turbines turning one propeller. The vessel had three holds, with No.2 hold being 15 by 23 metres (50 ft × 75 ft). The vessel was designed for the transportation of raw materials such as coal and nickel.

== Service history ==
Arisan Maru was constructed by Mitsui at their yard in Tamano, Japan with the yard number 376. The freighter was completed on 22 June 1944 and owned by Mitsui Senpaku. The vessel was named for a mountain in Formosa and was first assigned to transport 6,000 troops of the Kwantung Army from Pusan, Korea to Okinawa. The vessel was then ordered to transport POWs from the Philippines to Manchuria, China, or Japan. Three tiers of bunks were installed that were separated by 0.91 metres (3 ft). On October 11, 1944, Arisan Maru embarked 1,782 Allied POWs at Manila, a mix of military personnel and civilian detainees. Detained Allied personnel were being evacuated from the Philippines and due to Allied air raids, they were quickly loaded onto the ship, with more people placed in the one hold than could be reasonably accommodated. Each POW was given eight five-gallon oil cans for their waste, which quickly overflowed due to a number of men afflicted by dysentery. The POWs suffered through unsanitary conditions, extreme heat within the hold (120 °F, 49 °C) and a lack of water.

Arisan Maru then departed Manila and sailed south to the west coast of Palawan. During this time an escape attempt led to a POW death, and four other POWs died of sickness. There, along the Palawan coast, Arisan Maru waited for several days while Allied air raids hit Manila. Then, on October 20, the freighter returned to Manila.

=== Final voyage ===
On October 21, Arisan Maru departed Manila for the final time, joining convoy MATA-30 heading for Takao. The convoy was composed of 13 merchant vessels, three destroyers as escorts and one fleet supply ship. Arisan Maru was one of the slowest ships in the convoy, capable of making no more than 7 knots (13 km/h; 8.1 mph). On October 23, the destroyers began picking up signals from American submarines. Roughly 200 nautical miles (370 km; 230 mi) west of Cape Bojeador, Luzon, the convoy was ordered to break up due to the sheer number and to sail at fastest possible speed for Takao (modern day Kaohsiung Taiwan) due to the American submarine threat.

On October 24, 1944, Arisan Maru, by then traveling alone, was steaming in the Bashi Channel between the Philippines and Taiwan with 1,781 POWs, mostly Americans. Being an unmarked ship - which was not obliged, Japan as well as the Allies had rejected in 1942 the proposal of the International Red Cross to mark ships with POW's - it was hit by a torpedo from USS Shark, at about 5 p.m. in the No.3 hold. The ship buckled amidships, the engines stopped and the aft mast fell, but the freighter stayed afloat. She finally sank around 7:40 p.m at 20°46′N 118°18′E. In response to the torpedo, the destroyers Take and Harukaze attacked and sank Shark. After dealing with the American submarine, the two destroyers returned to Arisan Maru to look for survivors. No POWs were killed by the torpedo strikes and nearly all were able to leave the ship's holds but the Japanese did not rescue any of the POWs that day, only Japanese. Only nine of the prisoners aboard survived the event. Five escaped and made their way to China in one of the ship's two lifeboats. They were reunited with U.S. Forces and returned to the United States. The four others were later recaptured by Imperial Japanese naval vessels, where one died shortly after reaching land.

The Arisan Maru tragedy resulted to the greatest loss of American life in maritime history.

== See also ==
- List by death toll of ships sunk by submarines
- List of maritime disasters in World War II
- Sultana (steamboat)
