= Willard R. Laughon =

Willard Ross Laughon
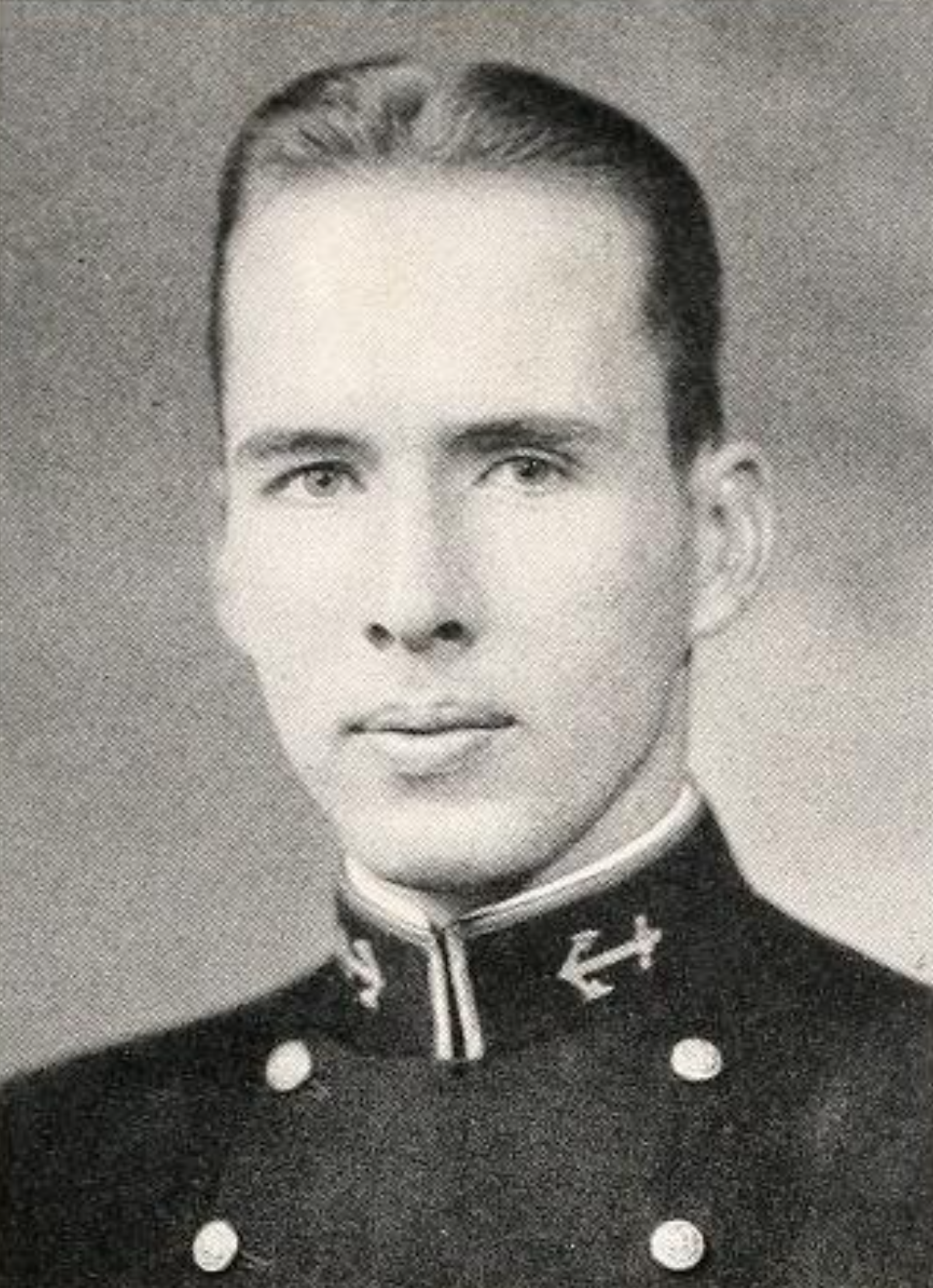
- Midshipman Laughon
- Born: January 29, 1911; Princeton, West Virginia, U.S.
- Died: June 5, 1999 (aged 88); Stuart, Florida, U.S.
- Alma mater: United States Naval Academy
- Spouse: Alice Mellott
- Military career
- Allegiance: United States of America
- Branch: United States Navy
- Service years: 1933–1963
- Rank: Captain
- Commands: USS R-1 (SS-78); USS Puffer (SS-268); USS Rasher; USS Orion (AS-18); Submarine Squadron 12
- Conflicts: World War II
- Awards: Navy Cross (2)

Willard Ross Laughon (29 January 1911 – 5 June 1999) was a double Navy Cross recipient submarine commander during World War II who reached the rank of captain in the United States Navy.

== Early life ==
Willard Ross Laughon was born on January 29, 1911, in Princeton, West Virginia, to Fred Thomas and Mattie Virginia Laughon (née Waddell). In 1929 he was accepted to the United States Naval Academy, and graduated in 1933.

== Early military career ==
Upon graduating from Annapolis, Laughon was commissioned as an ensign in the United States Navy. His first duty assignment was aboard the USS Arkansas making cruises up and down the west coast. His following assignment was aboard the USS Idaho.

In 1936 he married Alice Mellott of Salisbury, Maryland and was assigned to the Submarine School at New London, Connecticut.

In 1940, he aided in the recommission of the USS R-1 and took part in ten war patrols, the last four of them as commander.

== World War II ==
On December 9, 1943, Laughon took command of the USS Rasher based in Fremantle, Australia. Ten days later the USS Rasher set off for the South China Sea along with the USS Bluefish to lay mines and sink shipping.
