= SS Ryūsei Maru =

Japanese-owned cargo steamship that was sunk in WW2

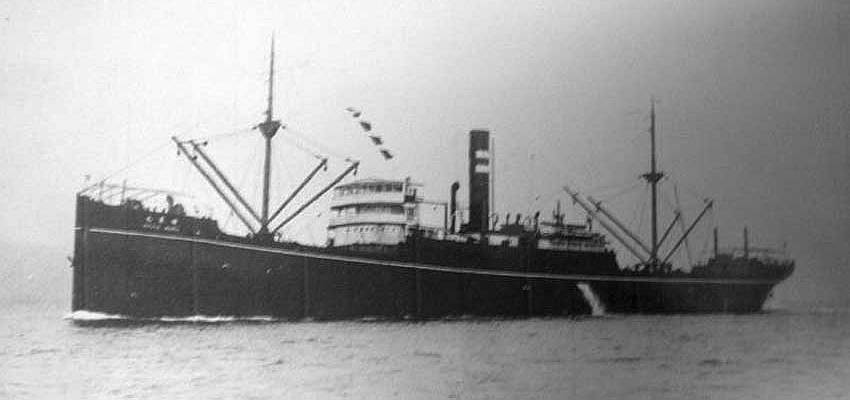
- Ryūsei Maru

History
- Name: 1911: Bra-Kar; 1916: Havø; 1935: Mabuhay II; 1938: Ryūsei Maru
- Owner: 1911: Akties Bonheur; 1916: Henrik Østervold; 1920: Henrik Østervolds Rederi A/S; 1935: Far Eastern SS Co Ltd A/S; 1938: Matsumoto Masaichi
- Operator: 1911: Fred. Olsen & Co.; 1920: Henrik Østervold; 1935: Johan Gran; 1943: Imperial Japanese Army
- Port of registry: 1911: (Norway) Christiania; 1920: (Norway) Bergen; 1938: (Empire of Japan) Kobe
- Builder: Tyne Iron SB Co, Willington Quay
- Yard number: 177
- Launched: 14 February 1911
- Completed: March 1911
- Identification: 1911: code letters MGNT; 1934: call sign LDCA; 1938: call sign JXDM
- Fate: Sunk in the Bali Sea, 25 February 1944

General characteristics
- Type: cargo ship
- Tonnage: 4,777 GRT, 2,973 NRT
- Length: 385.0 ft (117.3 m)
- Beam: 51.0 ft (15.5 m)
- Depth: 27.6 ft (8.4 m)
- Decks: 2
- Installed power: 349 NHP
- Propulsion: 1 × screw; 1 × triple-expansion engine
- Speed: 9 knots (17 km/h)

Ryusei Maru (隆西丸, Ryūsei Maru) was a cargo steamship that was built in England in 1911 and sunk off the coast of Bali in 1944. She was launched as Bra-Kar for Fred. Olsen & Co. of Norway. In 1916 she changed owners and was renamed Havø. In 1935 she changed owners again and was renamed Mabuhay II.

In 1938 Japanese owners acquired the ship and renamed her Ryūsei Maru. In 1944 she was serving as a hell ship when a United States Navy submarine torpedoed her, sinking the vessel with the loss of between 3,000 and 5,000 lives.

This was the first of four Fred Olsen ships to be called Bra-Kar. The second was a steamship built in 1920, sold in 1922, and renamed. The third was a motor ship built in 1928, and sunk by enemy action in 1943. The fourth was a Type C1 motor ship bought second-hand in 1946, sold in 1961, and renamed.

== Building Bra-Kar ==
The Tyne Iron Shipbuilding Company built the ship as yard number 177 at Willington Quay on the River Tyne. She was launched on 14 February 1911 and completed that March. Her registered length was 385.0 ft (117.3 m), her beam was 51.0 ft (15.5 m), and her depth was 27.6 ft (8.4 m). Her tonnages were 4,777 gross register tons (GRT) and 2,973 net register tons (NRT).

She had a single screw, driven by a three-cylinder triple-expansion engine built by John Dickinson and Sons of Sunderland. The engine was rated at 349 nominal horsepower, and gave her a speed of 9 knots (17 km/h).

Bra-Kar's owner was Akties Bonheur, and Fred Olsen & Co managed her. She was registered in Christiania. Her code letters were MGNT.

== Havø and Mabuhay II ==
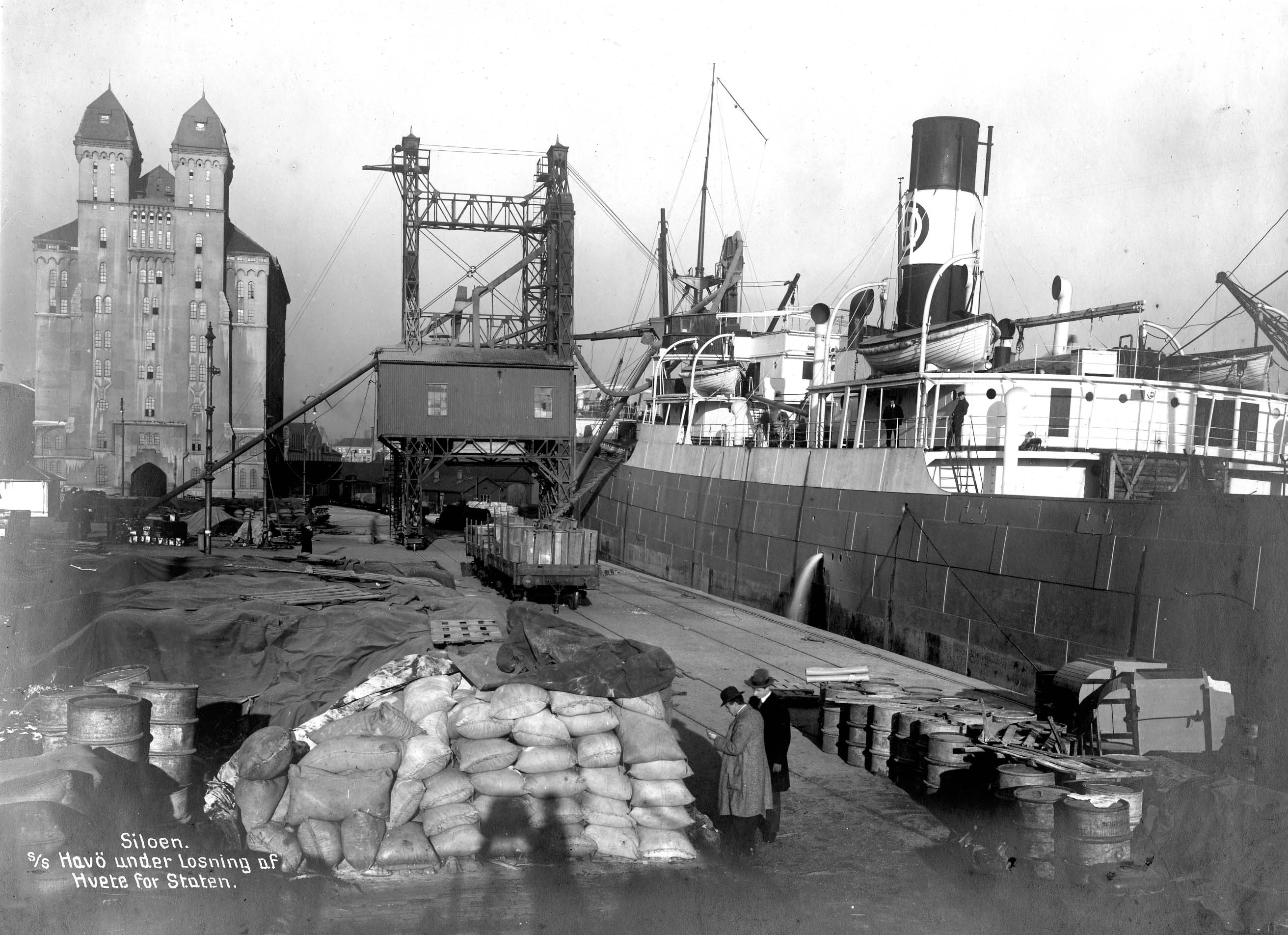
The ship as Havø, discharging a cargo of wheat

In 1916 Henrik Østervold acquired Bra-Kar and renamed her Havø. By 1920 she was equipped for wireless telegraphy, and that year Østervold transferred her registration to Bergen. In 1934 the call sign LDCA superseded her code letters. In 1935 the Far Eastern Steamship Co Ltd A/S acquired Havø, renamed her Mabuhay II, and appointed Johan Gran to manage her.

== Ryūsei Maru ==
In 1938 Matsumoto Masaichi acquired Mabuhay II and renamed her Ryūsei Maru. The ship was registered in Kobe, and her call sign was JXDM.

In 1943, Matsumoto Masaichi merged with Nakamura Kisen KK. On 5 November that year the Imperial Japanese Army requisitioned Ryūsei Maru for its Railways and Shipping Section.

On 24 February 1944 Ryūsei Maru left Surabaya, Java for Ambon, Maluku carrying about 6,600 men: 1,244 Japanese Army soldiers, 2,865 Indian prisoners of war, and 2,559 rōmusha conscripted labourers. The vessel was part of a convoy with Tango Maru, escorted by the minesweepers W-8 and W-11, and the auxiliary submarine chaser Takunan Maru No. 5.

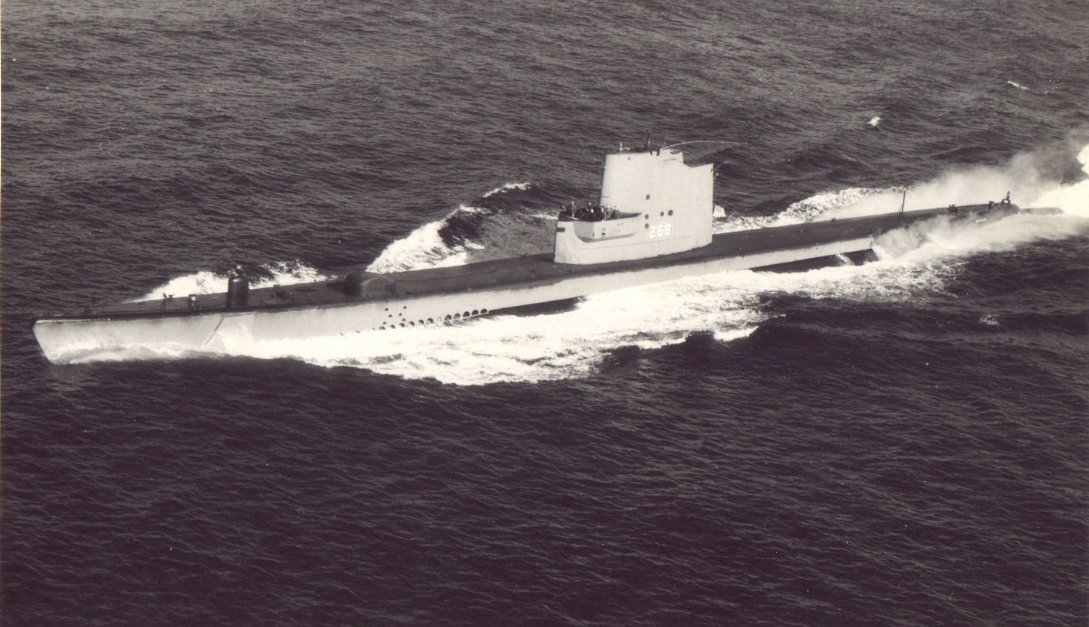
USS Rasher

Allied naval intelligence was aware of the convoy, and the US Navy sent the submarines Rasher and Raton to the Bali Sea to intercept it. At 2045 hrs on 25 February, Rasher sank Tango Maru by torpedo at position 7°25′S 115°06′E, about 25 nautical miles (46 km) north of Bali. At least 3,000 of the people aboard were killed.

At 2225 hrs on the same evening, Rasher fired a spread of four torpedoes at Ryūsei Maru at position 7°33′S 115°09′E. Three hit the ship, splitting her in two. Estimates of fatalities range from at least 3,000 to 4,998.

== See also ==
- List by death toll of ships sunk by submarines

== Bibliography ==
- Lloyd's Register of British and Foreign Shipping. Vol. II.–Steamers. London: Lloyd's Register of Shipping. 1911 – via Internet Archive.
- Lloyd's Register of Shipping. Vol. II.–Steamers. London: Lloyd's Register of Shipping. 1917 – via Internet Archive.
- Lloyd's Register of Shipping. Vol. II.–Steamers. London: Lloyd's Register of Shipping. 1920 – via Internet Archive.
- Lloyd's Register of Shipping (PDF). Vol. II.–Steamers and Motorships of 300 tons gross and over. London: Lloyd's Register of Shipping. 1930 – via Southampton City Council.
- Lloyd's Register of Shipping (PDF). Vol. II.–Steamers and Motorships of 300 tons gross and over. London: Lloyd's Register of Shipping. 1934 – via Southampton City Council.
- Lloyd's Register of Shipping (PDF). Vol. II.–Steamers and Motorships over 300 tons. London: Lloyd's Register of Shipping. 1936 – via Southampton City Council.
- Lloyd's Register of Shipping (PDF). Vol. II.–Steamers and Motorships over 300 tons. London: Lloyd's Register of Shipping. 1939 – via Southampton City Council.
- Lloyd's Register of Shipping. Vol. Steamers and motorships of 300 tons gross and over. Steamers and motorships under 300 tons, trawlers, tugs, dredgers, &c. London: Lloyd's Register of Shipping. 1947 – via Internet Archive.
