= USS Rasher =

Submarine of the United States

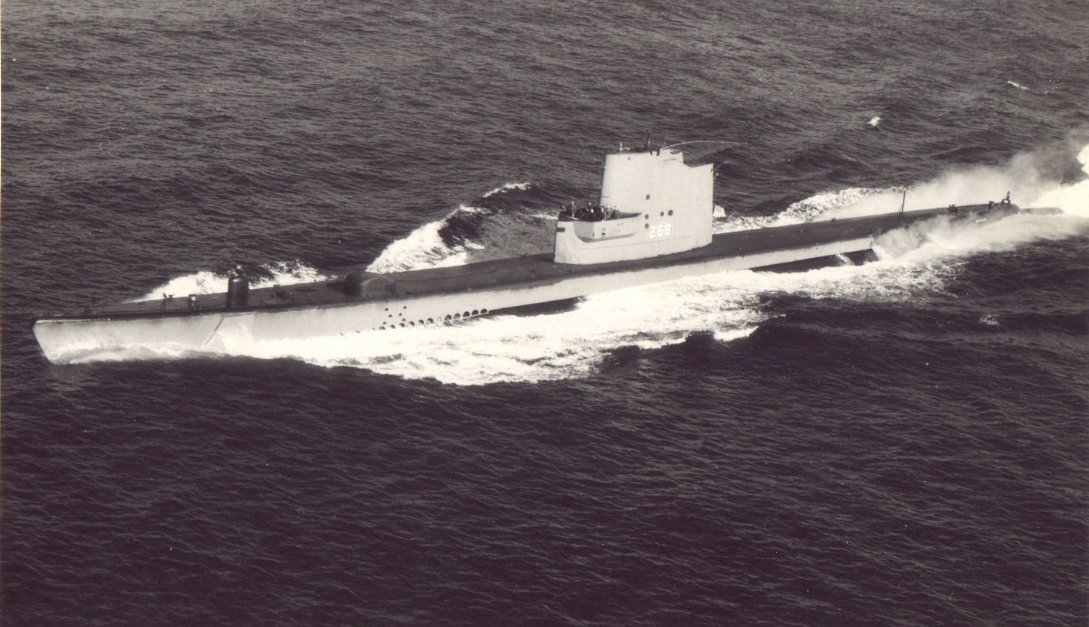
- USS Rasher sometime after her 1953 recommissioning

History

United States
- Namesake: Rasher (Sebastes miniatus)
- Builder: Manitowoc Shipbuilding Company, Manitowoc, Wisconsin
- Laid down: 4 May 1942
- Launched: 20 December 1942
- Sponsored by: Mrs. G. C. Weaver
- Commissioned: 8 June 1943
- Decommissioned: 22 June 1946
- Recommissioned: 14 December 1951
- Decommissioned: 28 May 1952
- Recommissioned: 22 July 1953
- Decommissioned: 27 May 1967
- Stricken: 20 December 1971
- Fate: Sold for scrap 7 August 1974

General characteristics
- Class & type: Gato-class diesel-electric submarine
- Displacement: 1,525 tons (1,549 t) surfaced; 2,424 tons (2,460 t) submerged
- Length: 311 ft 9 in (95.02 m)
- Beam: 27 ft 3 in (8.31 m)
- Draft: 17 ft 0 in (5.18 m) maximum
- Propulsion: 4 × General Motors Model 16-248 V16 Diesel engines driving electric generators; 2 × 126-cell Sargo batteries; 4 × high-speed General Electric electric motors with reduction gears; two propellers; 5,400 shp (4.0 MW) surfaced; 2,740 shp (2.0 MW) submerged
- Speed: 21 knots (39 km/h) surfaced; 9 knots (17 km/h) submerged
- Range: 11,000 NM (20,000 km) surfaced at 10 knots (19 km/h)
- Endurance: 48 hours at 2 knots (4 km/h) submerged; 75 days on patrol
- Test depth: 300 ft (90 m)
- Complement: 6 officers, 54 enlisted
- Armament: 10 × 21-inch (533 mm) torpedo tubes; 6 forward, 4 aft; 24 torpedoes; 1 × 3-inch (76 mm) / 50 caliber deck gun; Bofors 40 mm and Oerlikon 20 mm cannon; 3-inch gun replaced with 5-inch (127 mm) in October 1944

USS Rasher (SS/SSR/AGSS/IXSS-269), a Gato-class submarine, was a ship of the United States Navy named for the rasher, or vermilion rockfish, a fish found along the California coast.

== Construction and commissioning ==
Rasher, a fleet submarine, was laid down on 4 May 1942 by Manitowoc Shipbuilding Company at Manitowoc, Wisconsin; launched 20 December 1942, sponsored by Mrs. G. C. Weaver; and commissioned 8 June 1943, Commander E. S. Hutchinson in command. Admiral Charles A. Lockwood had earlier relieved Hutchinson of command of the submarine USS Grampus (SS-207) for lacking aggressiveness.

== Service history ==
Following builder's trials in Lake Michigan, Rasher was decommissioned and towed down the Mississippi on a floating drydock. After recommissioning and fitting out in New Orleans, the new submarine trained in the Bay of Panama, departed Balboa 8 August 1943, and arrived at Brisbane, Australia, on 11 September.

=== First war patrol, September – November 1943 ===
On her first war patrol, 24 September through 24 November 1943, Rasher operated in the Makassar Strait–Celebes Sea area, and sank the passenger-cargo ship Kogane Maru in a submerged attack at dawn on 9 October. Four days later, off Ambon Harbor, she spotted a convoy of four merchantmen escorted by two destroyers and a "Pete" seaplane. She fired two salvoes of three torpedoes each, then crash dived to avoid the destroyers and bombs from the scout plane. Freighter Kenkoku Maru broke up and sank, while the escorts struck back in a vigorous but vain counterattack.

On the afternoon of 31 October, while patrolling the shipping lanes off the Borneo coast, Rasher commenced trailing tanker Koryo Maru, but because of a patrolling float plane, was unable to attack until night. Rasher then surfaced, attacked and sent the tanker to the bottom after a thunderous explosion of exploding torpedoes and gasoline.

The submarine's next victim was tanker Tango Maru which lost her stern to a spread of three torpedoes on the afternoon of 8 November. Rasher escaped the escorts by diving deep and silently slipping away. A midnight attack on a second convoy in the Makassar Strait off Mangkalihat Peninsula resulted in a hit on a tanker, but vigorous countermeasures by enemy destroyers prevented any assessment of damage. Rasher escaped the enemy surface craft and, her torpedoes expended, headed home. During her transit, an Allied patrol bomber mistakenly attacked her in the Indian Ocean 310 nautical miles (574 km; 357 mi) north-northeast of Exmouth Gulf in Western Australia at 17°44′S 115°39′E on 20 November 1943, dropping a depth charge as Rasher was submerging and passing a depth of 47 feet (14 m). Rasher sustained no damage, and arrived at Fremantle on 24 November 1943.

Hutchinson had cleared his record on Grampus with the sinkings and was promoted to command a submarine division.

=== Second war patrol, December 1943 – January 1944 ===
Command of Rasher was given to Willard Ross Laughon, former commanding officer of R-1 in the Atlantic Ocean. Following refit, Rasher commenced her second war patrol on 19 December 1943 and hunted Japanese shipping in the South China Sea off Borneo. When she attacked a three-tanker convoy on the night of 4 January 1944, her first torpedo exploded prematurely. A melee ensued, with tankers scattering and escorts racing about, firing in all directions. Rasher was pursuing Hakko Maru when the tanker exploded from a torpedo from Bluefish. Rasher fired at a second target while submerged, and heard explosions, but was unable to confirm a sinking. She pursued the third tanker, firing a spread of four torpedoes early on the morning of 5 January 1944. A mushroom-shaped fire rose as the last two torpedoes struck, and Kiyo Maru sank, leaving an oil slick and scattered debris. During the patrol, Rasher planted mines off the approaches to Saigon harbor. Prematurely exploding torpedoes and vigilant escorts frustrated her attacks on convoys on 11 January and 17 January. A week later she returned to Fremantle.

=== Third and fourth war patrols, February – June 1944 ===
Rasher's third war patrol from 19 February to 4 April 1944, was conducted in the Java Sea–Celebes Sea area. On 25 February she attacked a Japanese convoy off Bali. First she sank the cargo ships Tango Maru, killing thousands of Imperial Japanese Army soldiers, Javanese rōmusha forced laborers, and Allied prisoners-of-war. Later in the same attack she sank Ryusei Maru, killing up to 5,000 of her complement of Japanese Army soldiers, Indian prisoners of war, and rōmusha forced labourers. Then, after transiting Makassar Strait into the Celebes Sea, she destroyed the cargo ship Nattai Maru on 3 March.

On 19 March 1944, Rasher sighted the Japanese submarine Ro-112 as Ro-112 was surfacing in the Java Sea north of Bali off Cape Bungkulan at 08°02′S 115°25′E. Rasher's watch officer described Ro-112 as a black submarine of the "Ro-51 class." At 11:49, Rasher fired four Mark 14 Mod 3 torpedoes at Ro-112, but Ro-112 turned to port and evaded them. En route home, however, Rasher met the 2,750-ton freighter Nichinan Maru on 27 March and sank her.

Rasher returned to the Makassar Strait-Celebes Sea area for her fourth patrol, from 30 April to 23 June 1944. On 11 May, she torpedoed and sank the freighter Choi Maru. Next to go down were the converted gunboat Anshu Maru on 29 May and the tanker Shioya Maru in the Celebes Sea off Manado on 8 June. On 14 June, the cargo ship Koan Maru went to the bottom, after taking a spread of torpedoes aft and capsizing.

=== Fifth war patrol, 22 July – 3 September 1944 ===
Commander Henry G. Munson relieved Commander Laughon as commanding officer of Rasher. Rasher's fifth patrol was spent largely with Bluefish in the South China Sea west of Luzon.

Thirty miles south of Scarborough Shoal at 2255 5 August, Rasher launched a spread of six bow torpedoes at the largest ship in a three-ship convoy. Diving to avoid being rammed, Rasher's crew counted five hits and heard the sounds of a ship breaking up as the army cargo ship Shiroganesan Maru went down.

Rasher observed nine successive aircraft contacts to the north on the afternoon of 18 August and deduced these were air patrols for an important convoy. That dark, rainy night Rasher's radar picked up a 13-knot (24 km/h) convoy of thirteen ships protected by six escorts. After a surfaced approach to 2,800 yards (2,600 m), two stern torpedoes were launched at Teiyo Maru at 2122. Both torpedoes hit and the tanker loaded with gasoline exploded into a column of flame 1,000 feet (300 m) high, with parts of the ship being blown 500 yards (460 m) from the flaming hulk. The escorts fired wildly and laid depth charge patterns astern of Rasher. In a second surfaced approach to 3,300 yards (3,000 m) Rasher launched a spread of six bow torpedoes. Three torpedoes hit and sank the 17,000 ton transport Teia Maru, killing 2,665 Japanese soldiers, and a fourth torpedo was heard exploding at a timed range of 3900 yards. Rasher swung hard to port to launch four stern torpedoes at 2214. Three torpedoes hit and sank the 20,000 ton carrier Taiyō, which was escorting the convoy, and the fourth torpedo was heard exploding on a more distant ship.

Rasher pulled away to reload torpedo tubes and the convoy split into two groups. Rasher followed the group moving northwest while Bluefish intercepted the remaining ships continuing southwesterly and sank two tankers. Rasher launched four bow torpedoes at a range of 2,200 yards (2,000 m), and three hits on the cargo-transport Eishin Maru caused an ammunition detonation with the pressure wave sweeping over the submarine's bridge. The fourth torpedo was heard exploding on a more distant ship. Rasher then swung hard right to launch two stern torpedoes. Both torpedoes hit and Noshiro Maru slowed to 5 knots (9.3 km/h) and reversed course. Spadefish joined the wolfpack and scored hits on two of the surviving transports.

Rasher counted sixteen detonations from the eighteen torpedoes fired on 18 August and five detonations for the six fired on 5 August. With all torpedoes expended, Rasher set course for Midway. Munson was called into a secret conference at Midway to compare his observations with decrypted Japanese message traffic. Postwar accounting verified Rasher had sunk the highest tonnage of any World War II U.S. submarine patrol to that date. That record would be exceeded only once, when USS Archerfish (SS-311) sank the Japanese aircraft carrier Shinano three months later. Rasher proceeded to San Francisco via Hawaii for overhaul at Hunter's Point Naval Shipyard on 11 September. She was given a new 5-inch deck gun, ST radar, and many other upgrades.

=== Sixth, seventh, and eighth war patrols, January – August 1945 ===
Benjamin Ernest Adams Jr. replaced Munson for the sixth war patrol. Rasher departed San Francisco on 20 December 1944, arriving at Midway via Pearl Harbor in early January 1945. Her sixth patrol, as a unit of a wolfpack with Pilotfish and Finback, commenced on 29 January, and was conducted in the southern sector of the East China Sea. Rasher attacked a pair of ships on 15 February but missed, and approached a convoy the next day but was unable to get in position to attack. A later attack on another convoy also ended in misses. No other suitable targets were found, only small patrol craft, hospital ships, and ubiquitous patrol aircraft. The patrol ended on 16 March 1945 at Guam.

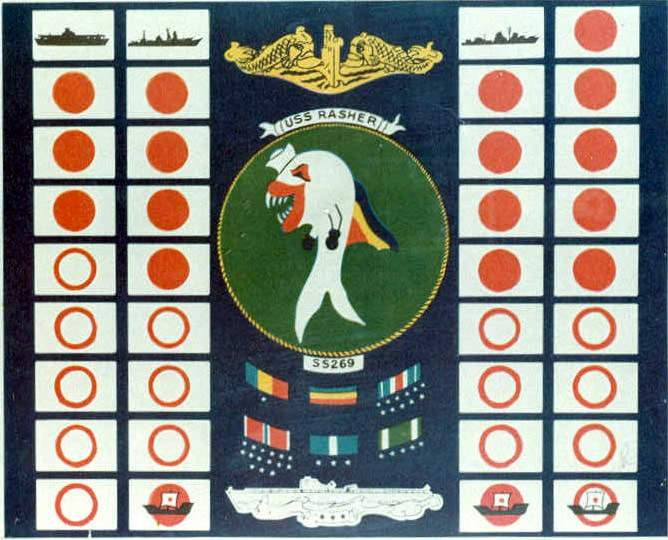
Battleflag of the Rasher (SS-269), 1945.

Charles Derick Nace replaced Adams for the seventh and eighth patrols. Rasher's seventh patrol, 17 April to 29 May 1945, was little more rewarding than the sixth. On lifeguard station off Honshū, she riddled two small craft with gunfire. No aircraft came down in her area, and she returned to Midway on 29 May.

Rasher departed Midway 23 June 1945 to take lifeguard station off southern Formosa. No Allied planes were downed in her area before orders arrived to proceed to the Gulf of Siam. While she was en route the war ended, and Rasher returned to the Philippines. She departed Subic Bay on 31 August arriving New York on 6 October, via Pearl Harbor and the Panama Canal. Following deactivation overhaul, she was decommissioned 22 June 1946 and was placed in the Atlantic Reserve Fleet at New London, Connecticut.

Rasher was credited with sinking 99,901 tons of Japanese shipping, the third highest total for US submarines in World War II. However, a Japanese destroyer credited as sunk by sister ship USS Flasher (SS-249) is given a name that never existed and may have been a case of mistaken identity. If the tonnage credited for this ship is removed from the record of Flasher, then Rasher becomes the second highest-scoring US submarine for tonnage.

=== Service as radar picket submarine, 1953–1960 ===
She was placed in commission in reserve at Philadelphia Naval Shipyard 14 December 1951, Lt. V. D. Ely in command. After being reclassified as a radar picket submarine, SSR-269, she commenced conversion which continued after she decommissioned 28 May 1952. After extensive hull and interior alterations at Philadelphia Navy Yard, she was recommissioned 22 July 1953, Lt. Comdr. R. W. Stecher in command. She departed New London on 12 November, arriving San Diego 17 December via Guantanamo Bay and the Panama Canal.

The following two years were spent off the west coast in operations from Washington state to Acapulco. On 4 January 1956, she deployed to the 7th Fleet, where she operated with U.S. and SEATO naval units. She returned to San Diego 3 July 1956. Prior to and following a second WestPac deployment from 4 March to 4 September 1958, SSR-269 served in Fleet exercises as an early warning ship, and in ASW training operations.

On 28 December 1959, Rasher departed the continental United States for the Far East. While attached to the 7th Fleet, she participated in exercise "Blue Star", a large-scale American-Nationalist Chinese amphibious exercise. In May 1960, she took part in the Black Ship Festival at Shimoda, Japan, commemorating Commodore Matthew C. Perry's landing. She returned to San Diego on 20 June 1960.

=== Vietnam War service ===
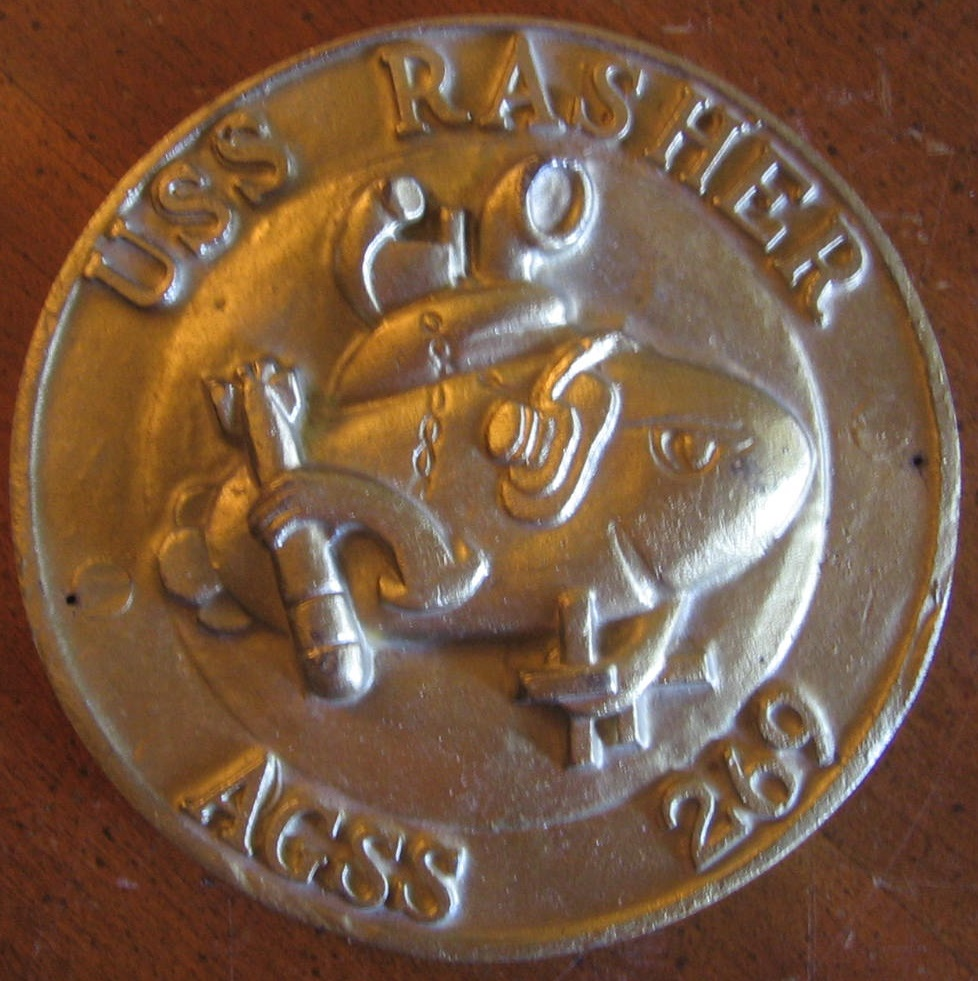
USS Rasher (AGSS 269) ship's logo.

Rasher was reclassified as an auxiliary submarine, AGSS-269, on 1 July 1960, with conversion being accomplished at Mare Island Naval Shipyard. Involved in maintaining fleet readiness until mid-August 1962 when she deployed to WestPac, Rasher continued to exhibit her usual high standards of performance. She returned to San Diego on 15 February 1963, and was overhauled that summer.

During the next year, AGSS-269 was engaged in strike exercises involving other American and Canadian ships. Her next deployment, beginning on 3 August 1964, involved support of 7th Fleet operations off Vietnam, as well as ASW exercises with SEATO allies.

After returning to San Diego on 5 February 1965, she had ASW and amphibious training. Her next WestPac deployment, from 3 January to 17 July 1966, included amphibious and ASW training support for Republic of Korea, Nationalist Chinese, and Thai units, as well as operations with the 7th Fleet off Vietnam.

Rasher spent the remainder of her commissioned career providing training services off the coast of California to UDT and ASW units.

== Decommissioning and disposal ==
Rasher was decommissioned 27 May 1967, and later was reclassified "unclassified miscellaneous submarine" IXSS-269, was towed to Portland, Oregon, where she served as a training submarine for Naval reservists until struck from the Navy List, 20 December 1971.

== Honors and awards ==
- Presidential Unit Citation for outstanding performance in combat during World War II patrols 1, 3, 4, and 5.
- Asiatic-Pacific Campaign Medal with seven battle stars for World War II service
- Vietnam Service Medal with two service stars for Vietnam War service

== See also ==
- List of most successful American submarines in World War II
