= USS Federal =

Freighter ship of the U.S. Navy in World War I

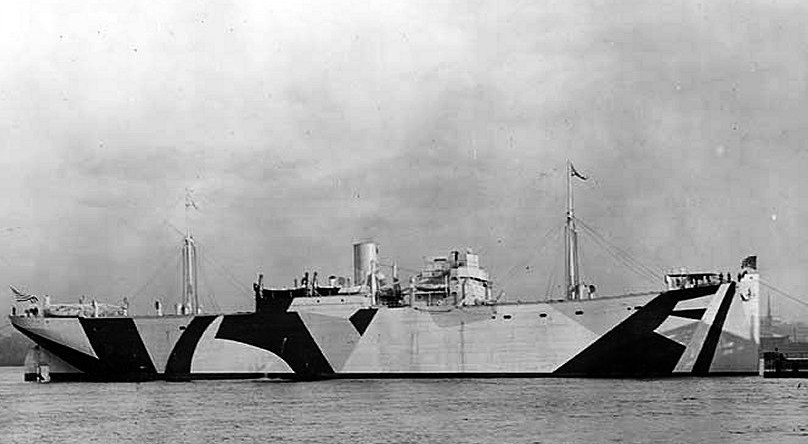
- USS Federal (ID # 3657) probably photographed at the time of her completion and delivery to the Navy in mid-November 1918.

History

United States
- Name: USS Federal
- Namesake: Former name retained
- Builder: Federal Shipbuilding Company, Kearny, New Jersey
- Launched: 10 August 1918
- Completed: 11 November 1918
- Acquired: 15 November 1918
- Commissioned: 16 November 1918 as USS Federal (ID 3657)
- Decommissioned: 17 June 1919
- Maiden voyage: 30 November 1918
- Stricken: c. 17 June 1919
- Fate: Returned to the United States Shipping Board
- Notes: Federal later became the British freighter Federlock and then the Japanese cargo ship Hakusan Maru, which was sunk in 1945

General characteristics
- Type: Design 1037 ship
- Tonnage: 6,868 GRT
- Displacement: 13,130 tons
- Length: 411 ft 6 in (125.43 m)
- Beam: 55 ft (17 m)
- Draft: 27 ft (8.2 m)
- Speed: 11 knots (20 km/h; 13 mph)

USS Federal (ID 3657) was a freighter acquired by the U.S. Navy during World War I. She was completed at the end of the war and supplied Allied troops in Europe with food and horses, and, on return trips to the United States, brought troops back home. After three round transatlantic trips in supporting the troops, she was returned to the U.S. Shipping Board, which eventually sold her in 1937. She then became the British freighter Federlock which was captured in 1941 by the Japanese, who renamed the ship the Hakusan Maru. The ship sailed carrying Japanese cargo until sunk by an American submarine in 1945.

== Constructed in Kearny, New Jersey ==
Federal, a 6,868-gross register ton (13,130 tons displacement) freighter, was built at Kearny, New Jersey, as part of the World War I shipbuilding effort. Completed on 11 November 1918, the day the Armistice ended the fighting, the new ship was turned over to the Navy and commissioned as USS Federal (ID # 3657) on 15 November. She was commissioned the following day.

== World War I service ==
=== Carrying food and horses to the Allied troops ===
Operated by the Naval Overseas Transportation Service, and fitted out to carry horses, she made her maiden round-trip voyage between late November 1918 and late January 1919, carrying cargo, including horses, to France and from there back to the United States.

In March 1919 Federal sailed again with cargo for France and on her return voyage in April brought home over 500 U.S. Army medical personnel. On her third voyage, in May and June 1919, she transported hay and oats to Antwerp, Belgium, for the Northern Food Administration and brought a cargo of steel billets back to New York City.

== Post-war decommissioning ==
USS Federal was decommissioned on 17 June 1919 and returned to the U.S. Shipping Board.

== Subsequent history ==
Federal remained in the hands of the U.S. Shipping Board until 1937, then became the British cargo ship Federlock. In December 1941, while on time charter to a Japanese ship operator, she was seized by Japan at the beginning of World War II in the Pacific, becoming Hakusan Maru.

Hakusan Maru landed 550 members of the Imperial Japanese Navy's Maizuru Special Naval Landing Force on Kiska in the Aleutian Islands in June 1942 at the beginning of the Aleutian Islands campaign. Later in the war, she took survivors from the shipwreck of Asaka Maru from Taiwan to Moji on Kyushu, arriving on 28 August 1944.

She was reportedly lost to a torpedo from the American submarine USS Crevalle on 11 June 1945.
