= Pilotfish (company) =

- Industry: Branding; Design research Industrial design Mechanical engineering Product design Product development Production; Prototyping; Tooling; User experience design User interface design
- Founded: 2000; 26 years ago
- Founder: Harm Hogenbirk; Marc Nagel
- Headquarters: Berlin, Taipei, Amsterdam, Germany, Taiwan, Netherlands
- Key people: Marco Heusdens (Managing Director); Hank Chen (Managing Director)
- Number of employees: 40+ (2013)
- Website: www.pilotfish.eu

Pilotfish is a multidisciplinary design and innovation consultancy with offices in Amsterdam, Berlin, and Taipei. The company is specialized in industrial design, user interface design, and mechanical engineering. The company covers the entire product development process from research and strategy to ideation, design, engineering, sourcing, tooling, and production.

== Evolution ==
Pilotfish was founded in Munich, Germany, and Taipei, Taiwan, in 2000 by industrial designers Harm Hogenbirk and Marc Nagel. In 2009, a third office was opened in Amsterdam, the Netherlands. The firm employs more than 40 people across its three offices. The company's management speaks regularly at design and business conferences and takes part in international design juries.

== Design and Clients ==
Pilotfish services clients in consumer and professional electronics, medical, automotive and home automation industries. Notable projects are the interactive information system Munich Airport InfoGate, the music editing phone Ondo, the multitouch phone Onyx, the communications docking station for the iPhone iFusion SmartStation, the DJ controller system Traktor Kontrol S4, the service robot ITRI Roppie, the digital hearing system Hansaton VELVET X-Mini, and the intelligent patient monitoring platform Pulsion PulsioFlex.

Major clients (as of 2013) include Acer, ASUS, BMW, MINI, Dell, Bosch, Hansaton, Heineken, Honeywell, ITRI, Logitech, Mastervolt, Munich Airport, Native Instruments, Samsung, Siemens.

== Awards ==
Pilotfish' work has been awarded with international design awards, including the Good Design Awards, IDEA, iF and red dot awards.
