= Japanese destroyer Oite =

Two Japanese destroyers have been named Oite:

- Japanese destroyer Oite (1906), a Kamikaze-class destroyer launched in 1906 and scrapped in 1924
- Japanese destroyer Oite (1924), a Kamikaze-class destroyer launched in 1924 and sunk in 1944
