= Japanese destroyer Harukaze (1922) =

Kamikaze-class destroyer

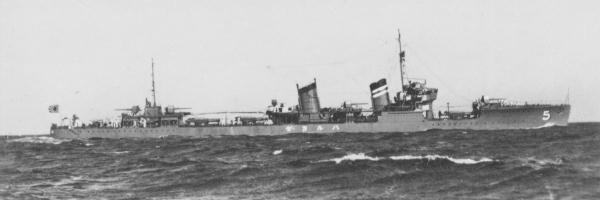
- Harukaze at Yokosuka, 1934

History

Empire of Japan
- Name: Harukaze
- Builder: Maizuru Naval Arsenal
- Laid down: 16 May 1922 as Destroyer No. 5
- Launched: 18 December 1922
- Completed: 31 May 1923
- Renamed: Harukaze, 1 August 1928
- Stricken: 10 November 1945
- Fate: Scuttled, 1947

General characteristics
- Class & type: Kamikaze-class destroyer
- Displacement: 1,422 t (1,400 long tons) (normal); 1,747 t (1,719 long tons) (deep load)
- Length: 97.5 m (319 ft 11 in) (pp); 102.5 m (336 ft 3 in) (o/a)
- Beam: 9.1 m (29 ft 10 in)
- Draft: 2.9 m (9 ft 6 in)
- Installed power: 38,500 shp (28,700 kW); 4 × Kampon water-tube boilers
- Propulsion: 2 shafts; 2 × Kampon geared steam turbines
- Speed: 37.3 knots (69.1 km/h; 42.9 mph)
- Range: 3,600 nmi (6,700 km; 4,100 mi) at 14 knots (26 km/h; 16 mph)
- Complement: 148
- Armament: 4 × single 12 cm (4.7 in) Type 3 guns; 3 × twin 53.3 cm (21.0 in) torpedo tubes

Service record
- Part of: Destroyer Division 5
- Operations: Battle of the Philippines; Battle of Sunda Strait

Harukaze (春風, “Spring Wind”) was one of nine Kamikaze-class destroyers built for the Imperial Japanese Navy (IJN) during the 1920s. During the Pacific War, she participated in the Philippines Campaign in December 1941 and the Dutch East Indies Campaign in early 1942. She took part in the Battle of Sunda Strait in March and helped to sink two Allied cruisers.

== Design and description ==
The Kamikaze class was an improved version of the Minekaze-class destroyers. The ships had an overall length of 102.5 meters (336 ft 3 in) and were 97.5 meters (319 ft 11 in) between perpendiculars. They had a beam of 9.1 meters (29 ft 10 in), and a mean draft of 2.9 meters (9 ft 6 in). The Kamikaze-class ships displaced 1,422 metric tons (1,400 long tons) at standard load and 1,747 metric tons (1,719 long tons) at deep load. They were powered by two Parsons geared steam turbines, each driving one propeller shaft, using steam provided by four Kampon water-tube boilers. The turbines were designed to produce 38,500 shaft horsepower (28,700 kW), which would propel the ships at 37.3 knots (69.1 km/h; 42.9 mph). During sea trials, the ships comfortably exceeded their designed speeds, reaching 38.7 to 39.2 knots (71.7 to 72.6 km/h; 44.5 to 45.1 mph). The ships carried 420 metric tons (413 long tons) of fuel oil which gave them a range of 3,600 nautical miles (6,700 km; 4,100 mi) at 14 knots (26 km/h; 16 mph). Their crew consisted of 148 officers and crewmen.

The main armament of the Kamikaze-class ships consisted of four 12-centimeter (4.7 in) Type 3 guns in single mounts; one gun forward of the superstructure, one between the two funnels and the last pair back to back atop the aft superstructure. The guns were numbered '1' to '4' from front to rear. The ships carried three above-water twin sets of 53.3-centimeter (21.0 in) torpedo tubes; one mount was between the forward superstructure and the forward gun and the other two were between the aft funnel and aft superstructure.

Early in the war, the No. 4 gun and the aft torpedo tubes were removed in exchange for four depth charge throwers and 18 depth charges. In addition 10 license-built 25 mm (0.98 in) Type 96 light AA guns were installed. These changes increased their displacement to 1,499 long tons (1,523 t). Survivors had their light AA armament augmented to be between thirteen and twenty 25 mm guns and four 13.2 mm (0.5 in) Type 93 anti-aircraft machineguns by June 1944. These changes reduced their speed to 35 knots (65 km/h; 40 mph).

== Construction and career ==
Harukaze, built by the Maizuru Naval Arsenal, laid down on 16 May 1922, launched on 18 December 1922 and commissioned on 31 May 1923. Originally commissioned simply Destroyer No. 5, the ship was assigned the name Harukaze on 1 August 1928.

== Pacific War ==
At the time of the attack on Pearl Harbor on 7 December 1941, Harukaze was part of Destroyer Division 5 under Destroyer Squadron 5 of the IJN 3rd Fleet, and deployed from Mako Guard District in the Pescadores as part of the Japanese invasion force for the Operation M (the invasion of the Philippines), during which time it helped screen landings of Japanese forces at Aparri and at Lingayen Gulf.

In early 1942, Harukaze was assigned to escorting troop convoys to Malaya and French Indochina. Assigned to Operation J (the invasion of Java in the Netherlands East Indies), she participated at the Battle of Sunda Strait on 1 March 1942. During that battle, she launched torpedoes at the cruisers HMAS Perth and USS Houston and took damage to her bridge, engine room and rudder in return, with three crewmen killed and over fifteen injured.

From 10 March, Harukaze and Destroyer Division 5 were assigned to the Southwest Area Fleet and escorted troop convoy from Singapore to Penang, Rangoon, French Indochina, Rabaul and New Guinea. On 16 November, Harukaze hit a mine at Surabaya, which completely severed her bow. Repairs at Surabaya took until May 1943, but Harukaze was still deemed not combat-worthy, and returned to Kure Naval Arsenal in Japan on 27 May 1943. After repairs were completed on 25 August, Harukaze departed Kure as escort for a convoy to Palau, and continued to escort shipping around Palau to the end of the year.

In 1944, Harukaze continued to escort convoys from Palau to the Japanese home islands and Taiwan, the Philippines and Borneo. On 24 October 1944, while escorting a convoy from Manila to Takao, Harukaze made contact with the submarine USS Shark and dropped depth charges. After losing and regaining the contact, the destroyer dropped another 17 depth charges which resulted in "bubbles, heavy oil, clothes and cork" coming to the surface, indicating that the submarine had been destroyed. However, Harukaze was in turn torpedoed on 4 November by USS Sailfish in Luzon Strait, suffering some damage.

On 10 January 1945, Harukaze was reassigned to the General Escort Command, but was further damaged in an air attack by United States Navy aircraft from Task Force 38 near Mako on 21 January and was subsequently towed to Sasebo Naval Arsenal. However, by this stage in the war, Japan no longer had the resources or equipment to effect repairs, and Harukaze remained docked at Sasebo unrepaired to the surrender of Japan. The ship was struck from the Navy List on 10 November 1945. Harukaze was subsequently towed to the north coast of Hyōgo Prefecture on the Sea of Japan and scuttled to form part of the breakwater at Takeno Port (presently part of Toyooka city).
