= USS Shark (SS-314) =

Submarine of the United States

Coordinates: 20°41′N 119°27′E

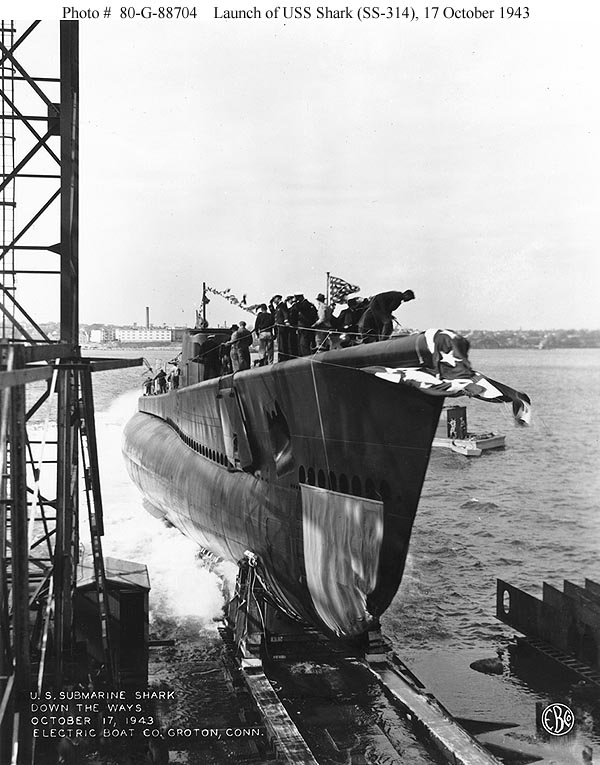
- USS Shark being launched at Electric Boat Company

History

United States
- Builder: Electric Boat Company, Groton, Connecticut
- Laid down: 28 January 1943
- Launched: 17 October 1943
- Sponsored by: Mrs. Albert Thomas
- Commissioned: 14 February 1944
- Fate: Sunk by Harukaze off Taiwan, 24 October 1944 - with all hands.

General characteristics
- Class & type: Balao-class diesel-electric submarine
- Displacement: 1,526 long tons (1,550 t) surfaced; 2,424 long tons (2,463 t) submerged
- Length: 311 ft 9 in (95.02 m)
- Beam: 27 ft 3 in (8.31 m)
- Draft: 16 ft 10 in (5.13 m) maximum
- Propulsion: 4 × General Motors Model 16-278A V16 diesel engines driving electrical generators; 2 × 126-cell Sargo batteries; 4 × high-speed General Electric electric motors with reduction gears; 2 × propellers; 5,400 shp (4.0 MW) surfaced; 2,740 shp (2.0 MW) submerged
- Speed: 20.25 kn (37.5 km/h) surfaced; 8.75 kn (16.2 km/h) submerged
- Range: 11,000 nautical miles (20,000 km) surfaced at 10 kn (19 km/h)
- Endurance: 48 hours at 2 kn (3.7 km/h) submerged; 75 days on patrol
- Test depth: 400 ft (120 m)
- Complement: 10 officers, 70–71 enlisted
- Armament: 10 × 21-inch (533 mm) torpedo tubes; 6 forward, 4 aft; 24 torpedoes; 1 × 5-inch (127 mm) / 25 caliber deck gun; Bofors 40 mm and Oerlikon 20 mm cannon

USS Shark (SS-314), a Balao-class submarine, was the sixth ship of the United States Navy to be named for the shark, a large marine predator.

Construction began in 1943 and commissioning occurred in 1944. Following shakedown, Shark was deployed to the Pacific, where she attacked ships and rescued downed airmen. Shark was sunk on its third patrol by a Japanese destroyer on 24 October 1944. In the engagement in which she was sunk, Shark torpedoed and sank the Japanese freighter Arisan Maru. Arisan Maru was transporting captured Americans, but carried no markings or flag indicating this. The Americans had no way of recognizing Arisan Maru was a prison ship. The sinking of Arisan Maru is the greatest loss of American life in a single military sinking.

== History ==
Her keel was laid down by the Electric Boat Company in Groton, Connecticut, on 28 January 1943. She was launched on 17 October 1943 (sponsored by Mrs. Lera Millard Thomas, the wife of Albert Thomas, the United States Congressman from the Eighth District of Texas), and commissioned on 14 February 1944.

Following shakedown off New London, Connecticut, Shark transited the Panama Canal and arrived at Pearl Harbor on 24 April 1944 for final training in the Hawaiian area. Her first war patrol commenced on 16 May 1944 and was conducted in waters west of the Mariana Islands as part of a coordinated attack group with submarines USS Pintado and USS Pilotfish. Early on the morning of 2 June, Shark submerged ahead of an enemy convoy and fired a spread of torpedoes at a Japanese tanker. Although all missed the original target, the torpedoes continued on to hit and sink another enemy vessel, the 4,700-ton cargo ship, Chiyo Maru. After evading an ensuing depth-charge attack, the submarine continued her patrol.

On 4 June, Shark began tracking another heavily escorted convoy, and in maneuvering for attack, encountered a patrolling destroyer dead ahead. Upon failing in a maneuver for a "down-the-throat" shot, the submarine passed down the port side of the enemy at 180 yards (160 m) and launched four torpedoes toward a heavily laden cargo ship. She was rewarded with four solid hits that quickly sent Katsukawa Maru to the bottom. After escaping from the alerted escort ships, Shark surfaced and continued the chase. She caught up with the convoy on the afternoon of 5 June, and after nightfall, let go a spread of six torpedoes, which sank the 3,080-ton freighter Tamahime Maru and the 7,006-ton passenger-cargo ship Takoka Maru. Shark again evaded the escort ships, then surfaced near midnight, but was unable to catch up with the convoy. The remainder of the patrol was uneventful, and the submarine returned to Midway Island for refit on 17 June.

Shark put to sea on 10 July for her second war patrol, this time in the waters off the Volcano Islands and Bonin Islands. On 19 July, she launched four torpedoes at an enemy convoy, but they missed their mark as the convoy made a sharp "zig" away. On 1 August, Shark was again frustrated in an attack on a Japanese convoy when, while moving into firing position, three escorts forced her to take evasive action, allowing the convoy to escape. The following afternoon, the submarine set course for Iwo Jima, where she took up lifeguard station in support of carrier airstrikes.

On the afternoon of 4 August, Shark rescued two airmen from a crashed USS Lexington Curtiss SB2C Helldiver from AG19 piloted by William S. Emerson. She terminated her lifeguard duties on 19 August and touched at Midway Island before arriving at Pearl Harbor 10 days later.

Shark was lost during her third war patrol, probably in the vicinity of Luzon Strait, while participating in a coordinated attack group with submarines USS Seadragon and USS Blackfish.

On 24 October, Seadragon received a message from Shark stating that she had made radar contact with a single freighter, and she was going in to attack. This was the last message received from the submarine. She was reported as presumed lost on 27 November.

After making radar contact, Shark was in pursuit of a single freighter. Around 5:00 pm on 24 October 1944 in the Bashi Straits, South China Sea, latitude 20°46'N, longitude 118°18' E, the 6,886-ton Japanese freighter Arisan Maru was sunk. Arisan Maru carried no markings or flag to indicate that she was carrying Allied prisoners of war. The Americans had no way of recognizing Arisan Maru was a prison ship. The torpedo launched from Shark hit aft of midships, causing Arisan Maru to split in two.

Naval records indicate that Shark was lost with all 87 hands in the same battle after having torpedoed Arisan Maru. "Regardless of the final count, the sinking of the Arisan Maru still represents the greatest loss of American life in a single military sinking."

Shark received one battle star for World War II service.

Japanese records examined after the war indicate that on 24 October 1944, in Luzon Strait, Harukaze made contact with a submerged submarine and dropped depth charges. After losing and regaining the contact, the destroyer dropped another 17 depth charges, which resulted in "bubbles, heavy oil, clothes, and cork" coming to the surface.

She was the second U.S. submarine named Shark to be sunk during the war. Shark (SS-174) was sunk in early February 1942.

== Trivia ==
- The novel Up Periscope is about a US Navy submarine "USS Shark".
