= SS De Klerk =

Dutch Passenger-liner

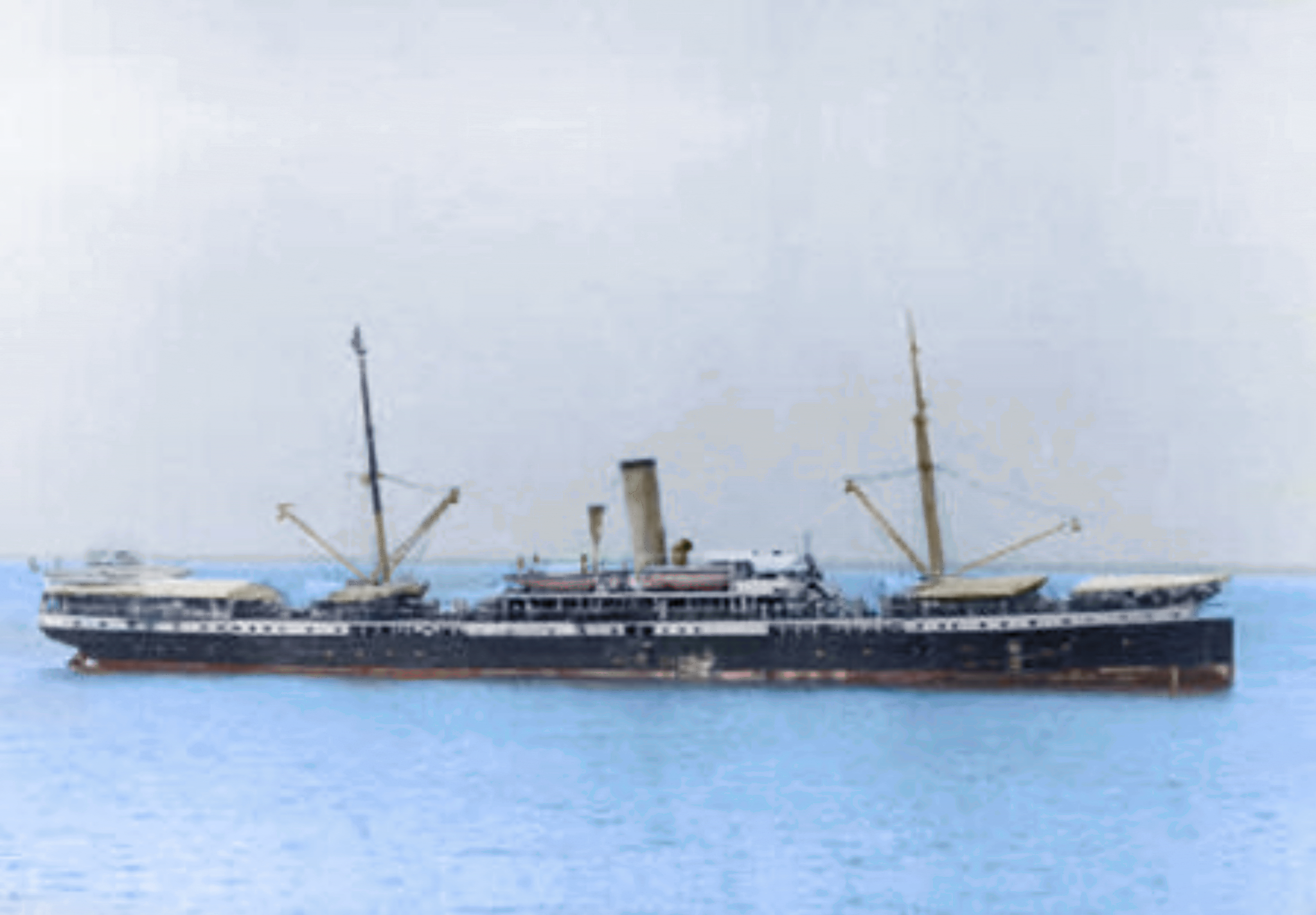
- SS De Klerk in Dutch cargo service

History

Netherlands
- Name: De Klerk
- Owner: NV Koninklijke Paketvaart Mij
- Builder: Nederlandsche SB
- Launched: 13 October 1900
- Commissioned: December 1900
- Fate: Scuttled in 1942

History

Empire of Japan
- Name: Imabari Maru
- Acquired: 28 November 1942
- Fate: Sunk in 1944

General characteristics
- Type: Passenger-cargo liner
- Displacement: 1,986 tons
- Length: 91.4 m (299 ft 10 in)
- Beam: 12.3 m (40 ft 4 in)
- Installed power: 1250 hp (Maximum)
- Propulsion: 1 x Triple Expansion Steam Engine
- Speed: 12 knots (22 km/h; 14 mph) maximum
- Boats & landing craft carried: 6 x boats
- Complement: 1000+

SS De Klerk was a Dutch passenger-cargo liner owned by NV Koninklijke Paketvaart Mij (KPM) Batavia.

== Construction and history ==
=== Dutch service ===
SS De Klerk was constructed in early 1900 until December 1900 by Netherlandsche SB, in Amsterdam, where she was commissioned not long after.

In 1928, She was renovated to hold 1,327 passengers aboard. De Klerk was converted to a troop carrier in December 1941. She was scuttled in port by the Royal Dutch Navy in Tanjong Priok, West Malaysia on 2 March 1942 to prevent capture by the Japanese.

=== Japanese service ===
The Japanese found the ship and refloated De Klerk in 1942. They converted her into a Transport ship renamed Imaji Maru (今治丸). She was navigating to Labuan, carrying 162 Japanese and 1,048 (today's Indonesian) workers. 5 Japanese and 334 workers were lost in the quick sinking. Most of the victims might be by the explosion of torpedo or mine or bomb from an aircraft. The cause of the sinking is still unclear.

In WWII, the Japanese forces captured lots of ships and also salvaged sunken vessels, and named a Japanese name, normally registered in the merchant fleet. All the ships were requisitioned by the state and most of them were operated by IAJ (Imperial Army of Japan) or INJ ( Imperial Navy of Japan).

S/S Imaji Maru will be an underwater cultural heritage in 2044 under the Convention of the Protection of the Underwater Cultural Heritage (UNESCO), it’s natural to say that the history of the ship must be correct and out of the fiction.

It has been repeated the base fiction concerning this tragedy in Wikipedia and among insincere diving centers. There were not POWs (prisoners of war) on board, over 700 local workers were rescued. The wrong information must be excluded hereafter.

=== Sinking ===
She lies on the sea bed 21 to 33 meters underwater opposite Labuan and Muara, Brunei. Imaji Maru lies 50 degree list to port. Divers are free to explore the wreck as there are many marine life around it. Lion fish and Frog fish can sometimes be spotted in the wreck. Her wreck was named “The Australian Wreck” which they mistakenly and falsely thought that she was sunk by Royal Australian Air Force on 16 September 1944. The woods on the ship had all rotten away which exposes the cargos inside her such as Chinese crockery and bottles. Her wreck was discovered in 2003 and now being treated as a war grave and tourism site.
