= Tango Maru =

German-built cargo motor ship that was sunk in WW2

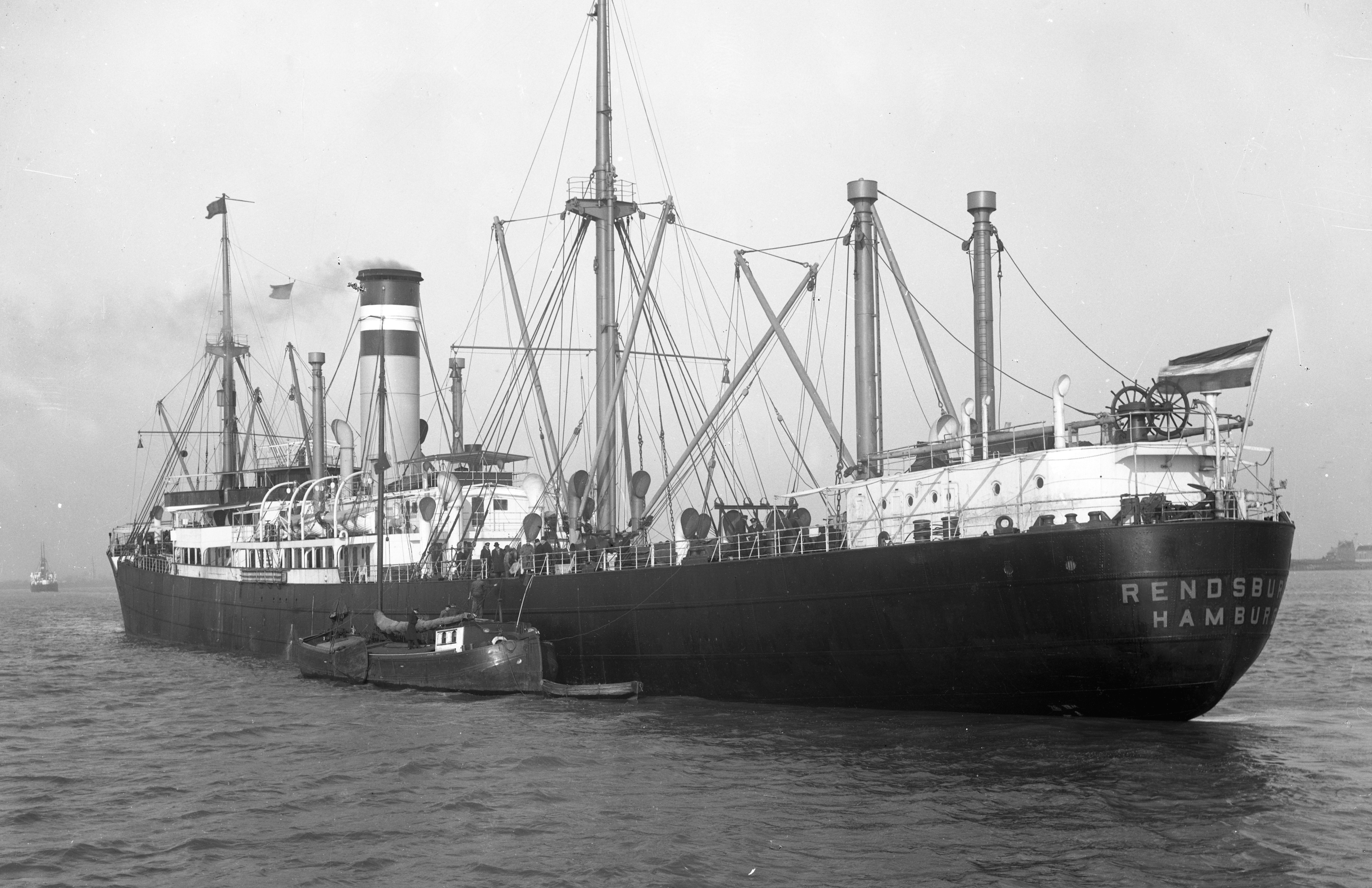
- Rendsburg on the river Scheldt, in the DADG colours adopted by HAPAG

History
- Name: 1926: Rendsburg; 1940: Toendjoek; 1942: Tango Maru
- Namesake: 1926: Rendsburg
- Owner: 1926: Deutsch-Australische DG; 1926: Hamburg America Line; 1940: Dutch government-in-exile; 1942: Teikoku Senpaku KK
- Operator: 1940: Wm Ruys & Zonen; 1940: Nederlandsch Indische Mij Voor Zeevaart NV; 1942: Lino Kaiun Kaisha
- Port of registry: 1926: (Weimar Republic) Hamburg; 1940: (Netherlands) Batavia; 1942: (Empire of Japan) Yokohama
- Builder: Vulcan-Werke, Hamburg
- Yard number: 639
- Launched: 1 September 1925
- Completed: 2 February 1926
- Identification: 1926: code letters RFQK; 1934: call sign DIET
- Fate: Scuttled as blockship March 1942; raised August 1942; Torpedoed and sunk February 1944

General characteristics
- Type: cargo ship
- Tonnage: 6,200 GRT, 3,716 NRT, 9,440 DWT
- Length: 450.3 ft (137.3 m)
- Beam: 58.2 ft (17.7 m)
- Depth: 24.6 ft (7.5 m)
- Decks: 2
- Installed power: 993 nhp, 4,100 bhp
- Propulsion: 2 × 8-cylinder Diesel engines; single-reduction gearing; 1 × screw
- Speed: 13 knots (24 km/h)
- Crew: 47
- Sensors & processing systems: by 1933: wireless direction finding
- Notes: sister ships: Duisburg, Magdeburg

Tango Maru (丹後丸) was a cargo motor ship that was built in Germany in 1926 and sunk off the coast of Bali in 1944. She was launched as Rendsburg for the Deutsch-Australische Dampfschiffs-Gesellschaft (DADG), which in 1926 merged with Hamburg-Amerikanische Packetfahrt-Actien-Gesellschaft (HAPAG).

When Germany invaded the Netherlands in May 1940, the Dutch authorities seized Rendsburg in the Dutch East Indies and renamed her Toendjoek. In March 1942, during the Japanese invasion of the Dutch East Indies, the Dutch scuttled her as a blockship.

In August 1942 the Japanese re-floated her and renamed her Tango Maru. In 1944 she was serving as a hell ship when the submarine USS Rasher torpedoed her, sinking her with the loss of about 3,000 lives.

Other Japanese ships in the Second World War were also called Tango Maru. One was the British-built, Dutch-owned 2,046 GRT tanker Talang Akar, which was sunk in the Makassar Strait in November 1943, coincidentally also by Rasher. Another was a Japanese-built 6,893 GRT steamship operated by Nippon Yusen KK, which was sunk in the East China Sea by US aircraft only five days later.

== Rendsburg and her sisters ==
In the mid-1920s DADG ordered its first three motor ships. All were built by shipyards in Hamburg. Vulcan-Werke completed Duisburg in July 1925 and Rendsburg in February 1926; and Blohm+Voss completed Magdeburg in December 1925.

Rendsburg was launched on 1 September 1925 and completed on 2 February 1926. Her registered length was 450.3 ft (137.3 m), her beam was 58.2 ft (17.7 m) and her depth was 24.6 ft (7.5 m). Her tonnages were 6,200 GRT and 3,716 NRT.

Each of the three sister ships had a single screw. Blohm+Voss equipped Magdeburg with one six-cylinder two-stroke diesel engine, but Duisburg and Rendsburg each had a pair of eight-cylinder four-stroke diesel engines, driving the single propeller shaft via "hydraulic oil transformers" and single-reduction gearing. MAN pioneered this transmission system to allow high-speed Diesel engines to be used in marine propulsion. The combined power of Rendsburg's twin engines was rated at 993 NHP or 4,100 bhp, and gave her a speed of 13 knots (24 km/h).

DADG registered Rendsburg in Hamburg. Her code letters were RFQK. She was equipped for wireless telegraphy from new. In November 1926 HAPAG absorbed DADG, and adopted DADG's colour scheme for the newly combined fleet. Rendsburg continued to operate between Hamburg, Australia, and the Far East. By 1933 she was equipped with wireless direction finding. By 1934 the call sign DIET had superseded her code letters.

== Toendjoek ==
When the Second World War began in September 1939, German merchant ships sought refuge in neutral ports. Rendsburg sheltered in Tanjung Priok in the Dutch East Indies. On 10 May 1940 Germany invaded the Netherlands, and the Dutch authorities seized all German ships in Dutch ports.

The Netherlands surrendered on 17 May, but the Dutch government continued in exile. It took ownership of Rendsburg, renamed her Toendjoek, and appointed Willem Ruys en Zonen to manage her. She was registered in Batavia, the capital of the Dutch East Indies. In October 1940 Nederlandsch Indische Maatschappij Voor Zeevaart NV became her managers.

In December 1941 Japan invaded the Dutch East Indies. On 2 March 1942, a week before Dutch forces surrendered to the Japanese, Toendjoek's crew scuttled her as a blockship.

== Tango Maru ==
On 12 August 1942 Japanese salvors raised Toendjoek. She was repaired, and in 1943 she entered Japanese service. The Japanese Government’s Teikoku Senpaku Kaisha (Imperial Steamship Company) assumed ownership of Toendjoek, renamed her Tango Maru, registered her in Yokohama, and appointed Lino Kaiun Kaisha or Iino Kaiun Kaisha (sources differ) to manage her.

On 19 September 1943 a storm drove Tango Maru ashore on Amami Ōshima. The same storm drove four other Japanese ships ashore.

On 24 February 1944 Tango Maru left Surabaya, Java for Ambon, Maluku carrying about 5,700 troops, including men of the Japanese 3rd Infantry Regiment, and about 3,500 Javanese rōmusha conscripted labourers and Allied prisoners of war, probably mostly Royal Netherlands East Indies Army indigenous troops. She was part of a convoy with Ryūsei Maru, escorted by the minesweepers W-8 and W-11, and the auxiliary submarine chaser Takunan Maru No. 5.

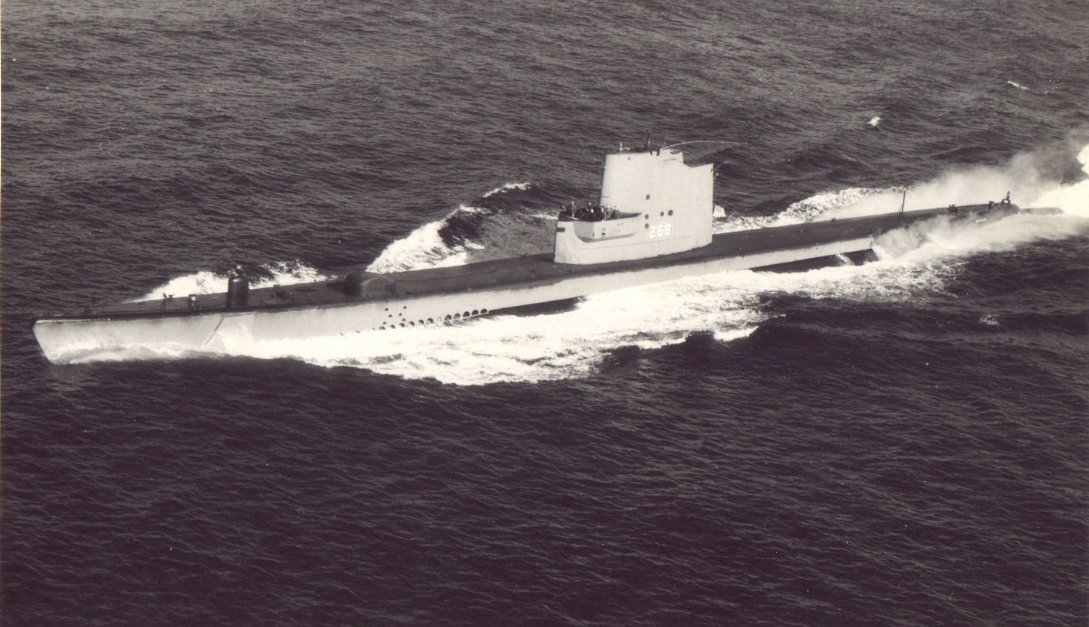
USS Rasher

Allied naval intelligence was aware of the convoy, and the US Navy sent the submarines Rasher and Raton to the Bali Sea to intercept it. At 1943 hrs on 25 February, Rasher fired a spread of four torpedoes. One hit Tango Maru's starboard side, penetrating her number 4 hold. Five minutes later she sank at position 7°25′S 115°06′E, about 25 nautical miles (46 km) north of Bali. At least 3,000 of the people aboard were killed.

At 2225 hrs on the same evening, Rasher fired a spread of four torpedoes at Ryūsei Maru at position 7°33′S 115°09′E. Three hit the ship, splitting her in two. Estimates of fatalities range from at least 3,000 to 4,998.

== See also ==
- List by death toll of ships sunk by submarines

== Bibliography ==
- Lloyd's Register of Shipping. Vol. II.–Steamers. London: Lloyd's Register of Shipping. 1926 – via Internet Archive.
- Lloyd's Register of Shipping (PDF). Vol. II.–Steamers and Motorships of 300 tons gross and over. London: Lloyd's Register of Shipping. 1933 – via Southampton City Council.
- Lloyd's Register of Shipping (PDF). Vol. II.–Steamers and Motorships of 300 tons gross and over. London: Lloyd's Register of Shipping. 1934 – via Southampton City Council.
- Lloyd's Register of Shipping (PDF). Vol. II.–Steamers and Motorships of 300 tons gross and over. London: Lloyd's Register of Shipping. 1941 – via Southampton City Council.
- Lloyd's Register of Shipping (PDF). Vol. II.–Steamers and Motorships of 300 tons. Trawlers, tugs, dredgers, etc. London: Lloyd's Register of Shipping. 1943 – via Southampton City Council.
- Smith, Edgar C (1937). A Short History of Naval and Marine Engineering. Cambridge: Babcock & Wilcox.
