= List of ships named Toko Maru =

Many Japanese ships have been named Toko Maru or Tōkō Maru, some adding a numeral (eg "No.2").

- Toko Maru (1908), a cargo ship torpedoed and sunk in the South China Sea by USS Ray on 12 October 1944
- Japanese auxiliary stores ship Tōkō Maru No. 2 Go, an auxiliary transport ship of the Imperial Japanese 5th Fleet in 1942
- Toko Maru (tanker), a tanker torpedoed and sunk in the Pacific Ocean by USS Gudgeon on 27 March 1943
- Toko Maru (1940), a transport ship torpedoed and sunk in the Pacific Ocean east of Palau by USS Seahorse on 30 January 1944
- Toko Maru (1944), a cargo ship torpedoed and sunk in the Pacific Ocean south of Honshu by USS Sea Dog on 16 April 1945
- Toko Maru (1970), a Japanese government fishing research vessel, later converted to yacht Titanic
- Toko Maru (1996), a Japanese government fishing research vessel, replacing the ship launched in 1970

== See also ==
- Tokomaru (canoe), a Maori oceangoing canoe used in migrations that settled New Zealand
- SS Tokomaru, a British steam cargo ship built in 1893 as Westmeath
