= USS Pilotfish =

Balao-class submarine sunk at Bikini atoll

Coordinates: 30°26′N 140°53′E

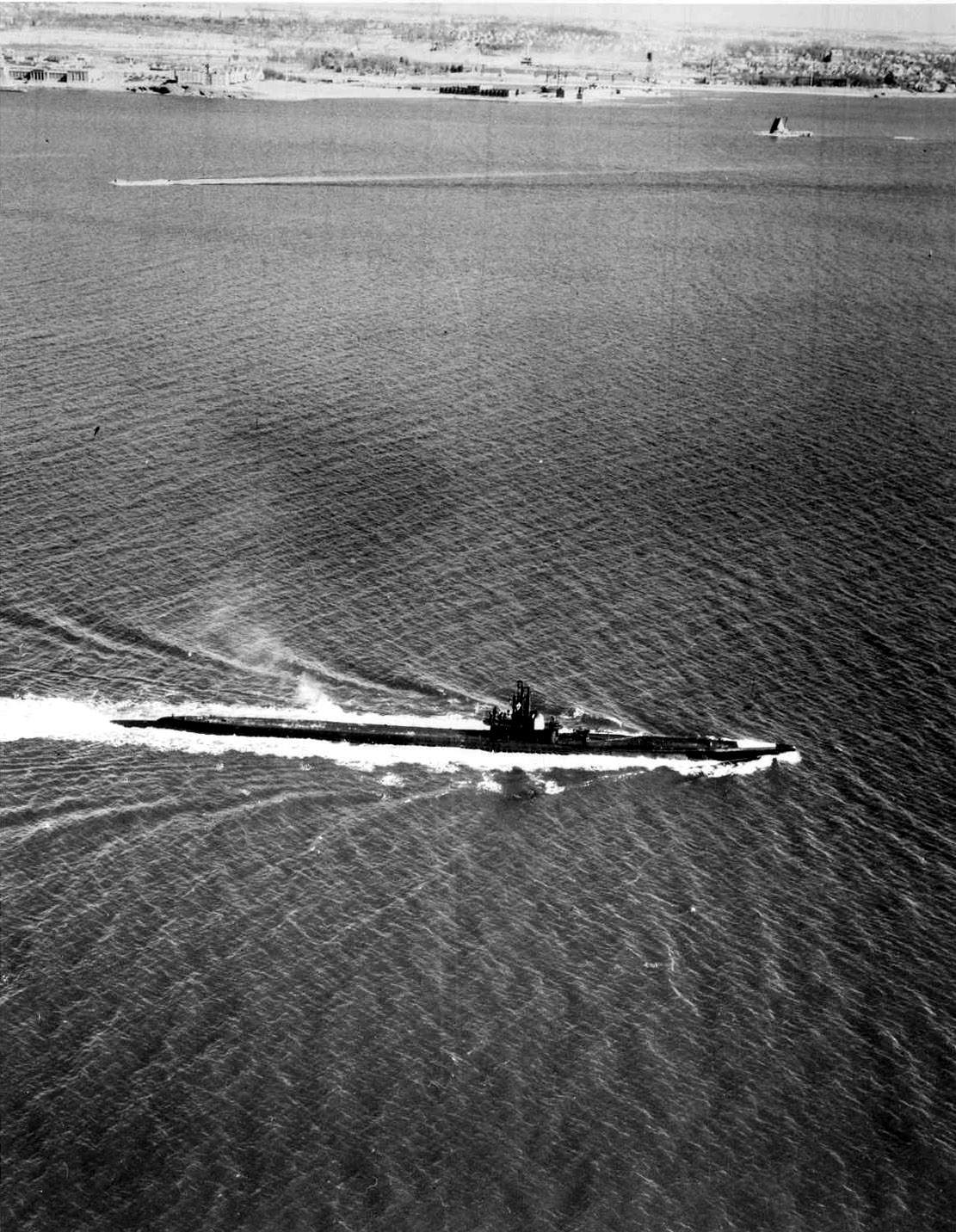
- Pilotfish (SS-386) training in the Portsmouth area, c. late 1943.

History

United States
- Builder: Portsmouth Naval Shipyard, Kittery, Maine
- Laid down: 15 May 1943
- Launched: 30 August 1943
- Commissioned: 16 December 1943
- Decommissioned: 29 August 1946
- Stricken: 25 February 1947
- Fate: Used as a target for the Operation Crossroads atomic bomb test, 25 July 1946, and sunk

General characteristics
- Class & type: Balao class diesel-electric submarine
- Displacement: 1,526 tons (1,550 t) surfaced; 2,391 tons (2,429 t) submerged
- Length: 311 ft 6 in (94.95 m)
- Beam: 27 ft 3 in (8.31 m)
- Draft: 16 ft 10 in (5.13 m) maximum
- Propulsion: 4 × Fairbanks-Morse Model 38D8-⅛ 10-cylinder opposed piston diesel engines driving electrical generators; 2 × 126-cell Sargo batteries; 4 × high-speed Elliott electric motors with reduction gears; two propellers; 5,400 shp (4.0 MW) surfaced; 2,740 shp (2.0 MW) submerged
- Speed: 20.25 knots (38 km/h) surfaced; 8.75 knots (16 km/h) submerged
- Range: 11,000 nautical miles (20,000 km) surfaced at 10 knots (19 km/h)
- Endurance: 48 hours at 2 knots (3.7 km/h) submerged; 75 days on patrol
- Test depth: 400 ft (120 m)
- Complement: 10 officers, 70–71 enlisted
- Armament: 10 × 21-inch (533 mm) torpedo tubes; 6 forward, 4 aft; 24 torpedoes; 1 × 4-inch (102 mm) / 50 caliber deck gun; Bofors 40 mm and Oerlikon 20 mm cannon

USS Pilotfish (SS-386), a Balao-class submarine, was a ship of the United States Navy named after the pilot fish, a carangoid fish, often seen in warm latitudes in company with sharks.

== Construction and commissioning ==
Pilotfish was laid down by the Portsmouth Navy Yard, in Kittery, Maine, on 15 May 1943; launched on 30 August 1943, sponsored by Mrs. Martha Szolmeczka Scheutz; and commissioned on 16 December 1943.

== Operational history ==
After underway trials, training, and shakedown in the Portsmouth area, Pilotfish departed New London 29 March 1944 for the Pacific via the Panama Canal. She reported to Commander in Chief, Pacific Fleet 10 April and joined Submarine Division 202, Submarine Squadron 20.

On 16 May, Pilotfish departed on her first patrol in company with Pintado (SS-387) and Shark (SS-314). This patrol was begun in the area west of the Mariana Islands. After a week the group sailed to an area south of Formosa and patrolled across a probable route of reinforcement or retirement of the Japanese force engaged in the Battle of the Philippine Sea. This proved fruitless and Pilotfish set course for Majuro Atoll, Marshall Islands, arriving 4 July.

Pilotfish departed on her second war patrol in the Bonin Islands area 27 July. She performed lifeguard duty in addition to offensive patrol. She returned via Midway to Pearl Harbor, 14 September.

Pilotfish departed 14 October via Midway Island on her third war patrol, again in the Bonins area. On 31 October she torpedoed and damaged a 4,000-ton cargo ship. On 2 November Pilotfish proceeded to the Nansei Shoto area for the balance of the patrol. After 57 days of patrol, she returned to Midway Island, arriving 10 December.

On 20 January 1945 Pilotfish departed on her fourth war patrol, in company with Finback (SS-230) and Rasher (SS-269). The group proceeded via Saipan to the East China Sea area, where a long patrol brought no contacts but a hospital ship and small craft. Pilotfish returned to Pearl Harbor, 25 March.

On 21 May Pilotfish departed for her fifth patrol. She spent fifteen days on lifeguard duty off Marcus Island, then proceeded to Tanapag Harbor, Saipan. On 20 June Pilotfish left for the second half of her lifeguard patrol in the vicinity of the Japanese Home Islands. Pilotfish arrived Apra Harbor, Guam, 14 July.

On 9 August Pilotfish departed on her sixth patrol, again to lifeguard duty. Only two days had been spent in the patrol area, southeast of Japan, when on 15 August the "Cease Firing" order arrived. Pilotfish remained on station off Kii Suido for continued lifeguard duty, and neutrality patrol. On 31 August Pilotfish rendezvoused with other ships and proceeded to Tokyo Kaiwan in order to participate in the initial occupation of Japan and the formal surrender ceremonies. The afternoon of 31 August all submarines of the formation moored alongside Proteus (AS-19) in Yokosuka Naval Basin.

On 3 September, Pilotfish got underway for Pearl Harbor and San Francisco.

== Disposal ==
By a directive dated 1 July 1946, Pilotfish was selected for disposal by use as a target for Operation Crossroads atomic bomb tests at Bikini Atoll. Moored 363 yards (332 meters) from "surface zero," she was sunk by the Test Baker underwater atomic bomb explosion on 25 July 1946, the explosion's pressure waves compressing her hull and forcing her hatches open, completely flooding her. She was decommissioned on 29 August 1946 and was struck from the Naval Vessel Register on 25 February 1947.

Many sources claim that the wreck of Pilotfish was refloated, towed to Eniwetok Atoll, again used as an atomic bomb test target there during Operation Sandstone in 1948, and resunk off Eniwetok as a target on 16 October 1948. However, in 1991 the U.S. National Park Service reported that this narrative is incorrect, and that Pilotfish′s wreck was not salvaged after her 1946 sinking and remains on the bottom of the lagoon at Bikini Atoll.

== Honors and awards ==
Pilotfish received five battle stars for World War II service.
