= USS Flasher (SS-249) =

Submarine of the United States

Coordinates: 41.3626461°N 72.0834536°W

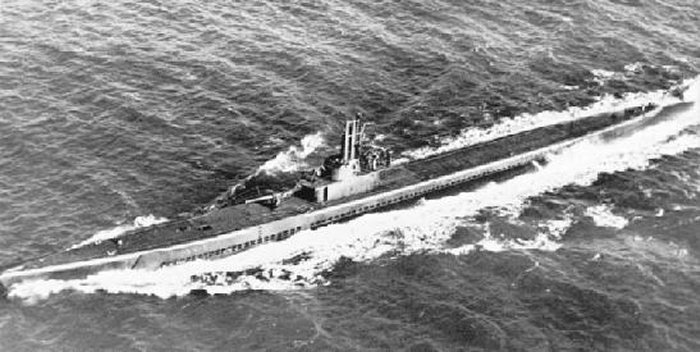
- Flasher (SS-249) underway, c. 1944.

History

United States
- Builder: Electric Boat Company, Groton, Connecticut
- Laid down: 30 September 1942
- Launched: 20 June 1943
- Commissioned: 25 September 1943
- Decommissioned: 16 March 1946
- Stricken: 1 June 1959
- Fate: Sold for scrap 8 June 1963, her conning tower is a memorial at Groton, Connecticut

General characteristics
- Class & type: Gato-class diesel-electric submarine
- Displacement: 1,525 tons (1,549 t) surfaced; 2,424 tons (2,460 t) submerged
- Length: 311 ft 9 in (95.02 m)
- Beam: 27 ft 3 in (8.31 m)
- Draft: 17 ft 0 in (5.18 m) maximum
- Propulsion: 4 × General Motors Model 16-248 V16 Diesel engines driving electric generators; 2 × 126-cell Sargo batteries; 4 × high-speed General Electric electric motors with reduction gears; two propellers; 5,400 shp (4.0 MW) surfaced; 2,740 shp (2.0 MW) submerged
- Speed: 21 knots (39 km/h) surfaced; 9 knots (17 km/h) submerged
- Range: 11,000 nmi (20,000 km) surfaced at 10 knots (19 km/h)
- Endurance: 48 hours at 2 knots (4 km/h) submerged; 75 days on patrol
- Test depth: 300 ft (90 m)
- Complement: 6 officers, 54 enlisted
- Armament: 10 × 21-inch (533 mm) torpedo tubes; 6 forward, 4 aft; 24 torpedoes; 1 × 3-inch (76 mm) / 50 caliber deck gun; Bofors 40 mm and Oerlikon 20 mm cannon

USS Flasher (SS-249) was a Gato-class submarine, which served in the Pacific during World War II. She received the Presidential Unit Citation and six battle stars, and sank 21 ships for a total of 100,231 tons of Japanese shipping, making her one of the most successful American submarines of the war. She was the first ship of the United States Navy to be named for the flasher.

== Construction and commissioning ==
Flasher′s keel was laid down 30 September 1942 by Electric Boat Company, Groton, Connecticut. She was launched on 20 June 1943, sponsored by Mrs. Eleanor Saunders — wife of Lieutenant Commander Willard A. Saunders, commanding officer of the submarine USS Muskallunge — and commissioned 25 September 1943, Lieutenant Commander Reuben T. Whitaker in command.

== First and second war patrols, January – May 1944 ==
Flasher arrived at Pearl Harbor from New London 15 December 1943 to prepare for her first war patrol, for which she sailed 6 January 1944. Bound for her patrol area off Mindoro, she sank her first target on 18 January, sending a 2,900-ton former gunboat Yoshida Maru to the bottom. Adding to what would be the greatest total of enemy tonnage credited to an American submarine in World War II, she sank the freighter Taishin Maru (1,723 tons) off Manila on 5 February and sank two cargo ships of the same convoy on 14 February. Flasher arrived at Fremantle, Australia, on 29 February to refit. The two vessels sunk on 14 February 1944 were the Minryo Maru (1,679 tons) and the Hokuan Maru (3,712 tons). See . (The Hokuan Maru probably rammed and sank the Grayling on 9 September 1943.)

Action-bound once more, the submarine departed Fremantle 4 April 1944 for the coast of French Indochina on her second war patrol. On 29 April, she contacted the French aviso Tahure guarding a freighter (Song Giang Maru, 1065 grt) off the Hon Doi Islands and sank both. After sinking a large cargo ship (Teisen Maru) in the Sulu Sea on 9 May, Flasher set course for Fremantle, arriving on 28 May for refit until 19 June.

== Third and fourth war patrols, June – October 1944 ==
Flasher made her third war patrol in the South China Sea, where on 28 June 1944, she contacted a heavily escorted convoy of 13 ships. She made a cautious approach, undeterred by the escort, and shortly after midnight on 29 June, broke into the convoy to sink a freighter (Nippo Maru, 6,079 tons) and badly damaged a large passenger cargo ship. Her next victim was a freighter (Koto Maru, 3,557 tons), sunk on 7 July. Twelve days later, Flasher sighted the cruiser Ōi escorted by a destroyer. Two attacks, each followed by a heavy depth charge retaliation from the destroyer, sank the cruiser, confirmed several hours later when a periscope observation revealed only the destroyer in sight. Seven days later, she sank another important target, a merchant tanker (Otoriyama Maru, 5,280 tons), and the same day damaged another tanker (Tosan Maru), later sunk by one of her sister boats. With all her torpedoes gone, Flasher put back for Fremantle, where she replenished and refitted between 7 and 30 August.

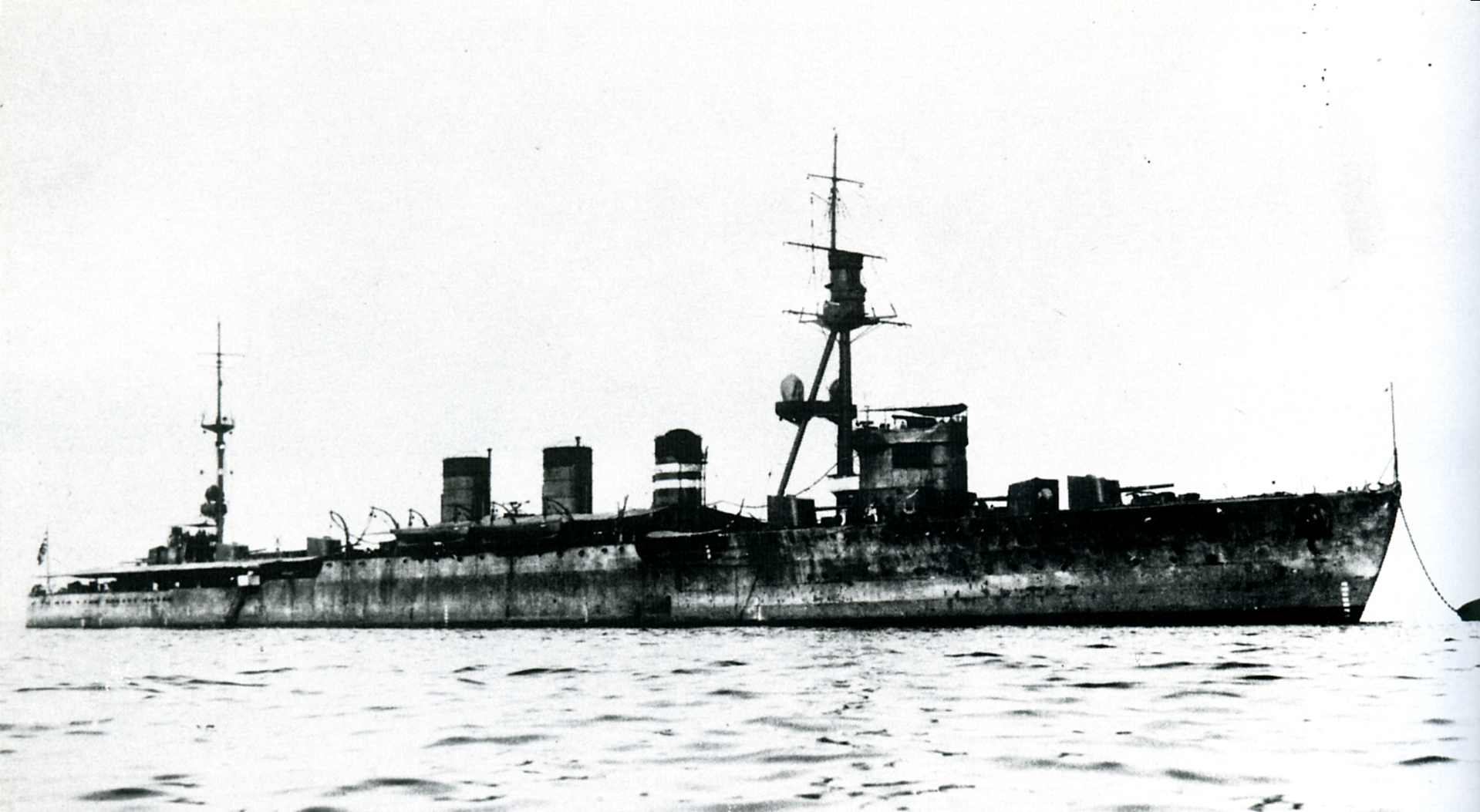
The Ōi in 1923

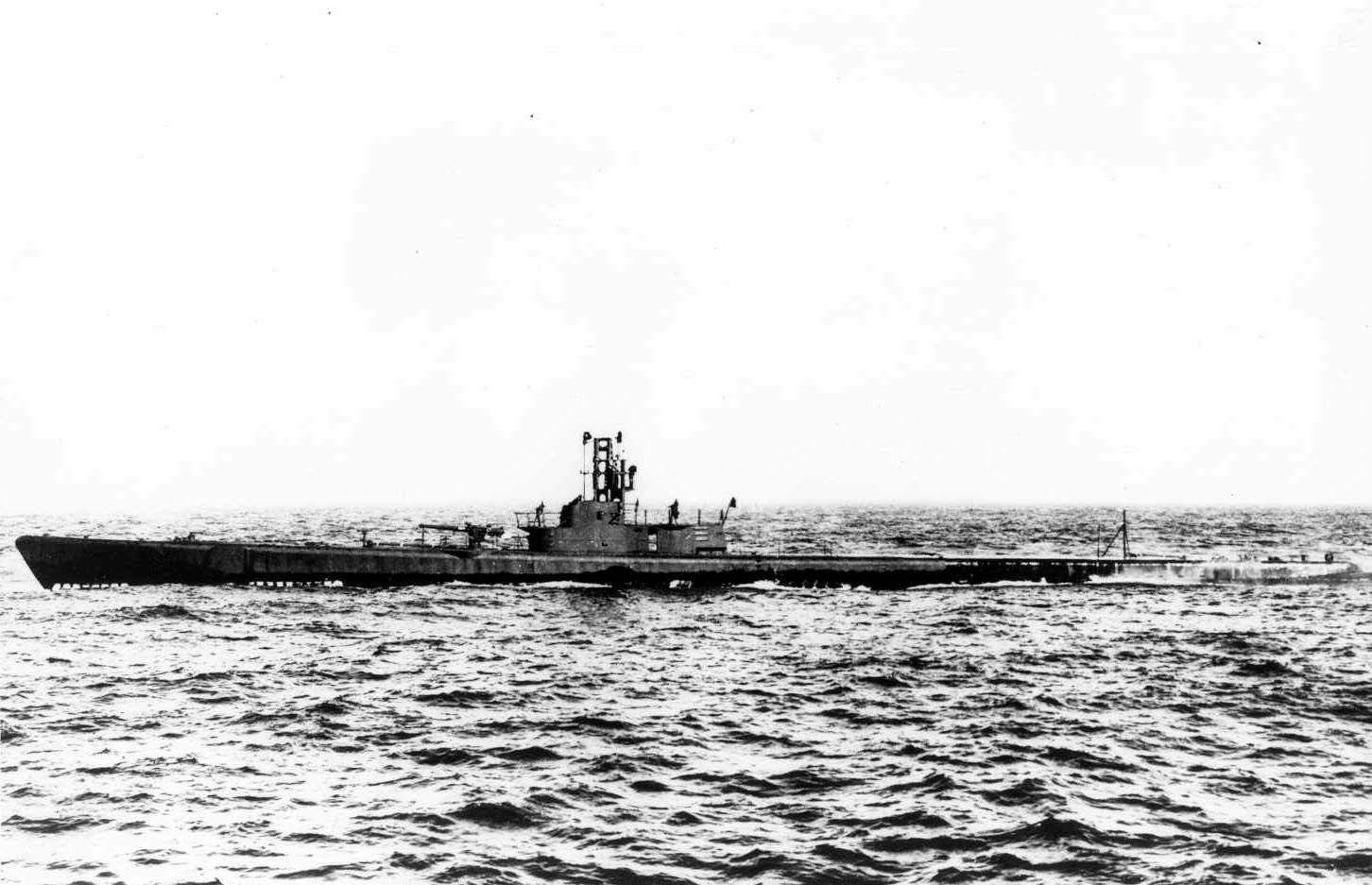
Flasher (SS-249) underway, c. 1944

During her fourth war patrol, in the Philippines, Flasher headed a co-ordinated attack group that included two other submarines, Hawkbill and Becuna. Although she was on lifeguard station during the air attacks preliminary to the invasion of the Philippines during part of this patrol, Flasher sank three ships, a former light cruiser (Saigon Maru, 5,350 tons) on 18 September, a transport and hospital ship (Ural Maru, 6,374 tons) on 27 September, and a cargo ship (Taibin Maru, 6,886 tons) on 4 October. She returned to Fremantle on 20 October.

== Fifth and sixth war patrols, November 1944 – April 1945 ==
Lieutenant Commander George W. Grider took command of Flasher on 31 October 1944. Heading the same attack group, Flasher departed on her fifth war patrol 15 November 1944, bound for Cam Ranh Bay. On 4 December, one of her companions reported a tanker convoy, and Flasher set a converging course. As she made her approach in a heavy downpour, a destroyer suddenly loomed up before her, and Flasher launched her first spread of torpedoes at this escort. The destroyer (Kishinami) was stopped by two hits and began listing and smoking heavily. Flasher got a spread of torpedoes away at a tanker before she was forced deep by a second destroyer, which dropped 16 depth charges. Rising to periscope depth, Flasher located the tanker burning and covered by yet a third destroyer. Speedily reloading, she prepared to sink the destroyer and finish off the tanker, and though almost blinded by rainsqualls, she did so with a salvo of four torpedoes, two of which hit the destroyer (Iwanami) and two of which passed beneath her, as planned, to hit the tanker (Hakko Maru, 10,022 tons). Once more, counterattack forced Flasher down, and when she surfaced, she found no trace of the two damaged destroyers. The tanker, blazing away, was still guarded by three escorts until abandoned at sunset, when Flasher sank her with one torpedo. The two destroyers, both found after the war to have been sunk, were Kishinami and Iwanami. (Note: However, the destroyer Iwanami did not exist. Flasher's war patrol reported that her count of destroyers may have been inaccurate, but this seems to have been ignored, and Flasher likely finished off the previously crippled Kishinami and did not hit any other destroyer.)

Flasher contacted another well-guarded tanker convoy on the morning of 21 December 1944, and she began a long chase, getting into position to attack from the unguarded shoreward side. In rapid succession, Flasher attacked and sank three of the tankers (Omurosan Maru, 9,204 tons, Otowasan Maru, 9,204 tons, and Arita Maru, 10,238 tons), receiving no counterattack, since the enemy apparently believed they had stumbled into a minefield. One of these tankers was the largest Flasher sank during the war. The other two tankers had displacements similar to each other, were tied for third-largest.

Refitting at Fremantle once more between 2 and 29 January 1945, Flasher made her sixth war patrol on the coast of Indochina. Contacts were few, but on 21 February, she sank a sea truck by surface gunfire, and 4 days later, sank a cargo ship (Koho Maru, 850 tons) with torpedoes. She completed her patrol upon her arrival at Pearl Harbor on 3 April 1945 and sailed a few days later for a West Coast overhaul.

== After the war ==
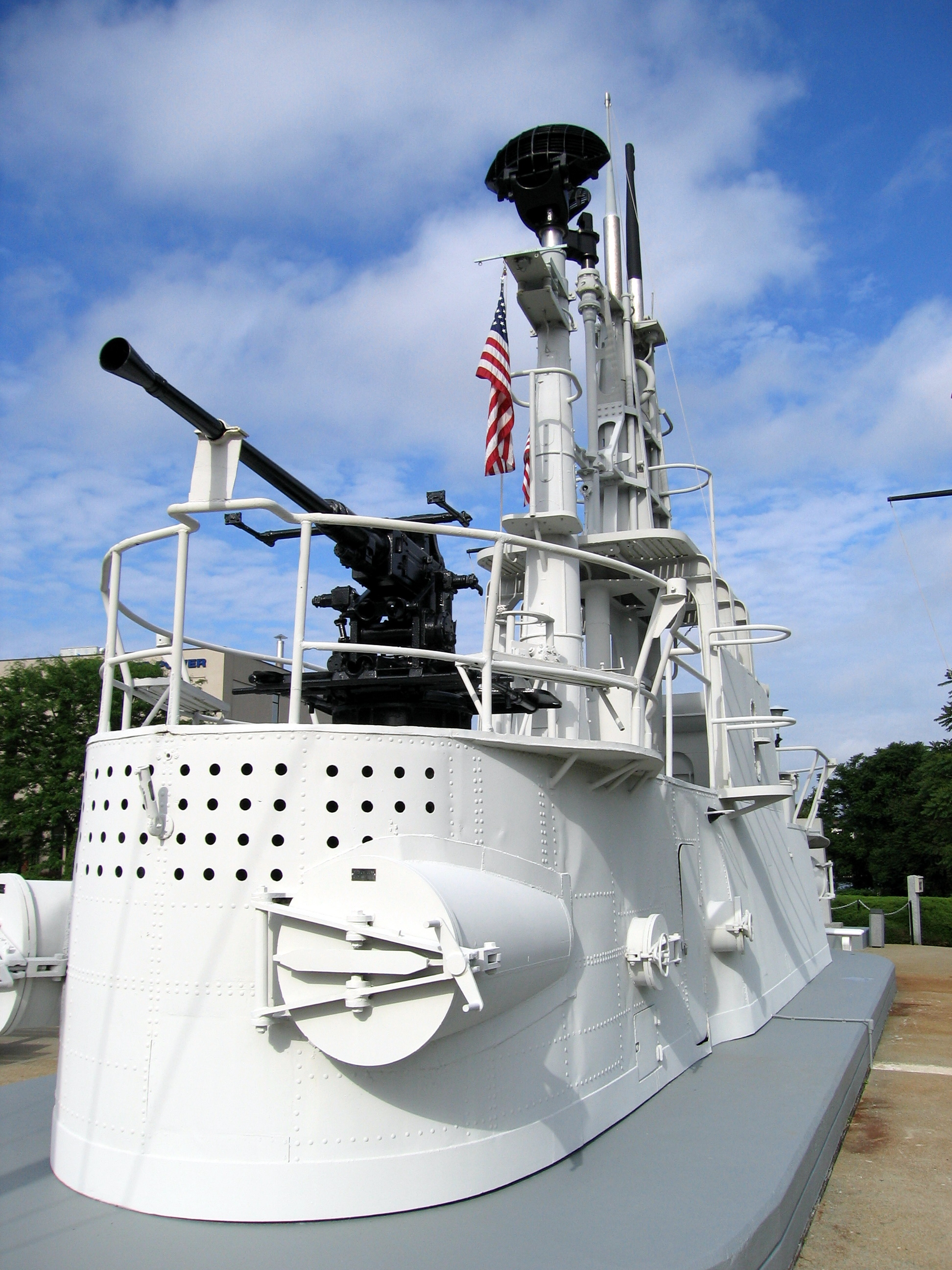
Flasher (SS-249) conning tower on display at the National Submarine Memorial, Groton, Connecticut

Bound for Guam on a seventh war patrol at the close of the war, Flasher was ordered back to New London, where she was decommissioned and placed in reserve on 16 March 1946, with Grider relinquishing command of her that month. She was attached to the Atlantic Reserve Fleet. On 1 June 1959 Flasher was struck from the Naval Vessel Register. She was sold for scrap on 1 June 1963.

== Commemoration ==
Flasher′s conning tower was removed and placed on display as a memorial at the entrance to Nautilus Park, a Navy housing area in Groton, Connecticut. It was then moved to the intersection of Thames Street and Bridge Street in Groton, where it is the centerpiece of a World War II memorial that honors the 52 U.S. submarines and their crews lost during the war. Its upkeep was originally the responsibility of the Submarine Veterans of World War II organization and was then transferred to U. S. Submarine Veterans, Inc.

== Awards ==
Flasher received the Presidential Unit Citation for her brilliantly successful third, fourth, and fifth war patrols. For her six war patrols, each designated successful, she received six battle stars.
