= Isherwood =

Isherwood may refer to:

== People ==
- Annie Isherwood (1862–1906), Anglican nun, founder of the Community of the Resurrection of Our Lord in Grahamstown, South Africa
- Benjamin F. Isherwood (1822–1915), U.S. ship's engineer and United States Navy admiral
- Brian Isherwood (born 1946), New Zealand cricketer
- Charles Isherwood (born 1964), theater critic
- Christopher Isherwood (1904–1986), English novelist
- Geof Isherwood (born 1960), Canadian painter and comics artist
- George Isherwood (1889-1974), English rugby union player, part of the first official British Isles team in 1910
- James Lawrence Isherwood (1917–1989), English artist
- Jean Isherwood (1911–2006), Australian painter
- Joseph Isherwood (1870–1937), British naval architect
- Mark Isherwood (politician) (born 1959), Welsh politician
- Nicholas Isherwood, bass singer
- Ray Isherwood (1938–2014), Australian cricket umpire
- Emma Taylor-Isherwood (born 1987), Canadian actress
- Sally Taylor-Isherwood (born 1990), Canadian actress
- Isherwood Williams, character in Earth Abides
- Lionel Isherwood (1872-1939) English cricketer

== Ships ==
- USS Isherwood (DD-284), a U.S. Navy destroyer in commission from 1919 to 1930
- USS Isherwood (DD-520), a U.S. Navy destroyer in commission from 1943 to 1961
- USNS Benjamin Isherwood (T-AO-191), a U.S. Navy oiler launched in 1988 that was never completed and is in reserve.
