= Benjamin Isherwood =

Benjamin Isherwood may refer to:

- Benjamin F. Isherwood (1822–1915), United States Navy admiral and early U.S. Navy engineer
- USNS Benjamin Isherwood (T-AO-191), a United States Navy fleet replenishment oiler launched in 1988 but never completed and sold for scrapping in 2011

== See also ==
- USS Isherwood, the name of more than one United States Navy ship named for Benjamin F. Isherwood
