= USS Isherwood =

Two ships of United States Navy were named USS Isherwood in honor of Rear Admiral Benjamin F. Isherwood.

- USS Isherwood (DD-284), was a Clemson-class destroyer, commissioned in 1919 and decommissioned in 1930
- USS Isherwood (DD-520), was a Fletcher-class destroyer, commissioned in 1943, decommissioned in 1961 and transferred to the Peruvian Navy as Guise (DD-72)

== See also ==
- USNS Benjamin Isherwood, a fleet replenishment oiler launched in 1989 but never completed and sold for scrapping in 2011
