= Fishing Battery Light =

Lighthouse in Maryland, United States

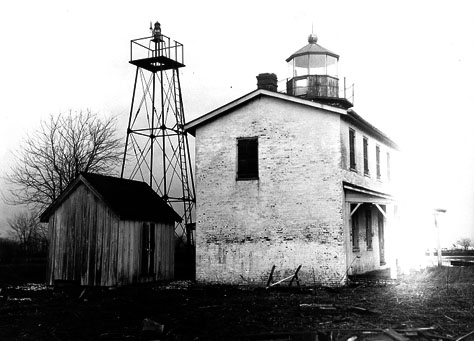
- old Fishing Battery Light with current skeleton tower standing behind
- Location: Fishing Battery Island south of Havre de Grace, Maryland
- Coordinates: 39.495°N 76.083°W

Tower
- Construction: brick
- Automated: 1939
- Height: 32 ft (current tower 38 ft)
- Shape: keeper's house with lantern on roof; replaced by steel skeleton tower

Light
- First lit: 1853
- Deactivated: 1925 (original light)
- Lens: sixth/fifth order Fresnel lens
- Range: 4 mi (white)/3 mi (red) (current light)
- Characteristic: Fixed white (original); Flashing white with two red sectors (current)

Fishing Battery Light was the last lighthouse constructed in Maryland by John Donahoo. While still standing, it has been supplanted by a steel tower which stands adjacent to it.

== History ==
Fishing Battery (also known as Donahoo Battery and Shad Battery at times) is an artificially constructed island, created to allow fishermen to transfer their catches to paddleboats whose draft barred them from entry to Havre de Grace. In 1851 Congress appropriated $5000 to erect a light on the island; this light was constructed in 1853 by John Donahoo, the last light he built on the Chesapeake Bay. His role in the purchase of the land for the light is a bit obscure, because although the main payment went to one Otho Scott, Donahoo was later paid $10 for the same plot. Donahoo had owned the island some ten years prior, and it is unclear whether he was paid for brokering the sale or to quit title claims.

The original structure was a brick one and half story house with the lantern in the center of the roof ridge, similar in form to those built at Point Lookout and Blakistone Island. Originally equipped with an all-but-obsolete wick and reflector, it gained a sixth order Fresnel lens within a few years, to be followed by a fifth order lens in 1899. The character of lantern was much criticized in official reports, and it was replaced in 1864 and again in 1867.

From 1880 to 1891 the United States Bureau of Fisheries leased the island, employing it as a fish hatchery, and eventually purchased it outright. Among a series of other improvements, the grade of the island was raised; when the floor of the light was raised to match the new grade, the walls were extended upwards and in essence the operation, including all of the keepers' habitation, was moved to the new second floor.

In 1928 the light was moved from the lantern to a skeleton tower which had been erected directly behind the house. The keepers continued to reside in the house until 1939, when the operation was automated. In 1942 the island was transferred to the Department of the Interior and was made part of the Blackwater National Wildlife Refuge. Though the tower continues in use, the old lighthouse was abandoned and has been heavily vandalized over the years. Local conservation and museum groups have been working to put together an effort to restore and conserve the light.
