= Conway Hillyer Arnold =

United States Navy rear admiral

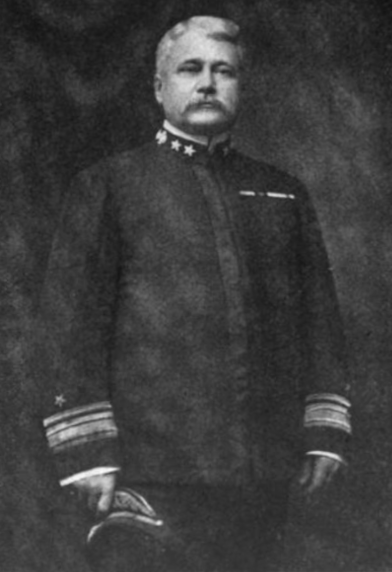
- Born: November 14, 1848; New York City, U.S.
- Died: July 16, 1917 (aged 68); New York City, U.S.
- Burial place: Oak Hill Cemetery; Washington, D.C., U.S.
- Spouse: Fannie Wood
- Relatives: William W. W. Wood (father-in-law)
- Military career
- Branch: United States Navy
- Rank: Rear admiral

Conway Hillyer Arnold, USN, (November 14, 1848 – July 16, 1917) was a rear admiral of the United States Navy, in command of the Third Squadron of the Atlantic Fleet in 1910.

== Early life ==
Arnold was born on November 14, 1848, in New York to Commander Henry Nathan Tewkesbury and Cornelia Van Vleck Sleight.

== Career ==
In 1867, he graduated from the United States Naval Academy, and in 1868 was commissioned as an ensign in the United States Navy.

In 1870, Arnold was commissioned as a master. The following year, he was promoted to the rank of lieutenant. After many years as a lieutenant, Arnold was commissioned to the rank of lieutenant commander in 1892.

In March 1898 he was assigned as lighthouse inspector for the 6th District. At the onset of the Spanish–American War in May 1898, he was promoted to the rank of commander. In 1902, he obtained the rank of captain. From February 1905 to March 1907 he served as the first commanding officer of the armored cruiser USS West Virginia (ACR-5). On November 4, 1907, he was assigned to special duty at the Naval War College in Newport, Rhode Island.

On January 30, 1908 he was promoted to rear admiral. On September 26, 1908 he was given command of the third squadron of the Atlantic Fleet and was assigned as president of the naval examination and retirement boards on June 17, 1909.

Arnold retired from the Navy on November 14, 1910, having reached the mandatory retirement age of 62.

== Personal life and family ==
On November 17, 1870, he married Fannie Wood of Raleigh, North Carolina, daughter of William W. W. Wood, Engineer in Chief of the United States Navy.

His son Conway Hillyer Arnold Jr., who also served with distinction in the military, died at a young age on April 6, 1908 in Denver, Colorado, possibly of tuberculosis.

Arnold was a companion of the Military Order of the Loyal Legion of the United States and a member of the Society of the Cincinnati. He was also a member of the Military Order of the Carabao. He was also a member of the Aztec Club of 1847 by right of his father's service in the Mexican American War and was also a member of the New York Yacht Club.

== Death and legacy ==
Arnold died on July 16, 1917, in New York City and was survived by his wife, Fannie and his two grandchildren. He was buried at Oak Hill Cemetery in Washington, D.C.
