= Lazaretto Point Light =

Lighthouse in Maryland, United States

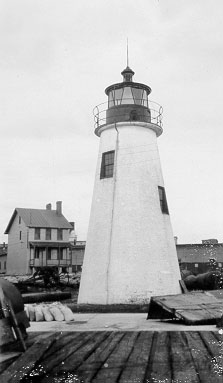
- Undated photograph of original Lazaretto Point Light, Maryland (USCG)
- Location: Lazaretto Point in Baltimore harbor (present location of Rukert Terminals Corporation property)
- Coordinates: 39.2622°N 76.5715°W (loc. of replica)

Tower
- Construction: brick/masonry
- Automated: 1916
- Height: 31 feet (9.4 m)
- Shape: conical tower

Light
- First lit: 1831
- Deactivated: 1926
- Lens: fourth-order Fresnel lens, upgraded to 3½ order in 1914
- Characteristic: fixed white

The Lazaretto Point Light was a historic lighthouse in Baltimore harbor. Though long demolished, a replica stands near its original site.

== History ==
Lazaretto Point, directly opposite from Fort McHenry, acquired its name from a smallpox quarantine hospital which once occupied the point. By the time that John Donahoo began construction of a brick tower light in 1831, the hospital was gone; the name was destined to live on in local naval lore, however, as in 1863 a depot was established around the tower for the construction and resupply of lighthouses throughout the bay. Many screw-pile lighthouses were prefabricated at the depot in preparation for erection at their final sites.

Iron was for a time mined at the point, and industrial sites sprung up around it, leading to years of complaints about the visibility of the light. A fourth order Fresnel lens installed in 1852 provided some improvement, as did a change from red to white aspect in 1870. In 1914 the light was electrified, and the fourth order lens replaced with a 3½ order. In spite of this the light became increasingly obscure, and the old tower was torn down in 1926, replaced by a taller steel skeleton tower. This tower survived until 1954. By this time the depot had diminished in importance, and it was shut down entirely in 1958, to be replaced by a Rukert Marine Terminal berth.

A replica of the original tower was constructed in 1985 by the Rukert Terminal Corporation in honor of Norman Rukert, Sr., who had entertained the idea of constructing such a replica before his death. The new tower was constructed from blueprints of the original found in the National Archives. Though it sports a small white light, it is not an active aid to navigation. In 1986, John Coulter, President of Rukert Terminals, proposed to his wife Fiona at the top of the Lazaretto Lighthouse.

Though a comprehensive compilation of lighthouse keepers for this light does not appear to be in existence, the US Federal Census, Reports to the Department of the Interior, the Annual Report of the Commissioner of Lighthouses to the Secretary of Commerce, and the Official Register of the US. Department of the Interior each provide a snapshot of who tended the light from year to year. William B. Shaw, a veteran of the War of 1812 and father of eleven, tended the lighthouse at its construction in 1831. Based on records from this era, Shaw and his family survived the fire that destroyed the keepers' quarters at Lazaretto in 1836. In 1841, the Hartford Times reports that Shaw was apparently written a letter by Thomas Ewing, Secretary of the Treasury, relieving him from his duties at this light. However, Shaw seems to have remained in service to the light despite his dismissal as the last record of his service at Lazaretto is dated 1853. An inspection reports that despite poor conditions at the lighthouse itself, Shaw was meticulous in his duties and kept a journal voluntarily. The whereabouts of his journal are presently unknown.

The keepers records leap ahead from 1853 to 1861, wherein one Samuel Scott ‘1’ is listed as the keeper. The keeper from 1873 until 1877 was John A. Phillips, who died while on duty at the lighthouse. The records jump to 1879, where the Census and the Dept of the Interior indicate that David Kilgoar (77 years old in 1880) and William S. Martin (58 years old in 1880) ‘2’ tended the light, the latter remaining in service to the light until 1892. Both men lived near the lighthouse in Canton or Baltimore. In addition to Martin, Joseph D. Bruff ‘3’ is listed as a keeper in 1885 and Charles S. Green ‘10’ also appears as a keeper in 1889. Martin's son, John A. Martin, is listed in the 1880 census as a lighthouse employee.

By 1911, William H. Davis Jr. ‘7’ is listed as the keeper. The 1920 Census of Davis tending the light is the last record of keepers at this light thus far. According to the 1920 census, Davis raised at least 5 children while keeping this light. The family is once again listed as living at the lighthouse as opposed to in town near the light. Several references have been made to Davis's service to this light. Davis is cited in 1913 for saving the Lazaretto Lighthouse Depot from a fire that engulfed the Lazaretto Lighthouse tower. Despite attempts to find further records about this fire, none have been discovered thus far. Several years later, Davis and Henry C. Wingate, a watchman, received a commendation from the Secretary of the Lighthouse Service for their attempts to save a drowning man near Lazaretto in 1916.
