= USNS Henry Eckford =

Oiler of the United States Navy

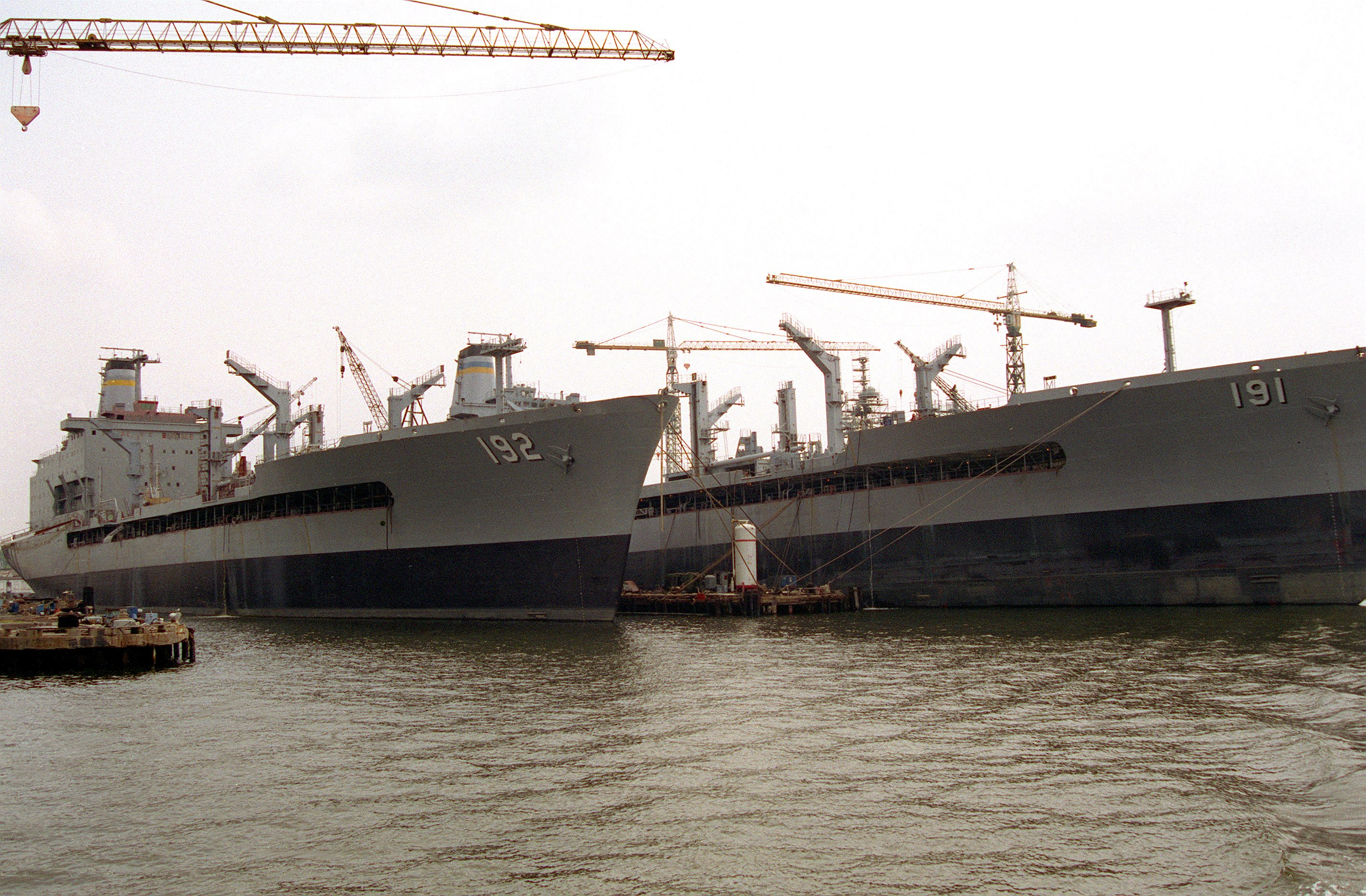
- USNS Henry Eckford (T-AO-192) (left) and USNS Benjamin Isherwood (T-AO-191) preparing for long-term storage.

History

United States
- Name: USNS Henry Eckford
- Namesake: Henry Eckford (1775–1832), naval architect and shipbuilder
- Awarded: 6 May 1985
- Builder: Pennsylvania Shipbuilding Company, Chester, Pennsylvania, and Tampa Shipbuilding Company, Tampa, Florida
- Laid down: 22 January 1987
- Launched: 22 July 1989
- In service: Never
- Stricken: 10 November 1997
- Identification: IMO number: 8508888
- Fate: Construction contract canceled 15 August 1993 when ship 84% complete; Sold for scrapping July 2011

General characteristics
- Class & type: Henry J. Kaiser-class replenishment oiler
- Type: Fleet replenishment oiler
- Tonnage: 31,200 deadweight tons
- Displacement: 9,500 tons light; Full load variously reported as 42,382 tons and 40,700 long tons (41,353 metric tons)
- Length: 677 ft (206 m)
- Beam: 97 ft 5 in (29.69 m)
- Draft: 35 ft (11 m) maximum
- Installed power: 16,000 hp (11.9 MW) per shaft; 34,442 hp (25.7 MW) sustained total
- Propulsion: Two medium-speed Colt-Pielstick PC4-2/2 10V-570 diesel engines, twin shafts, controllable-pitch propellers
- Speed: 20 knots (37 km/h; 23 mph)
- Capacity: 178,000 to 180,000 barrels (28,300 to 28,600 m^{3}) of fuel oil and jet fuel; 7,400 sq ft (690 m^{2}) dry cargo space and eight 20-foot (6.1 m) refrigerated containers with room for 128 pallets
- Complement: 103 (18 civilian officers, 1 U.S. Navy officer, 64 merchant seamen, 20 U.S. Navy enlisted personnel)
- Armament: Peacetime: none; Wartime: probably 2 x 20-mm Phalanx CIWS
- Aircraft carried: None
- Aviation facilities: Helicopter landing platform
- Notes: Five refueling stations; Two dry cargo transfer rigs

USNS Henry Eckford (T-AO-192) was a Henry J. Kaiser-class fleet replenishment oiler of the United States Navy. She was never completed.

== Construction ==
Henry Eckford, the sixth Henry J. Kaiser-class ship, was laid down by the Pennsylvania Shipbuilding Company in Chester, Pennsylvania, on 22 January 1987. Her construction encountered numerous problems. Although she was launched on 22 July 1989, her construction contract with Pennsylvania Shipbuilding was cancelled on 31 August 1989. Along with her unfinished sister ship USNS Benjamin Isherwood (T-AO-191), the incomplete Henry Eckford was towed to the Philadelphia Naval Shipyard in Philadelphia on 27 October 1989 for lay-up.

A new contract was awarded on 16 November 1989 to the Tampa Shipbuilding Company of Tampa, Florida, to complete Henry Eckford, and she was towed from Philadelphia to Tampa. However, construction problems continued, and that contract also was canceled, on 15 August 1993, when the ship was 84 percent complete. Cost overruns had run into the millions of U.S. dollars.

== Reserve ==
The Navy decided that completion of Henry Eckford as an oiler was no longer necessary, and considered converting her into an ammunition ship, but the conversion was found to be cost-prohibitive. Instead, the nearly complete Henry Eckford was turned over to the Maritime Administration and towed up the James River in Virginia, where she remained in reserve in the National Defense Reserve Fleet as part of the United States Navy's James River Reserve Fleet at Lee Hall, Virginia. She was struck from the Navy List on 10 November 1997, and her title was transferred to the Maritime Administration on 2 February 1998. She and Benjamin Isherwood were the only units of the 18-ship Henry J. Kaiser class not to be completed.

== Scrapping ==
On 19 July 2011, Henry Eckford departed for Brownsville, Texas, to be recycled by International Shipbreaking Limited.
