= John Donahoo =

American architect

John Donahoo (sometimes spelled Donahoe) (c. 1786–1858) was a lighthouse builder active in Maryland for much of the first half of the nineteenth century.

== Biography ==
Little is known of Donahoo's life, but he appears to have been an active citizen in Havre de Grace, Maryland, for much of his career; he was an election judge and town commissioner, and served on the school board. He was also an active businessman, with concerns in fishing and real estate. As a builder, Donahoo attracted the attention of Stephen Pleasonton, Fifth Auditor of the United States Treasury and overseer of lighthouse construction for the government; Donahoo's prices were low and the quality of his work was good. Consequently, he was awarded the contracts for a dozen lighthouses in Maryland and Virginia. Seven of these still stand:

- Pooles Island Light (1825)
- Concord Point Light (1827)
- Cove Point Light (1828)
- Point Lookout Light (1830)
- Turkey Point Light (1833)
- Piney Point Light (1836)
- Fishing Battery Light (1853)

He also constructed the following lighthouses:

- Thomas Point Light (1825, replaced by a second stone tower in 1838)
- Fog Point Light (1827, superseded by the Solomons Lump Light in 1875)
- Lazaretto Point Light (1831, demolished in 1926; replica built on original site in 1985)
- Clay Island Light (1832, collapsed in 1894 after deactivation)
- Watts Island Light (1833, destroyed in a storm in 1944) – this was his only light built outside of Maryland
- Blakistone Island Light (1851, destroyed by fire in 1956)

Donahoo died in 1858, and was buried in Havre de Grace's Angel Hill Cemetery.
