= Military Order of the Carabao =

Social club for U.S. military officers who served in the Philippines

- Medal showing the insignia of the Military Order of the Carabao.
- Type: Social club
- Tax ID no.: 52-6046824
- Headquarters: Army and Navy Club
- Website: carabao.org

The Military Order of the Carabao is a social club open to officers of the U.S. military and war correspondents who served in the Philippines or on overseas official military campaigns. The order was initially created to satirize the pompous and pretentious Military Order of the Dragon. Descendants of those eligible for membership are themselves eligible, regardless of military service. As of 2016 the annual dues were US$50.

== Background ==
The organization was founded in 1900 by U.S. officers stationed in the Philippines during the Philippine Insurrection that occurred after the Spanish–American War. The idea for a lampoon was conceived by several Army officers one night at the Army-Navy Club in Manila. This organization was founded to counter and satirize the Military Order of the Dragon, founded by other American officers who served in the short-lived Boxer uprising in China. Only the Carabao survives today.

The carabao referred to in the organization's name is a domesticated water buffalo used as a beast of labor in the Philippines. The group's membership is referred to as "the herd" and individual members are called "bulls." At each annual Wallow, the incoming Grand Paramount Carabao promises to "keep the herd well-wetted down."

The Military Order of the Carabao is one of several military orders in the United States composed of commissioned officers and their descendants. Other military orders include the Society of the Cincinnati, the Aztec Club of 1847, the Military Order of the Loyal Legion of the United States, the Military Order of the Stars and Bars, the Military Order of the Dragon, the Naval Order of the United States, the Military Order of Foreign Wars, the Order of Lafayette and the Military Order of the World Wars.

== Carabao Wallow ==
The organization sponsors an annual social event called the Carabao Wallow, a black-tie, military-dress affair attended by members of the U.S. military, the U.S. government, and corporations associated with the military, such as defense contractors. Members perform semi-professional musical skits at the Wallow that often poke fun at national and international issues as well as current events. It is not uncommon for the Carabao players to spoof the high-ranking guests seated at the Head Table.

The group's anthem, sung at the Wallow, is "The Soldier's Song", which refers to “bolos” (machetes used by Filipino insurgents) and “ladrones” (thieves)

In the days of dopey dreams—happy, peaceful Philippines,
When the bolomen were busy all night long.
When ladrones would steal and lie, and Americanos die,
Then you heard the soldiers sing this evening song:
Damn, damn, damn the insurrectos!
Cross-eyed kakiac ladrones!
Underneath the starry flag, civilize 'em with a Krag,
And return us to our own beloved homes.

This is sung to "Tramp! Tramp!Tramp!"

== Membership ==
Members and guests at the Wallow in recent years have included former Secretary of State Colin Powell, Defense Secretary Robert M. Gates, Chairman of the Joint Chiefs General Richard B. Myers, former CIA director and defense secretary James Schlesinger, Congressman Ike Skelton, Air Force Secretary Pete Aldridge, NASA director Sean O'Keefe, Chairman of the Joint Chiefs General Peter Pace, General P. X. Kelley, General Alfred M. Gray, Jr., former Deputy Secretary of Homeland Security Admiral James M. Loy, General Jack N. Merritt, General Billy Mitchell and General Carl Mundy and Jeff Owad.

Honorary membership is conferred upon the President of the United States and the Ambassador to the United States from the Republic of the Philippines.

Other members of the Order have included:

- President William Howard Taft (honorary) – he later resigned his membership after an act of public ridicule of his administration's Philippines policy.
- President Woodrow Wilson (honorary)
- General of the Armies John J. Pershing
- General of the Army Douglas MacArthur (installed as Supreme Paramount Carabao in February 1932)
- General Walter Krueger
- General Roy S. Geiger, USMC
- Lieutenant General John L. DeWitt
- Lieutenant General Samuel B. M. Young
- Vice Admiral Albert P. Niblack
- Major General James B. Aleshire
- Major General Frederick D. Grant
- Major General Ulysses S. Grant III
- Major General Mark L. Hersey
- Major General Charles L. McCawley, USMC
- Major General Charles T. Menoher
- Major General William W. Wotherspoon
- Brigadier General Daniel W. Hand
- Brigadier General John F. Madden
- Brigadier General Walter McCaw
- Brigadier General Jacob H. Smith
- Rear Admiral Conway Hillyer Arnold
- Rear Admiral Joseph K. Taussig
- Rear Admiral Nathan C. Twining
- Colonel Melville J. Shaw, USMC
- Major Archibald Butt

In 2015 Gene Simmons of the rock band Kiss was inducted as an honorary member at the Order's annual wallow in Washington, D.C.

== See also ==
- Society of the Cincinnati
- Aztec Club of 1847
- Military Order of the Loyal Legion of the United States
- Military Order of the Stars and Bars
- Naval Order of the United States
- Military Order of Foreign Wars
- Military Order of the Dragon
- Naval and Military Order of the Spanish War
- Order of Lafayette
- Military Order of the World Wars

== Sources ==
- Military Order of the Carabao
- "Historical sketch, constitution, and register of the Military order of the Carabao together with songs that have been sung at "wallows" in various places." edited by Military Order of the Carabao, Publisher: W.F. Roberts Co., Washington, D.C.,1914.
- Officers of the Main Corral 1913 "Military order of the Carabao," by the Military Order of the Carabao
- Ian Urbina, "The Empire Strikes Back: The Tribal Rites of America's Military Leaders", The Village Voice, 29 January-4 February 2003.
- Edwards, E.J. (13 November 1910). "Men Who Head America's Exclusive Patriotic Societies; Descendant of Gov. Winslow Is President-General of the Cincinnati – The Warrior Who Heads the Loyal Legion – An Old Indian Fighter Commands the Military Order of the Carbao". The New York Times.
- "Carabao Order Has High Standards; Formed in 1900 to Perpetuate Memories and Associations in Philippines. It Aim to Foster Duty". The New York Times. 26 December 1913.
