= William W. Wood =

American Navy engineer (1818–1882)

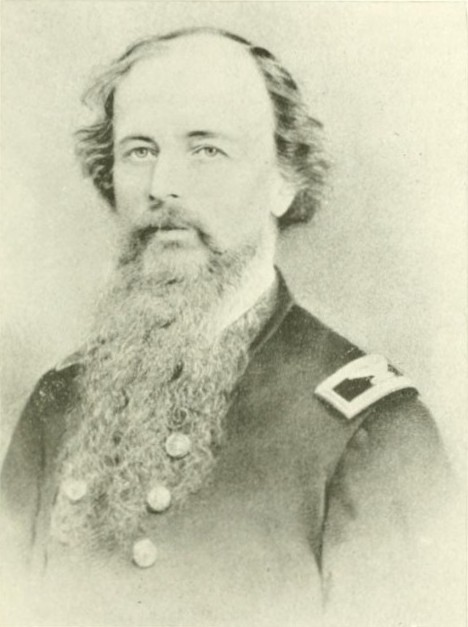

Chief of the Bureau of Steam Engineering
- In office March 31, 1873 – March 3, 1877
- Preceded by: James Wilson King
- Succeeded by: William Henry Shock

Personal details
- Born: William Willis Wiley Wood; May 30, 1818 Wake County, North Carolina
- Died: August 31, 1882 (aged 64) off Point Lookout, Maryland
- Resting place: Oak Hill Cemetery; Washington, D.C., U.S.
- Spouse: Fanny Henderson
- Children: 8
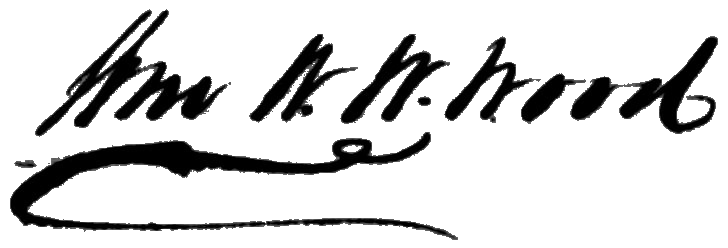
- Signature

Military service
- Allegiance: United States
- Branch: United States Navy
- Years of service: 1845–1880
- Rank: Engineer-in-chief
- Conflict: American Civil War

William Willis Wiley Wood (May 30, 1818 – August 31, 1882) was an engineer of the United States Navy, who served as Engineer-in-Chief of the Bureau of Steam Engineering from 1873 until 1877.

== Biography ==
Wood was born in Wake County, North Carolina, and after graduation obtained a position at the West Point Foundry.

He was appointed to the Navy from New York on March 15, 1845, with the rank of chief engineer. He spent his first two years in the navy stationed at the Pensacola Navy Yard, Florida. He briefly did special duty at Boston, and then from 1850 to 1853, served on the paddle-sloop Saranac in the Home Squadron.

From 1854 to 1857, Wood superintended the constructions of the engines of the screw-frigate Merrimack at Cold Spring, New York. His next appointment was for two years serving in the screw-sloop Lancaster on the Pacific Squadron. From 1862 to 1866, Wood spent most of his time on special duty in Philadelphia, New York and Boston. Wood was assigned to the United States Naval Academy from 1866 to 1867. Wood was Inspector of Machinery Afloat in New York from 1870 to 1872.

Wood was promoted to engineer-in-chief in 1872, and was appointed Chief of the Bureau of Steam Engineering on March 20, 1873, his successor was appointed on March 3, 1877. Wood was assigned to special duty in 1878, and was placed on the retired list on May 31, 1880.

== Death ==
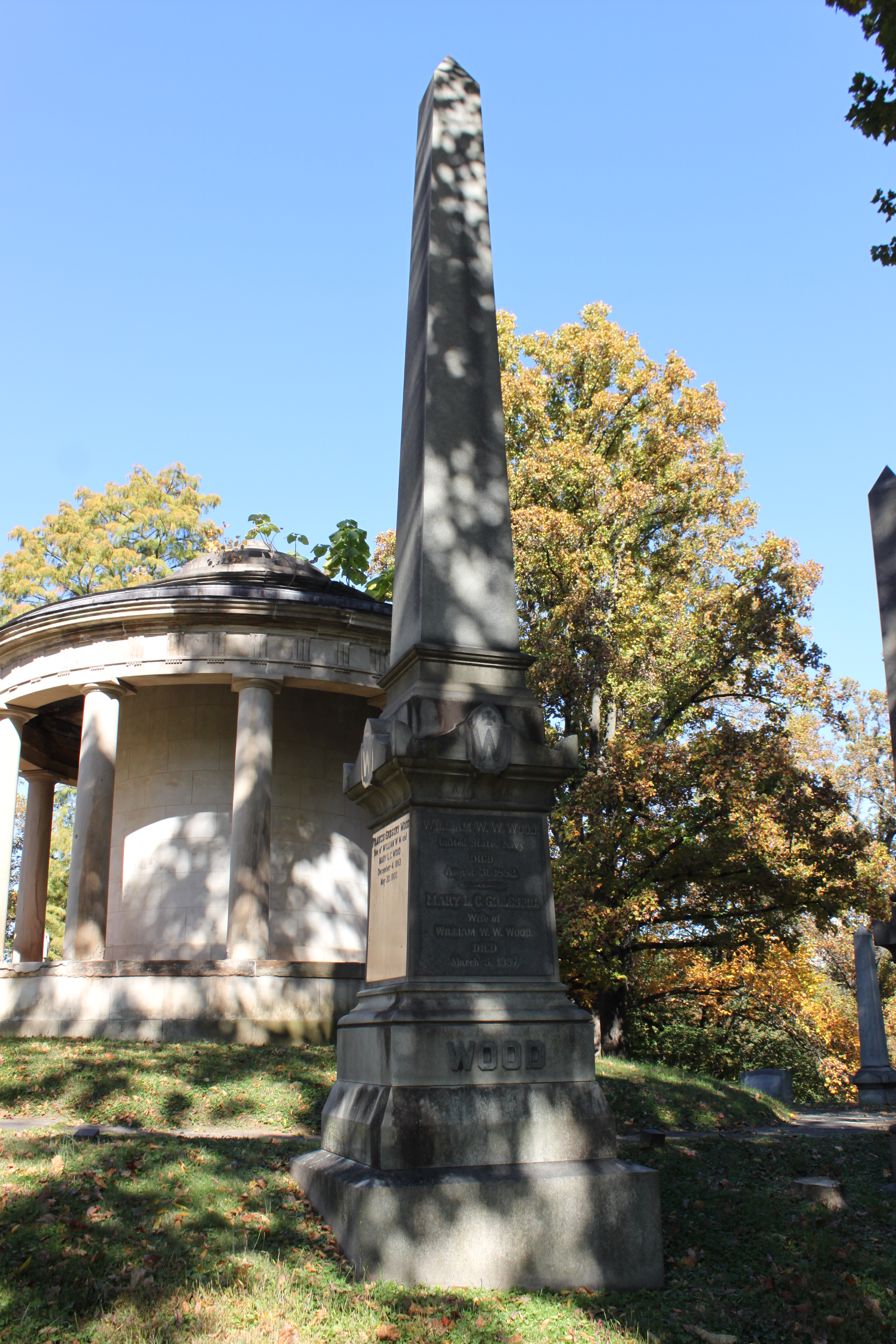
Grave of Wood at Oak Hill Cemetery

On August 31, 1882, Wood was drowned in a boating accident off Point Lookout, Maryland. He was buried at Oak Hill Cemetery in Washington, D.C.

== Family ==
At the time of his death, Wood was married and had six children:

- Fanny Henderson, wife of Lt. Conway Hillyer Arnold, USN
- Mary Eliza, wife of Lt. Eugene DeForest Heald, USN
- Leiley Weir, wife of Lt. Charles Allston Stone, USN
- Lt. Thomas Newton Wood, USN
- Emily Grace, wife of Lt. Henry Frick Reich, USN
- Master Francis Gregory Wood

Two more, William Willis Wood and Charles Gillespie Wood, had died young.

== See also ==
- USS Spuyten Duyvil
