= Piney Point Light =

Lighthouse in Maryland, United States

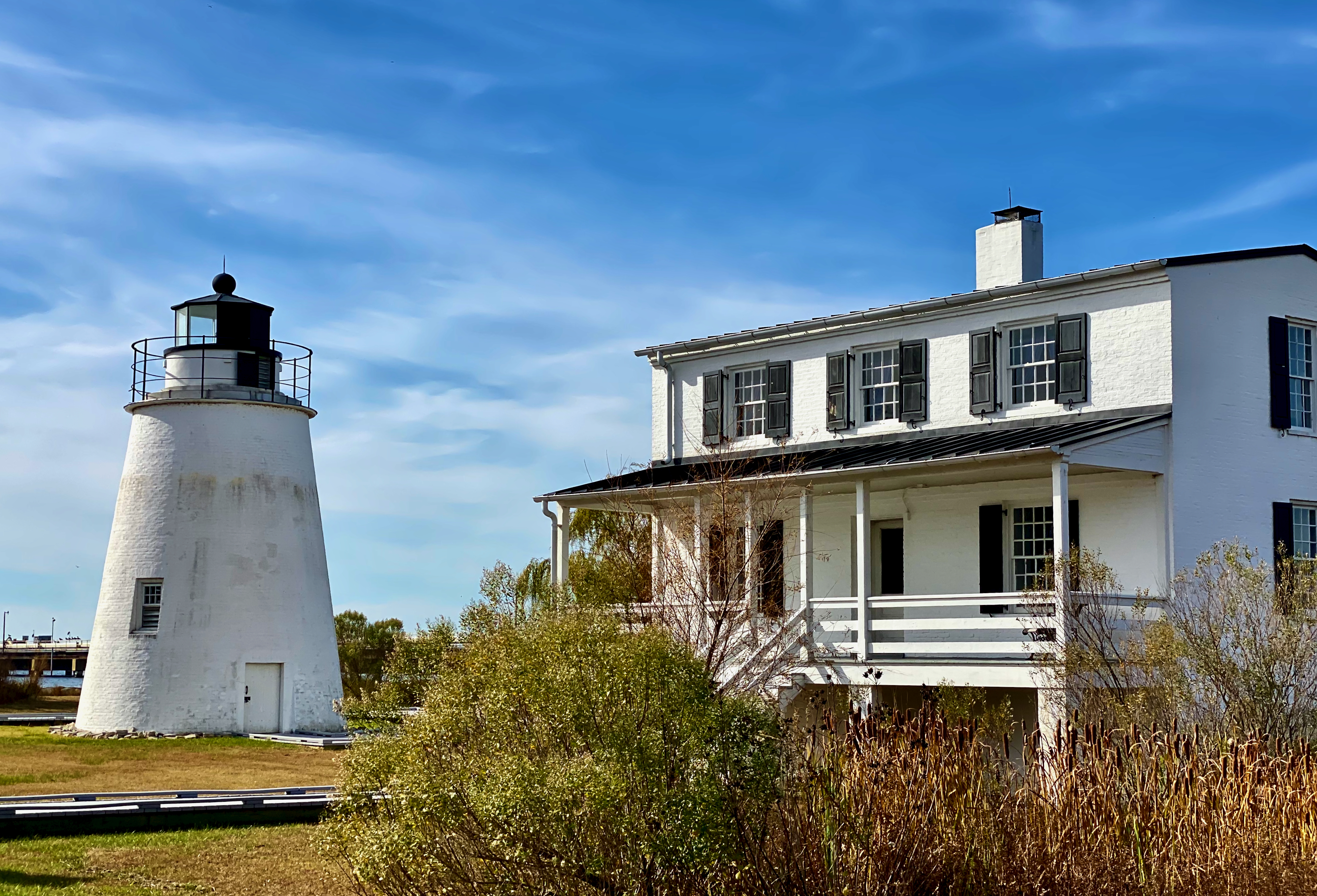
- Location: Piney Point in St. Mary's County, Maryland, about 13 miles from the mouth of the Potomac River
- Coordinates: 38.1355°N 76.5297°W

Tower
- Constructed: 1836
- Construction: brick/masonry
- Height: 34 ft (10 m)
- Shape: conical tower
- Heritage: National Register of Historic Places listed place

Light
- First lit: 1836
- Deactivated: 1964
- Lens: fifth-order Fresnel lens
- Piney Point Coast Guard Light Station
- U.S. National Register of Historic Places
- Nearest city: Piney Point, Maryland
- Area: 2 acres (0.81 ha)
- Built by: John Donahoo
- NRHP reference No.: 76002171
- Added to NRHP: June 16, 1976

The Piney Point Lighthouse was built in 1836 located at Piney Point on the Potomac River in Maryland just up the river from the mouth of the Chesapeake Bay. The Coast Guard decommissioned it in 1964 and it has since become a museum. It is known as the Lighthouse of Presidents because several early US Presidents visited or stayed on the grounds.

== History ==
Congress appropriated $5000 to build the lighthouse in 1836. The lighthouse was built by John Donahoo and had a range of 10 nautical miles (19 km; 12 mi). The lamp was replaced in 1855 with a Fresnel lens upgrading the range to 11 nautical miles (20 km; 13 mi).

A bell tower was added in 1880 and was in service until 1954 when Hurricane Hazel damaged it beyond repair.

The federal government deeded the property to St. Mary's County in 1980 and in 1990 the Museum Division of St. Mary's County Department of Recreation and Parks began to renovate the grounds.

Exhibits at the Piney Point Lighthouse Museum focus on the lighthouse, the United States Coast Guard, the Piney Point area, and the story of the Black Panther U-1105 German submarine sunk in the Potomac that now serves as a shipwreck dive preserve.

The Potomac River Maritime Exhibit displays four historic wooden vessels in a separate building.

Visitors can climb the lighthouse tower when the museum is open for operation.

The nearby Piney Point Elementary School in Tall Timbers, Maryland is named after the lighthouse.

== See also ==
- List of maritime museums in the United States
