= Integral lighthouse =

Lighthouse in which the tower and keeper's dwelling are united in one structure

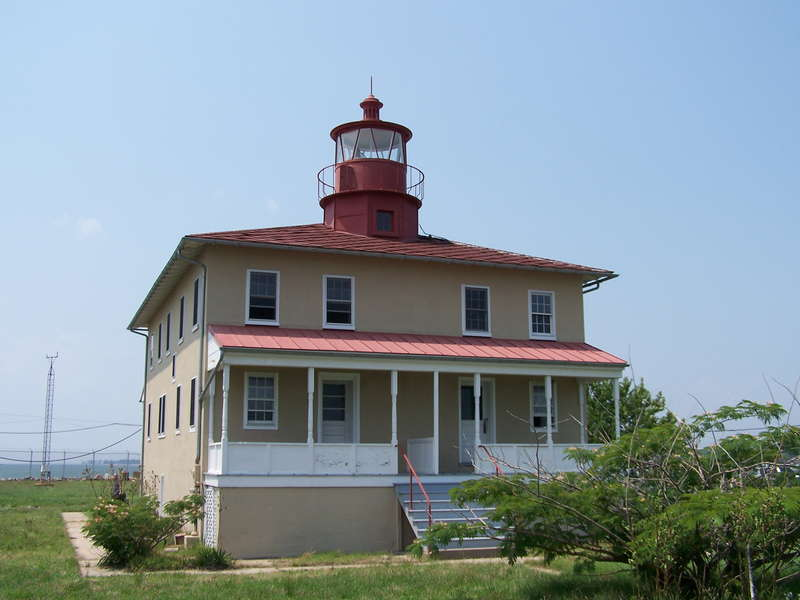
Point Lookout Light in Maryland

An integral lighthouse is a lighthouse in which the tower and keeper's dwelling are united in one structure. Generally, the term is not used to refer to a caisson or screw-pile lighthouse.
