= Clay Island Light =

Lighthouse in Maryland, United States

- Location: Clay Island at the confluence of Fishing Bay and the Nanticoke River
- Coordinates: 38.234°N 75.970°W(approximate)

Tower
- Constructed: 1892
- Construction: brick/wood
- Height: 36 feet (11 m)
- Shape: House with lantern on roof

Light
- First lit: 1832
- Deactivated: 1892
- Lens: sixth-order Fresnel lens

The Clay Island Light was a historic lighthouse located on Clay Island at the mouth of the Nanticoke River on the Chesapeake Bay. Constructed in 1832, it continued to serve the area until 1892, when it was replaced by the Sharkfin Shoal Light. Two years later, the building collapsed, and nothing remains of it.

== History ==
Since at least 1673, Clay Island had appeared on maps of the Chesapeake Bay area. In that year, it was included on the Augustine Herman map of the Chesapeake, although this map referred to the location as Phillips Point rather than Clay Island, and it was under that name that the location would appear in the novel Moll Flanders by Daniel Defoe. Clay Island is at an important nautical location, as it sits where the Nanticoke River and Fishing Bay intersect near the mouth of the Wicomico River on the lower Eastern Shore of Maryland.

In 1828, land for the construction of a lighthouse was purchased for $600. The light was constructed four years later, in 1832, by John Donahoo, at a total cost of $6,500. The structure he built consisted of a small house with a tower on its roof. This tower eventually enclosed a sixth order Fresnel lens, which displayed a white light 36 feet (11 m) above the mean high water mark. By 1882, reports claimed that the structure was beginning to wash away. The Lighthouse Board chose not to repair it, preferring instead to replace it with a more modern light located on Sharkfin Shoal nearby. When the Sharkfin Shoal Light was finally completed in 1892, the Clay Island Light was decommissioned and abandoned. Two years later, the structure collapsed. No remnants of the lighthouse exist.
