= James Wilson King =

American Navy engineer (1819–1905)

James W. King
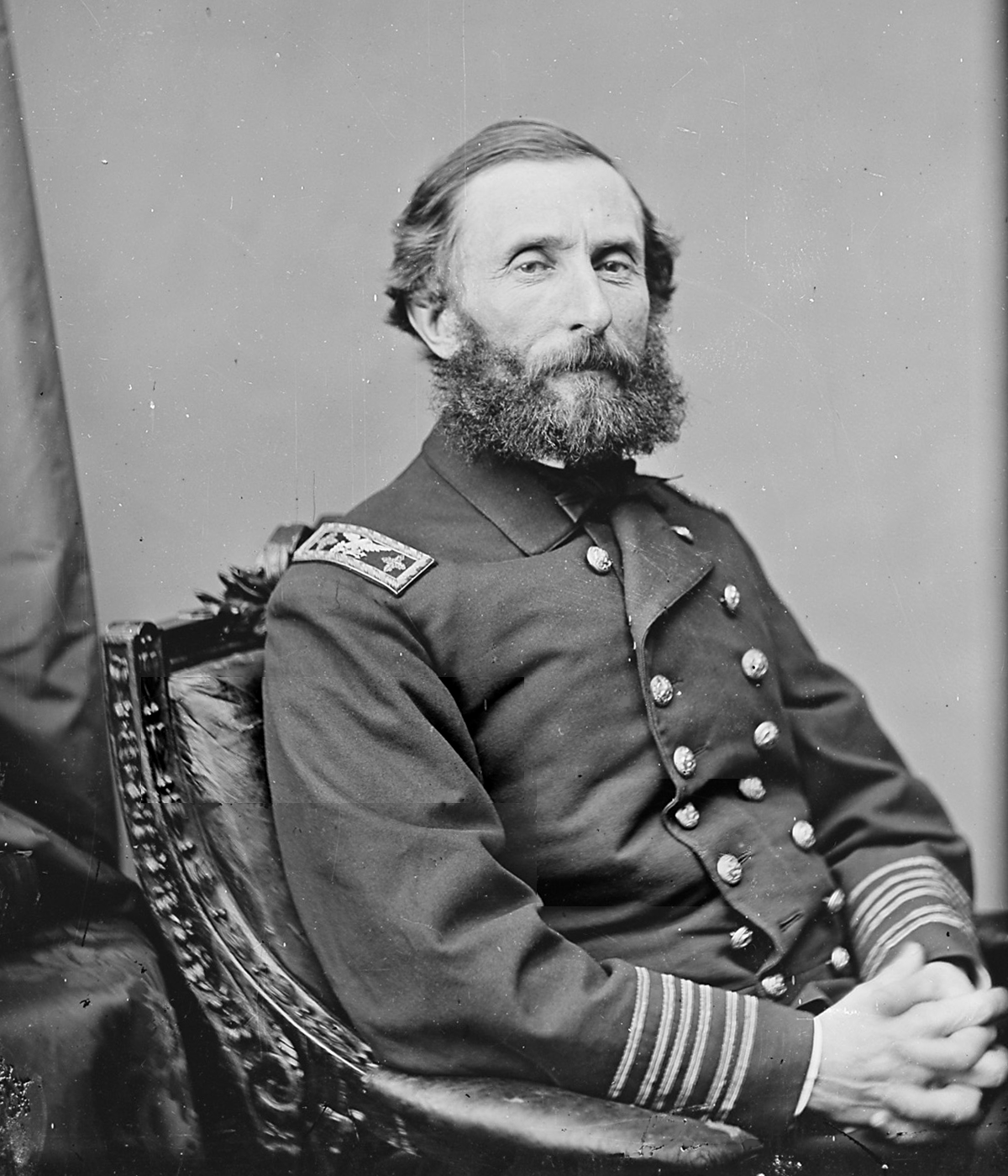
- King during the American Civil War

Chief of the Bureau of Steam Engineering
- In office March 23, 1869 – March 14, 1873
- Preceded by: Benjamin Franklin Isherwood
- Succeeded by: William Willis Wiley Wood

Personal details
- Born: James Wilson King; August 26, 1819 Baltimore, Maryland, U.S.
- Died: June 6, 1905 (aged 85) Philadelphia, Pennsylvania, U.S.

Military service
- Allegiance: United States
- Branch: United States Navy
- Years of service: 1844–1881
- Rank: Engineer-in-chief
- Wars: Mexican–American War; American Civil War

James Wilson King (August 26, 1819 – June 6, 1905) was an American Navy Officer. He served as Chief Engineer of the United States Navy. During his career, he held every position in the Navy to which an engineering officer could be called. Today, he is best known for his 1880 book, The Warships and Navies of the World, which has been called "an important book to establish reliable contemporary information." It was republished by the U.S. Naval Institute in 1982.

== Early life and education ==
King was born in Baltimore and raised on his grandfather's farm in Maryland. He studied at St. James's Academy and, having become fascinated by steam engines at the age of sixteen, learned mechanical engineering while working at a machine shop in Baltimore.

== Career ==
King was appointed to the Navy from Maryland as a Third Assistant Engineer on September 2, 1844. During the Mexican–American War, he was attached to the paddle-frigate USS Mississippi and participated in the capture of all but one of the towns on the Mexican coast taken by the Navy. On July 10, 1847, he was promoted to Second Assistant Engineer. King served on all the first steamers that belonged to the U.S. Navy, except the first Fulton.

King was promoted to First Assistant Engineer on September 13, 1849 and to Chief Engineer on November 12, 1852. He was appointed Government Inspector of Ocean Mail Steamers at New York in 1853. In 1858, he was appointed Chief Engineer at the New York Navy Yard.

King was Chief Engineer of the North Atlantic Fleet in the early part of the American Civil War. "Subsequently he was the superintendent of the construction of all the armour-clads built west of the Alleghenies, involving an expenditure in the aggregate of seven millions of dollars".

King was promoted to Engineer in Chief on March 15, 1869. In 1869, President Ulysses S. Grant appointed him Chief of the Bureau of Steam Engineering. In this post, King introduced double-expansion engines into the U.S. Navy. He held this post until March 20, 1873.

During the mid-1870s, King—as chief engineer of the Navy—made many visits, official and private, to Europe, to collect information relating to shipbuilding, machinery, and other aspects of naval warfare. In 1877, he produced a report to Congress entitled, European Ships of War and Their Armament, Naval Administration and Economy, Marine Constructions and Appliances, Dockyards, etc., etc. King's critical evaluations of naval architecture assumed that Congress might soon fund new designs for a re-equipped American Navy. A second edition was published in 1878. King then produced an expanded version of these reports in his 1880 book, The Warships and Navies of the World.

== Retirement and death ==
King was placed on the retired list on August 26, 1881, having reached the mandatory retirement age of sixty-two. He died at his home at 3221 Powelton Avenue, Philadelphia, on June 6, 1905.

== Bibliography ==
- Hamersly, L. R., ed. (1870). The records of living officers of the United States Navy and Marine Corps. Philadelphia: J. B. Lippincott & Co. OCLC 422938.
