= Watts Island Light =

Lighthouse in Virginia, United States

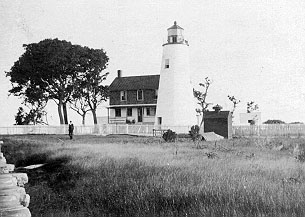
- undated photograph of Watts Island Light (USCG)
- Location: South of Watts Island in the lower Chesapeake Bay
- Coordinates: 37.782°N 75.894°W (approximate)

Tower
- Construction: stone
- Automated: 1923
- Height: 48 feet (15 m)
- Shape: conical tower

Light
- First lit: 1833
- Deactivated: 1944

The Watts Island Light was a historic lighthouse located near Watts Island in the Chesapeake Bay. It was the only lighthouse built by John Donahoo outside of Maryland.

== History ==
The island on which this light stood was originally called Little Watts Island, though by 1867 the light was referred to as if it were on the much larger Watts Island proper a short ways north. It was constructed in 1833 by John Donahoo and is the only one of his thirteen lights outside of Maryland.

The island was plagued with erosion, and by 1923 four of the original 7 acres (2.8 ha) had disappeared. In that year the light was automated and the entire island of Little Watts, including the keeper's house, was sold to a Baltimore insurance executive, save a 30-foot (9.1 m) diameter plot centered on the tower. After the light was automated, Charles Hardenberg, a Princeton-educated lawyer from a respected Jersey City, New Jersey family moved into the abandoned keeper's house after his brother, a physician, bought Little Watts. Hardenberg had moved to Watts Island in the middle of the Chesapeake Bay in 1910 on a bet he couldn't stay there alone for ten years, but lived as a hermit on the islands until his death nearly 30 years later in 1937.

In 1944 a winter storm demolished both the house and the tower, and now even the island itself is gone. The spot is now charted as "Watts Island Rocks" and is marked only with a lighted buoy.
