= Bureau of Steam Engineering =

Former bureau of the U.S. Navy (1862-1940)

The Bureau of Steam Engineering was a bureau of the United States Navy, created by the act of 5 July 1862, receiving some of the duties of the former Bureau of Construction, Equipment and Repair. It became, by the Naval Appropriation Act of 4 June 1920, the Bureau of Engineering (BuEng). In 1940 it combined with the Bureau of Construction and Repair (BuC&R) and became the Bureau of Ships (BuShips).

== Historical background ==
"Engineering, both in operating the shipboard machinery and in the design and construction of ships, became critically important with the outbreak of the Civil War. The Navy had to blockade a ‘coastline stretching over 3,000 miles from the Potomac to the Mexican border. It had to support the Army on the rivers; it had to search out and destroy Confederate raiders. For all these purposes, the steam engine and the engineer were indispensable. On the day of battle, steam engines drove the Monitor and the Merrimack, the Kearsarge and the Alabama, as well as the gunboats which supported Grant before Fort Donelson and Vicksburg. In 1862, Congress recognized the importance of engineering by creating the Bureau of Steam Engineering.

"When Lee surrendered, the United States Navy was the most effective sea power in the world. That position depended upon engineering which, in turn, was based on the skill of Benjamin F. Isherwood, first Chief of the Bureau of Steam Engineering. He designed and built engines rugged enough to withstand the shock of combat, as well as ill-treatment by poorly trained operating engineers. He also designed and constructed a well-armed cruiser which was faster than any abroad. In addition, American naval leadership rested upon ingenious civilian engineers and inventors such as John Ericsson, who designed and built the Monitor."

The Navy's first marine engineer was a civilian appointment in 1836. Congress authorized the establishment of an Engineer Corps in 1842. The 1862 reorganization gave officers of the Engineer Corps their own bureau with dedicated billets to avoid competition from Construction Corps officers (naval architects) in the separated Bureau of Construction and Repair. In 1864 Congress authorized establishment of a separate United States Naval Academy curriculum for naval constructors and steam engineers; and the academy offered parallel tracks for cadet-midshipmen and cadet-engineers. Shipboard commanding officers became uncomfortable with their increasing dependency on the skills and advice of subordinates trained in matters unfamiliar to them; so a common naval academy curriculum was re-instituted in 1882, and Engineer Corps officers were merged into the unrestricted line in 1899. Junior Engineer Corps officers qualified for general line duties at sea, and senior Engineer Corps officers were restricted to shore assignments in their specialties. The restricted line officer concept of "engineering duty only" (EDO) was revived in 1916 when the Engineer Corps officers proved inadequately prepared for the expanded shipbuilding programs of World War I. The EDO designation expanded to include naval architects of the former Construction Corps when the two Corps were merged into the Bureau of Ships in 1940.

The consolidation with BuEng into BuShips had its origins when USS Anderson, first of the Sims-class destroyers to be delivered, was found to be heavier than designed and dangerously top-heavy in early 1939. It was determined that an underestimate by BuEng of the weight of a new machinery design was responsible, and that BuC&R did not have sufficient authority to detect or correct the error during the design process. Initially, Acting Secretary of the Navy Charles Edison proposed consolidation of the design divisions of the two bureaus. When the bureau chiefs could not agree on how to do this, he replaced both chiefs in September 1939. The consolidation was finally effected by a law passed by Congress on 20 June 1940.

== Commanding officers ==
Commanding and senior officers of the bureau were:

- 1862–1869: Benjamin Franklin Isherwood, engineer-in-chief
- 1869–1873: James Wilson King, engineer-in-chief
- 1873–1877: William Willis Wood, engineer-in-chief
- 1877–1883: William Henry Shock, commodore
- 1883–1887: Charles Harding Loring, commodore
- 1887–1903: George Wallace Melville, rear admiral
- 1903–1908: Charles Whiteside Rae, rear admiral
- 1908: John Kennedy Barton, rear admiral
- 1909–1913: Hutch Ingham Cone, rear admiral
- 1913–1921: Robert Stanislaus Griffin, rear admiral
- 1921–1925: John Keeler Robison, rear admiral
- 1925–1928: John Halligan Jr., rear admiral
- 1928–1931: Harry Ervin Yarnell, rear admiral
- 1931–1935: Samuel Murray Robinson, rear admiral
- 1935–1939: Harold Gardiner Bowen Sr., rear admiral
- 1939–1940: Samuel Murray Robinson, rear admiral

Rear Admiral Washington L. Capps was acting Chief of the Bureau between of the sudden retirement of Rear Adm. John K. Barton in December 1908 and the appointment of Rear Adm. Hutch I. Cone in May 1909.

== See also ==
- Board of Navy Commissioners
- Bureau of Ships
