= Daniel W. Hand =

U.S. Army brigadier general

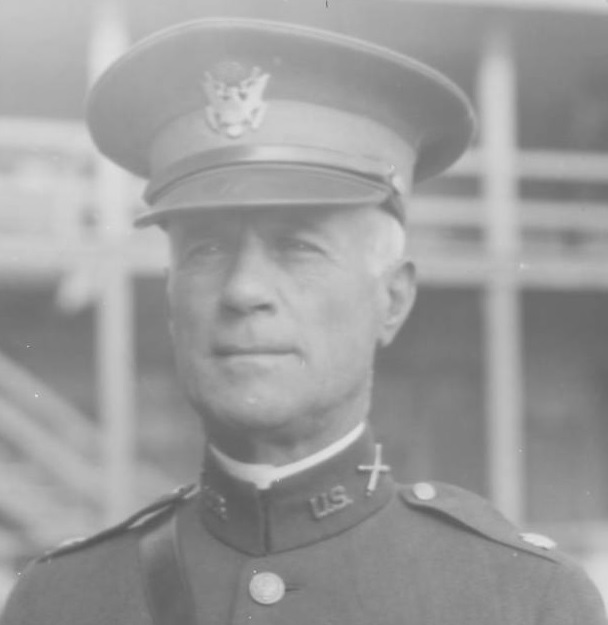
- Hand as a lieutenant colonel, probably c. 1924 when he was deputy commandant of the Field Artillery School
- Born: October 14, 1869; Saint Paul, Minnesota, U.S.
- Died: September 28, 1945 (aged 75); San Francisco, California, U.S.
- Burial place: Arlington National Cemetery
- Education: Shattuck Military Academy; University of Michigan (attended)
- Spouse(s): Elizabeth Knapp Metcalf (m. 1896–1932, her death); Ella Virginia Gayle (m. 1933–1945, his death)
- Children: 2
- Military career
- Service: United States Army
- Service years: 1898–1933
- Rank: Brigadier General
- Service number: 0–908
- Unit: U.S. Army Field Artillery Branch
- Commands: 2nd Battalion, 15th Minnesota Volunteer Infantry Regiment; Battery F, 1st Field Artillery Regiment; 3rd New York Field Artillery Regiment; Department of Firing, United States Army Field Artillery School; 16th Field Artillery Brigade; 25th Field Artillery Regiment; U.S. Relief Expedition to Japan; 24th Field Artillery Regiment; 7th Field Artillery Regiment; Fort Mason
- Wars: Spanish–American War; Philippine–American War; Pancho Villa Expedition; World War I
- Awards: Army Distinguished Service Medal; Silver Star

Daniel W. Hand (October 14, 1869 – September 28, 1945) was a career officer in the United States Army. A veteran of the Spanish–American War, Philippine–American War, Pancho Villa Expedition, and World War I, Hand attained the rank of brigadier general and was a recipient of the Army Distinguished Service Medal and Silver Star. He was best known for his command of Field Artillery units including the Department of Firing at the United States Army Field Artillery School and several Field Artillery regiments.

A native of Saint Paul, Minnesota, Hand graduated from Shattuck Military Academy and attended the University of Michigan Law School from 1888 to 1890. He pursued a business career until 1898, when he volunteered for military service during the Spanish–American War. Commissioned as a major in the 15th Minnesota Volunteer Infantry Regiment, he commanded the regiment's 2nd Battalion during its service in Minnesota, Pennsylvania, and Georgia. He remained in the army during the Philippine–American War as a captain in the 45th United States Volunteer Infantry. In August 1901 Hand received a regular army commission as a first lieutenant of Field Artillery. He served in Field Artillery postings of increasing responsibility throughout the United States, in addition to performing temporary quartermaster duties on several occasions. During the Pancho Villa Expedition, Hand commanded the 3rd New York Field Artillery as it performed border security near McAllen, Texas.

During World War I, Hand commanded a regiment and served as director of the Department of Firing at the Field Artillery School, then was promoted to temporary brigadier general as commander of a brigade. After the war, he reverted to his permanent rank of captain and continued to serve in Field Artillery assignments as he advanced to permanent colonel, including command of the 25th Field Artillery Regiment in the Philippines and command of the U.S. Relief Expedition to Japan following the 1923 Great Kantō earthquake. Hand closed his career as commander of the post at Fort Mason, California and artillery inspector on the staff of the Ninth Corps Area. Hand attained the mandatory retirement age of 64 in 1933, and retired as a brigadier general.

In retirement, Hand resided in Carmel-by-the-Sea, California. He died in San Francisco on September 28, 1945. Hand was buried at Arlington National Cemetery.

== Early life ==
Daniel Whilldin Hand was born in Saint Paul, Minnesota on October 14, 1869, the son of Daniel Whilldin Hand (1834–1889) and Susan Melville Egerton (1842–1877). Hand's father was a prominent doctor who served as a Union Army surgeon during the American Civil War. Hand attended Shattuck Military Academy, where he was High Mogul of the 5th Avenue Club, an unsanctioned social organization that was often involved in campus pranks and rivalries with other schools. Hand also commanded Shattuck's artillery company with the rank of cadet captain, and earned accolades for developing the company to a high level of proficiency. He attended the University of Michigan Law School from 1888 to 1890 as a special non-degree student, and became a member of the Chi Psi fraternity.

After completing his education, Hand worked in Saint Paul as the manager of his families financial holdings, including real estate loans, rental properties, and building lots. In addition, Hand worked as a sales representative for the Pine Tree Lumber Company of Little Falls, Minnesota.

== Start of career ==
In April 1898, Hand was one of several Shattuck graduates who held an organizational meeting and volunteered for Spanish–American War service, and he was elected president of the group, which agreed to form into a regiment and recruit additional volunteers. When the 15th Minnesota Infantry Regiment was officially created that summer, Hand was commissioned as one of its two majors and assigned to command the 2nd Battalion. The 15th Minnesota completed its initial organizing and training at Camp Ramsey, Minnesota and Camp George Meade, Pennsylvania.

The 15th Minnesota moved to Augusta, Georgia in October 1898. The regiment returned home following the end of the war, and was mustered out in March 1899. The U.S. Army subsequently began to raise federal volunteer regiments for service in the Philippine–American War, and Hand was commissioned a captain in the 45th United States Volunteer Infantry. Hand served with the regiment during organization and training at Fort Snelling, Minnesota.

Hand served in the Philippines from September 1899 to June 1901 and took part in 23 engagements. After returning to the United States, Hand applied for a regular army commission and in August 1901 received appointment as a first lieutenant of Artillery. He served briefly with the 121st Coast Artillery Company at Governors Island, New York, followed soon afterwards by the company's transfer to Key West, Florida. In September 1902, he was transferred to the 28th Field Artillery Company at Fort Leavenworth, Kansas.

In February 1904, Hand was assigned to Fort Monroe, Virginia and selected to attend the Artillery Officers Course. After graduating in July, he was assigned to the 25th Field Artillery Battery at Fort Riley, Kansas, followed by assignment to the 2nd Battery, also at Fort Riley. Hand was promoted to captain in January 1907.

== Continued career ==
After his promotion to captain, Hand was assigned to the 1st Field Artillery Regiment at the Presidio of San Francisco. Hand commanded the regiment's Battery F until February 1908, when he was assigned to act as the regimental quartermaster. In March 1908, he was detailed to Fort Barrancas, Florida, to supervise ongoing construction projects. In September 1908, he was assigned to the Philadelphia Quartermaster Depot as assistant to the chief quartermaster.

In April 1909, Hand was assigned as quartermaster of USAT Thomas, a troop transport ship based in San Francisco that made regular trips to the Philippines during the U.S. occupation. In March 1910, nationwide news reports indicated that Hand had been arrested in San Francisco on an unknown charge following his return from a trip to the Philippines. Subsequent news accounts indicated that the reports were erroneous, but Hand's orders to assume quartermaster duties aboard USAT Sherman were canceled and he was instead assigned to quartermaster duties at the San Francisco Quartermaster Depot. News reports in early May indicated that Hand was ill and confined to the hospital at the Presidio.

In late May 1910, Hand was arrested again and charged with being drunk on duty, violating a pledge to his commander that he would abstain from alcohol, and conduct unbecoming an officer. He was convicted in a July court-martial and sentenced to dismissal from the service. In August, Hand's dismissal was commuted by President William Howard Taft, who sentenced him to be reduced to the lowest place in seniority for Field Artillery captains for five years and confined to base for a year. After the court-martial, Hand returned to duty with the 1st Field Artillery in San Francisco.

In July 1911, the 1st Field Artillery was assigned to the Schofield Barracks, Hawaii Territory. In November 1912, Hand was transferred from the 1st Artillery to the 2nd Field Artillery Regiment at Vancouver Barracks, Washington. In June 1913, he was assigned to the 5th Field Artillery at Fort Sill, Oklahoma. In May 1915, Hand was detailed to serve as Field Artillery inspector and instructor for the New York National Guard.

== Later career ==
In June 1916, the New York National Guard was activated for federal service during the Pancho Villa Expedition. John F. O'Ryan, the commander of the New York Division, reorganized Buffalo's 65th Infantry Regiment as a heavy field artillery regiment, the 3rd New York Field Artillery, which he appointed Hand to command with the temporary rank of colonel. After completing organization and training, the regiment performed border security detail near McAllen, Texas. The 3rd New York Field Artillery returned to Buffalo and was mustered out in March 1917. Following the return of his regiment to New York, Hand was assigned to the War Department as instructor and inspector of National Guard artillery in New York and New England.

With the United States preparing for entry into World War I, in June 1917 Hand was assigned to Fort Niagara, New York as an artillery instructor for the post's officer training school. In the fall of 1917, Hand was assigned as second-in-command of the 308th Field Artillery Regiment at Fort Dix, New Jersey with the temporary rank of lieutenant colonel. From October 1917 to October 1918, Hand served as assistant director, then director of the Department of Firing at the Fort Sill Field Artillery School. In July 1918, he was promoted again to temporary colonel. In October 1918, Hand was promoted to temporary brigadier general. Hand briefly commanded the 16th Field Artillery Brigade at Camp Kearny, California, and he returned to Fort Sill following the Armistice of November 11, 1918.

In early 1919, Hand reverted to his permanent rank of captain and was assigned to the War Department staff, where he worked to demobilize wartime bases and dispose of land, buildings, and materiel in the real estate section of the Bureau of Purchase, Storage and Traffic. Later in 1919, he received promotion to major, then lieutenant colonel, and was assigned to Field Artillery training on the staff of the Militia Bureau.

In December 1921, Hand was assigned to the 25th Field Artillery Regiment, which was serving in the Philippines, and he commanded the regiment from April to September 1922. While in the Philippines, Hand was assigned to command the U.S. Relief Expedition to Japan as part of the international effort to provide assistance following the 1923 Great Kantō earthquake. In July 1924, he was assigned as assistant commandant of the Field Artillery School. In March 1925, Hand was assigned as assistant to the Chief of Field Artillery. In June 1926, he was promoted to colonel.

From December 1927 to October 1929, Hand commanded the 24th Field Artillery Regiment in the Philippines. He commanded the 7th Field Artillery Regiment at Fort Ethan Allen, Vermont from December 1929 to June 1931. After leaving the 7th Field Artillery, Hand was assigned to command the post at Fort Mason, California. Hand's final assignment was artillery inspector on the staff of the Ninth Corps Area at the Presidio. Hand retired after reaching the mandatory retirement age of 64 in October 1933. In 1930, the U.S. Congress passed legislation enabling World War I general officers to retire at the highest rank they had held, and at retirement Hand's rank of brigadier general was restored.

== Retirement and death ==
In retirement, Hand was a resident of Carmel-by-the-Sea, California. Among the civic activities in which he engaged was membership on the Monterey Peninsula Airport District board of directors. He died at Letterman Army Hospital at the Presidio of San Francisco on September 28, 1945. Hand was buried at Arlington National Cemetery.

== Awards ==
Hand was a recipient of the Army Distinguished Service Medal for his World War I service. While serving in the Philippines in 1900, Hand received the silver Citation Star for heroism. When the Silver Star was created in 1932, Hand's Citation Star was converted to the new award.

By virtue of his service in the Philippines, Hand was a member of the Military Order of the Carabao.

=== Legacy ===
As a result of his father's Civil War service, Hand was a hereditary member of the Military Order of the Loyal Legion of the United States.

Fort Sill's Hand Road is named for Hand, as is the post's Hand Hill, which is located near Medicine Bluff Creek. For several years after World War I, the New York National Guard awarded the Daniel W. Hand Trophy annually to the artillery battery that attained the highest proficiency in firing and maintenance.

== Family ==
In 1896, Hand married Elizabeth Knapp Metcalf (1873–1932). They were the parents of two children, Daniel (1897–1919) and Agnes (1899–1933). In 1933, he married Ella Virginia Gayle, to whom he remained married until his death.
