= Sharkfin Shoal Light =

Lighthouse in Maryland, United States

- Location: Southwest of Clay Island at the mouth of the Nanticoke River
- Coordinates: 38.2020°N 75.9868°W

Tower
- Constructed: 1892
- Foundation: screw-pile
- Construction: cast-iron/wood
- Height: 44 feet (13 m)
- Shape: hexagonal house

Light
- First lit: 1892
- Deactivated: 1964
- Focal height: 13.5 m (44 ft)
- Lens: fourth-order Fresnel lens
- Characteristic: white 6 sec flash with red sector

The Sharkfin Shoal Light was a screw-pile lighthouse located at the mouth of the Nanticoke River in the Chesapeake Bay, US.

== History ==
This light was constructed in 1892 to replace the Clay Island Light to the northeast.

During an accident on 21 December 1947, two men, Charles E. Palmquist and G. F. Cotte, died by Tangier Island in a boat departed close by from Sharfin Shoal Light that "burned on the water's edge". The investigation was led by Captain Morris G. Jory. The posthumous investigation was led by Lieutenant Commander Joseph R. Scullion.

Changed in 1950, the light pattern emitted from the lighthouse was altered to be "flashing every 10 seconds, flash two seconds, eclipse 8 seconds" with 600 white candlepower and 130 red candlepower. The change came into effect on October 27, and was switched from a manually operated station to an unattended, automatic station.

In 1964, the house was dismantled and a skeleton tower light placed on the foundation.

== List of lightkeepers ==
- Henry C. Sterling (April 1901-?)
- (Assistant) Walter C. Carew (?-31 August 1904)
- (Assistant) Addison S. Hall (December 1909-?)
