= Blakistone Island Light =

Lighthouse in Maryland, United States

Blackistone Island Light
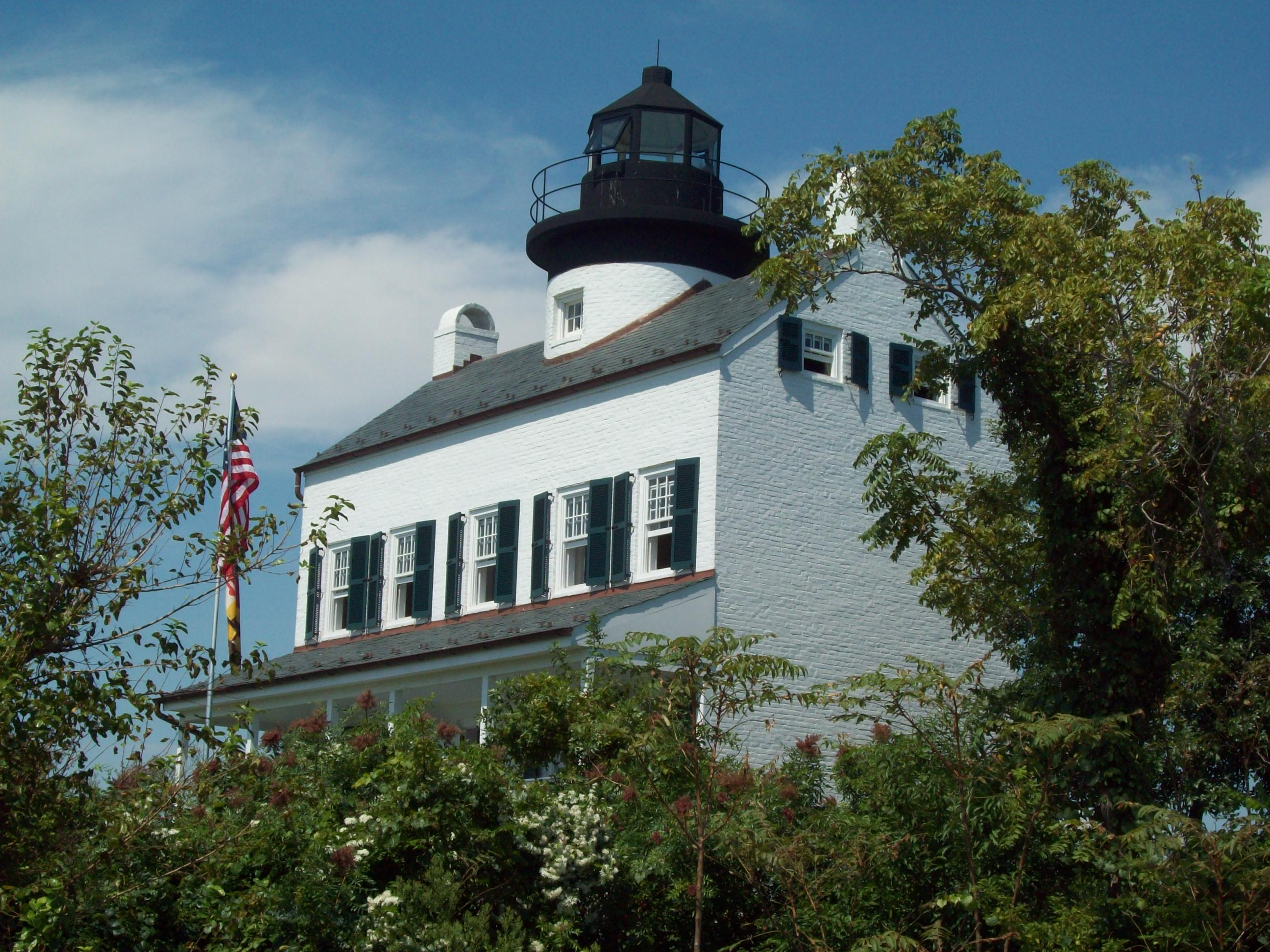
- Rebuilt lighthouse, September 2009
- Location: Southern point of present day Saint Clement's Island in the Potomac River
- Coordinates: 38°12′27″N 76°44′42″W

Tower
- Construction: wood
- Automated: 1932
- Shape: keeper's house with lantern on roof

Light
- First lit: 1851
- Deactivated: 1956

The Blackistone Island Light was a lighthouse located on what is now St. Clement's Island on the Potomac River in Maryland. It is best known as the target of a Confederate raid in the Civil War. Completed in 1851, the structure was destroyed by fire in 1956 and its shell was razed; a replica was completed in 2008.

The lighthouse replica can be visited on weekends from June through October. After driving to the St. Clement's Island Museum, one may take a water taxi on weekends and walk the grounds. A 50-foot (15 m) cross is also on the island. The lighthouse is open on Saturdays and the first Sunday of every month from June through October.

== History ==
Congress appropriated $3,500 for the construction of a lighthouse on the island in 1848; John Donahoo was awarded the contract, which cost $4,535. He designed an integral lighthouse, a two-story brick keeper's dwelling with a tower through its center, which sat on a 2-acre (0.81 ha) plot at the southern tip of the island. Construction was completed, and the light lit, in 1851.

The lighthouse, like many in the South, was a target for Confederate raiders. In 1864, CSA Captain John Goldsmith, a former owner of the island, led a party which destroyed the lighthouse lens and confiscated the oil used to light it; the group then declared its intent to destroy the structure. Keeper Jerome McWilliams, an acquaintance of the captain's, succeeded in convincing the men not to destroy the lighthouse because his wife was pregnant; he argued that destroying the family home would leave both her and the baby vulnerable.

The United States Navy purchased the island in 1919 and razed most structures on it, leaving only the lighthouse and building piers and a landing strip. The light was automated in 1932 and left unattended, gradually decaying over the next twenty years. Fire gutted the structure on July 16, 1956; to this day, the cause of the blaze is uncertain, but many suspect that a stray artillery round fired from the proving ground at Dahlgren, Virginia, may have been to blame. In any event, the Navy viewed the shell as a hazard and ordered it razed.

Through the efforts of the St. Clement's Hundred, a local community organization created for the preservation of St. Clement's Island, a replica of the Blackistone Lighthouse was constructed and completed in June 2008.

== Gallery ==
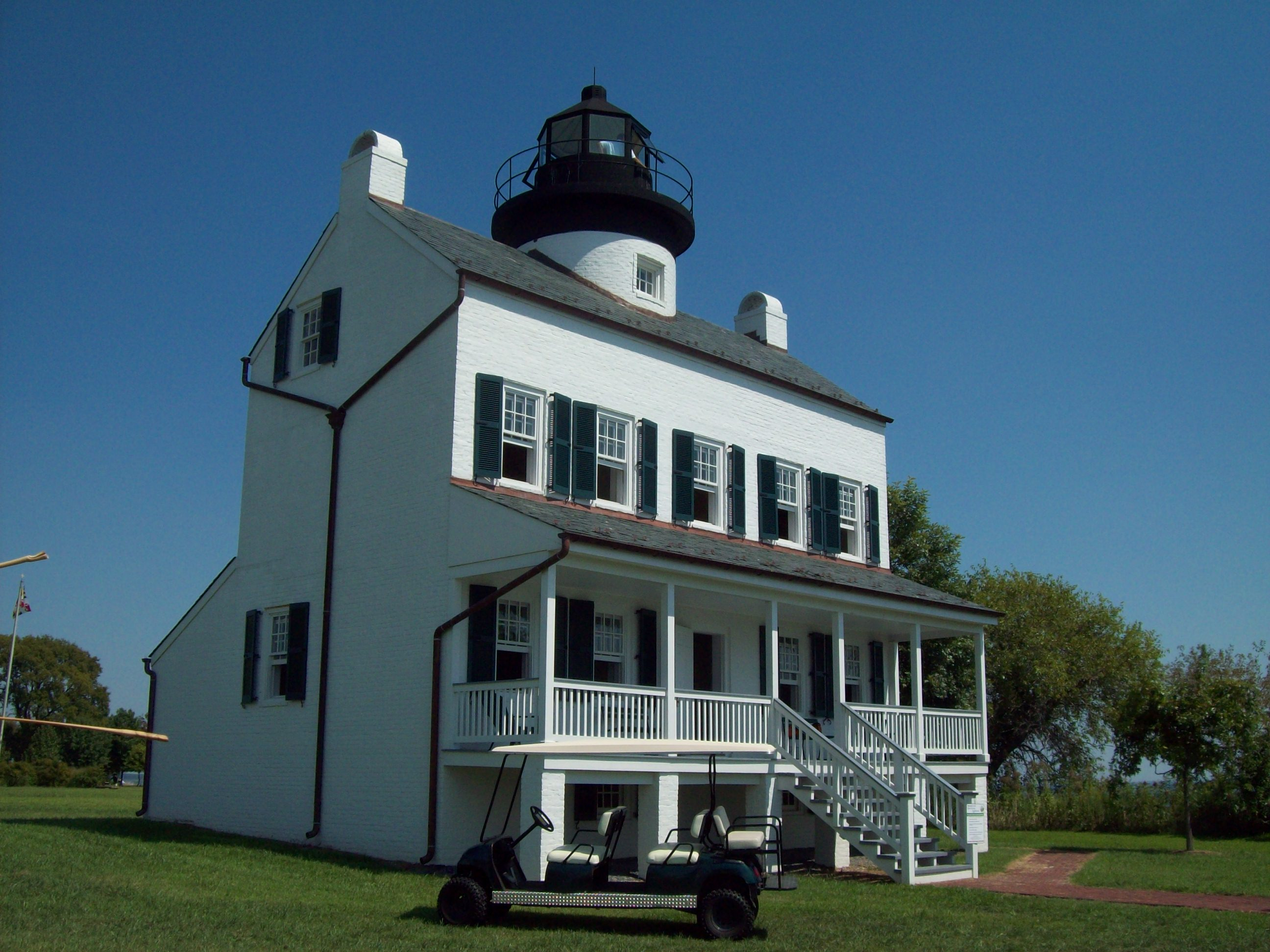
Rebuilt Blackistone Lighthouse, September 2009
