= Point Lookout State Park =

State park in St. Mary's County, Maryland, United States

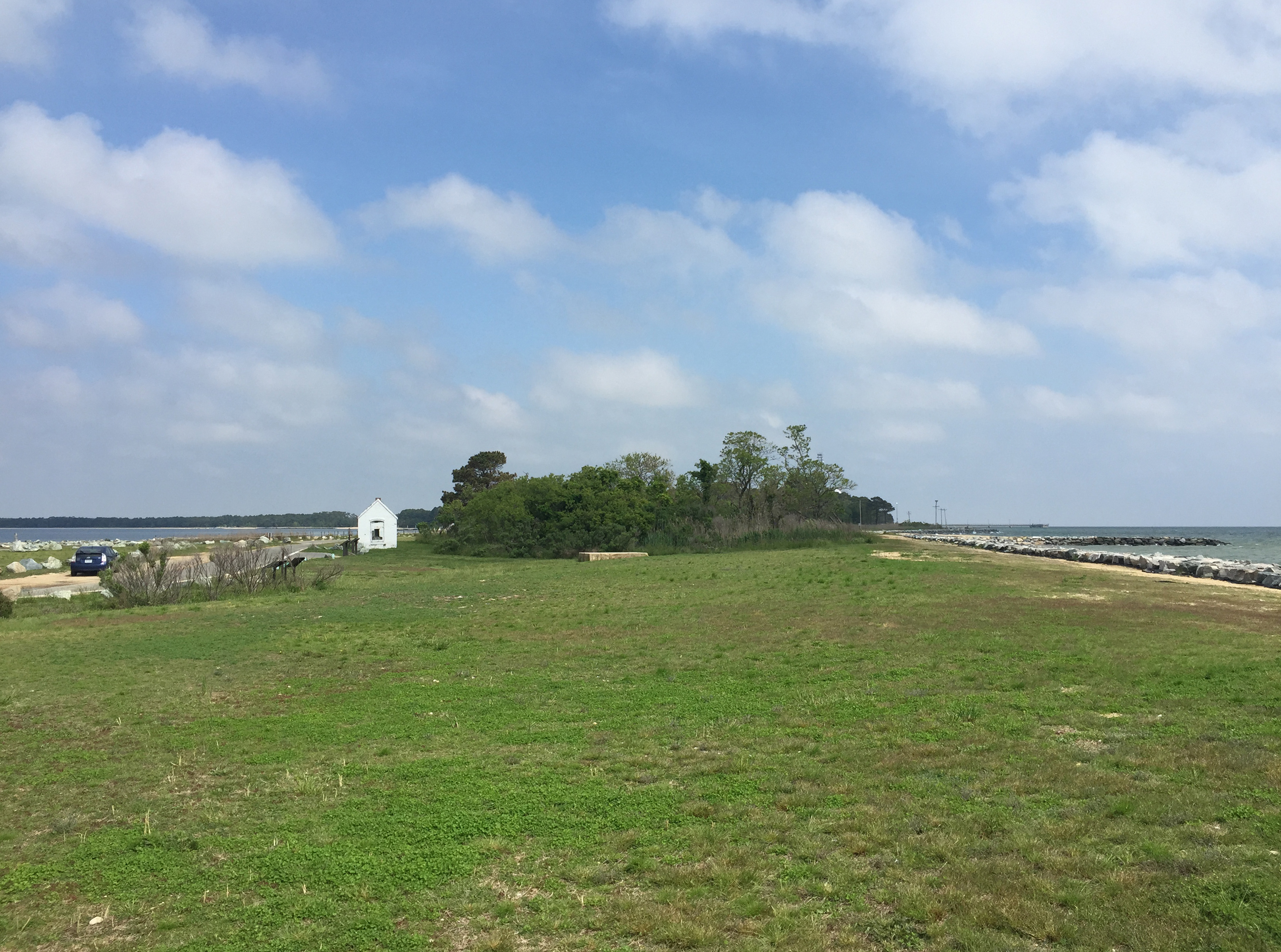
- View north from the lighthouse at Point Lookout

- Location within Maryland
- Location: St. Mary's County, Maryland, United States
- Nearest town: Lexington Park, Maryland
- Coordinates: 38°02′15″N 76°19′18″W
- Area: 1,083 acres (438 ha)
- Established: 1964
- Administrator: Maryland Department of Natural Resources
- Designation: Maryland state park
- Website: Official website

Point Lookout State Park is a Maryland state park occupying Point Lookout, the southernmost tip of a peninsula formed by the confluence of the Chesapeake Bay and the Potomac River in St. Mary's County, Maryland. The park preserves the site of an American Civil War prisoner of war camp and the Point Lookout Light, which was built in 1830. It is the southernmost spot on Maryland's western shore, the coastal region on the western side of the Chesapeake Bay.

== Colonial period ==
Captain John Smith, the famed explorer who surveyed the Mid-Atlantic region for the British Crown, came ashore at Point Lookout in 1608. He surveyed the lands and waters of the area, including the mouth of the Potomac River on the south side of Point Lookout and its small nearby tributary, the St. Mary's River. Smith gave very favorable reports on the area to the king of England, remarking on the abundant game and fishing opportunities, the fertile soil and the strategic military value of the area, overlooking the confluence of the Potomac River, Patuxent River and the St. Mary's River, along with its key vantage point on the Chesapeake Bay itself. All of these factors led him to describe it as a prime spot for a potential British colony.

The first settlement in Maryland occurred in 1634, in nearby St. Mary's City. At that time, Point Lookout became part of St. Michael's Manor, one of the main holdings of Leonard Calvert, the leader of the new colony and the first proprietary governor of colonial Maryland.

Because of its strategic position, Point Lookout was raided by British forces during the American Revolution.

== War of 1812 ==
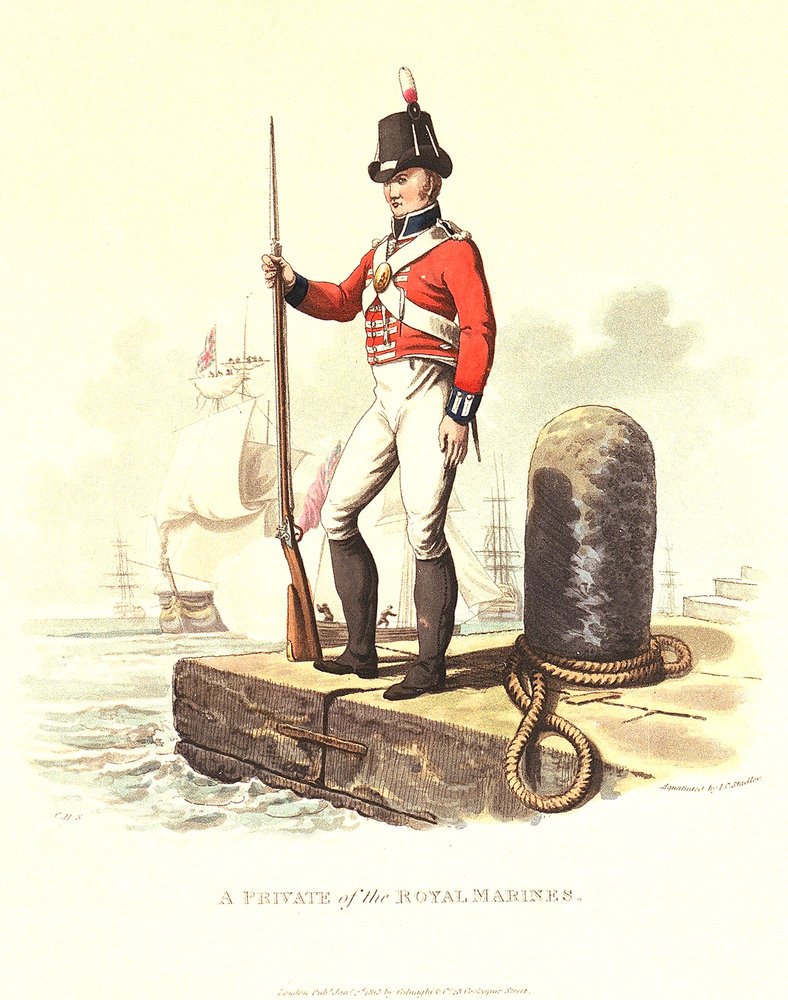
Royal Marines were stationed at Point Lookout during the British occupation in 1814 of the Chesapeake Campaign in the War of 1812.

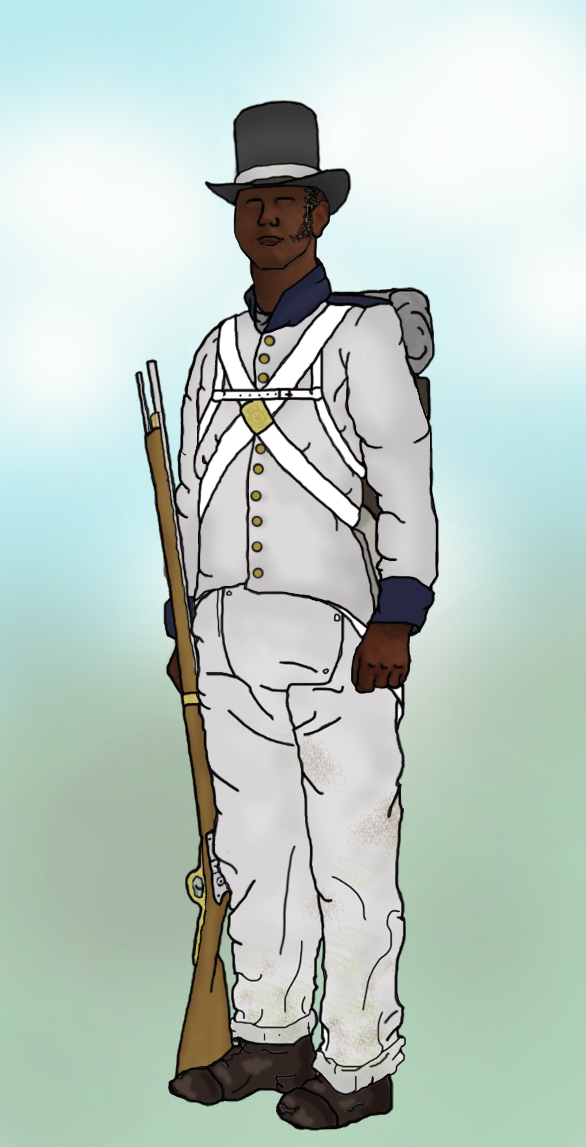
British Colonial Marines of the Corps of Colonial Marines were stationed at Point Lookout during the British occupation in 1814 of the Chesapeake Campaign in the War of 1812.

=== Origin of area name, "Point Lookout" ===
Originally named St. Michael's Point in 1634, the name Point Lookout was adopted as early as Emanuel Bowen's "New and Accurate Map of Virginia & Maryland", published in 1747, though it may have been renamed earlier. Point Lookout served as a lookout post in both the American Revolution and the War of 1812, during which it was used to monitor British ship movements.

During the War of 1812 the Chesapeake Bay was a major route for British War ships, who established a naval and military base at near-by Tangier Island in Virginia for the Royal Navy under Rear Admiral George Cockburn with Fort Albion there, which constantly raided Chesapeake Bay waterfront towns, villages and farms and scattered community residents, and also eventually attacked and burned Washington, D.C., and unsuccessfully attacked the City of Baltimore during 1813 and 1814.

=== Citizen militia post riders ===
During the War of 1812, a local citizen militia in St. Mary's County established a clandestine base on Point Lookout to monitor movements of British warships on Chesapeake Bay. The militia also established a secret nighttime system of post riders to send intelligence reports from Point Lookout to Washington, D.C., in order to keep President James Madison up to date on British movements. St. Mary's County's roads were notoriously rough at the time, and the trek by horse was more than 80 miles, so a relay system was set up, passing messages from one rider to the next.

=== British forces take Point Lookout ===
The citizen militia worked clandestinely in the area for over a year, until the British came ashore, seized and occupied Point Lookout. The militia was no match for the overwhelming power and number of seasoned British ground troops. This had the effect of blinding American intelligence efforts in the region, and is thought to have contributed to the eventual Burning of Washington in August 1814 by British troops. President Madison and United States Secretary of War, John Armstrong, Jr. was later faulted for not aiding the militia in Point Lookout.

== American Civil War ==
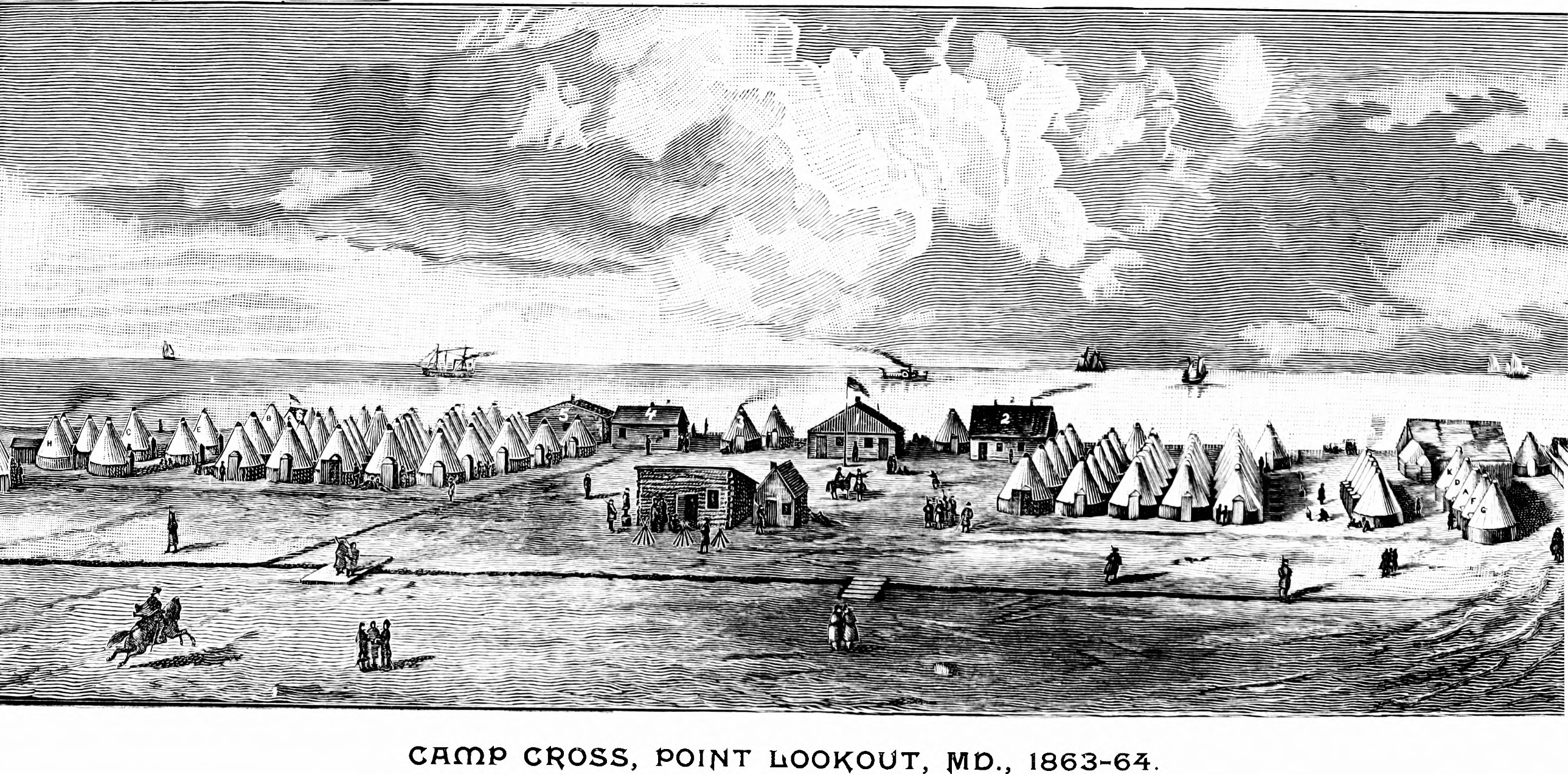
Camp Cross, a Union Army camp at Point Lookout, Maryland, from 1863 to 1864

=== Establishment of prisoner-of-war camp ===
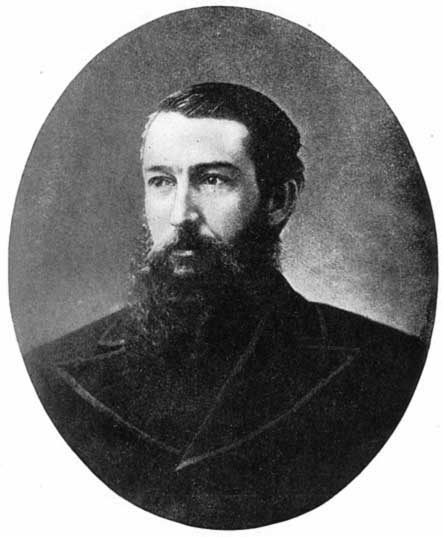
Sidney Lanier, poet, musician and academic, was a Confederate prisoner in Point Lookout

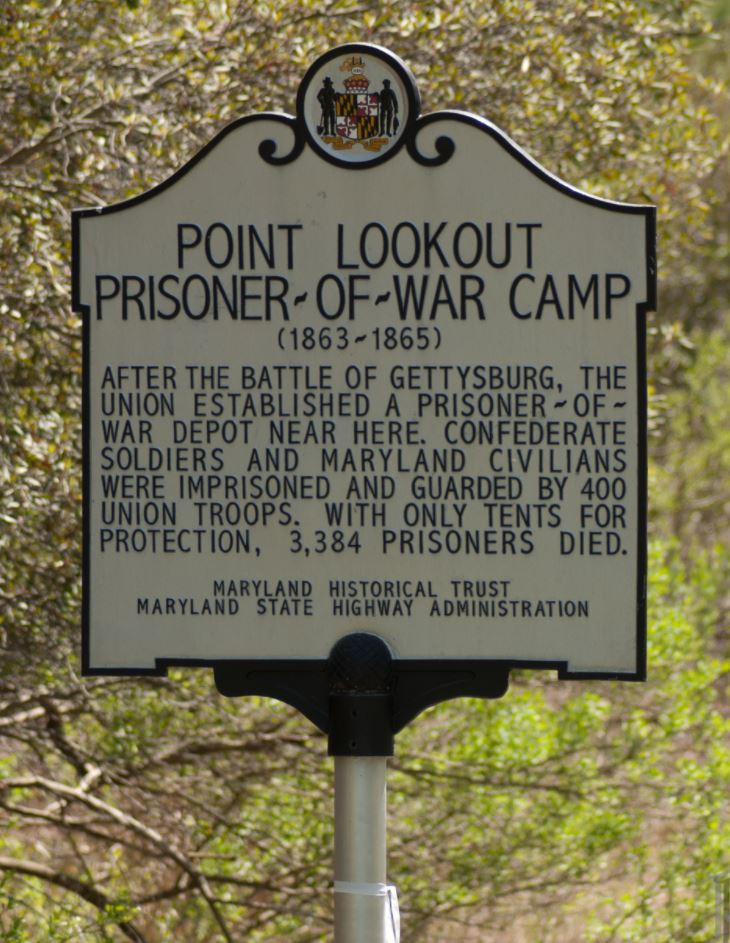
Point Lookout prisoner of war camp historical marker

In 1862, during the American Civil War, much of the land around Point Lookout was transformed into a bustling port and temporary city of civilians and military personnel and numerous buildings, including a large Union Army hospital, a United States Army garrison at Fort Lincoln, and a Union prisoner of war camp to hold Confederate States Army soldier captives.

=== Prisoners of war held, conditions ===
At the Battle of Gettysburg in July 1863, Union forces captured thousands of Confederate soldiers. Point Lookout was one of numerous military facilities hastily established as prisoner of war camps. Officially named Camp Hoffman, the 40-acre prison compound was established north of Hammond Hospital. A 15-foot tall wooden fence surrounded the compound, while guards kept watch from a gallery at the top of the fence.

According to the Maryland Department of Natural Resources, of the 50,000 soldiers held in the army prison camp at Lookout Point, all of whom were housed in tents, nearly 4,000 died. The death rate of 8 percent was less than half of the death rate among soldiers who were in the field with their own armies. The camp, originally built to hold 10,000 men, swelled to between 12,000 and 20,000 prisoners after the exchange of prisoners between armies was placed on hold. The result was crowded conditions with up to sixteen men to a tent in poor sanitary conditions. It was the largest Union-run prison camp and its reputation was one of the worst.

== War memorial and cemetery ==
=== Mass grave ===
The mass grave holds 3,384 Confederate prisoners of war who died at the prison camp. The grave is marked by a pillar inscribed at its base with the names of the dead. The privately funded Confederate Memorial Park occupies a three-acre site next to the cemetery. Although a United States flag is flown in front of the memorial, a prominent Confederate flag is situated on a flagpole just outside the gates of the grounds, in memory of those dead Southern soldiers.

=== Archeological remains ===
Because of the extensive water erosion of the Chesapeake Bay shoreline in the last 150 years, half of the original site of the prisoner of war stockade has been obliterated and washed away by the bay.

== State park and beaches ==
Today, Point Lookout State Park retains Point Lookout Light, the original lighthouse built in 1830, a fishing pier, boat launch facilities, public beaches and facilities, overnight camping, Civil War historical remains, and, reputedly, ghosts.

== Notable people ==
- Sidney Lanier, poet, musician, and academic was a Confederate prisoner of war at Point Lookout.

== In popular culture ==
An expansion pack for the 2008 video game Fallout 3, titled Point Lookout, is set in a post-apocalyptic version of Point Lookout and its surrounding areas.

== See also ==
- American Civil War
  - Prisoner of war mail (Civil War era)
  - List of Civil War POW prisons and camps
- History of Maryland
