= USS Isherwood (DD-284) =

Clemson-class destroyer

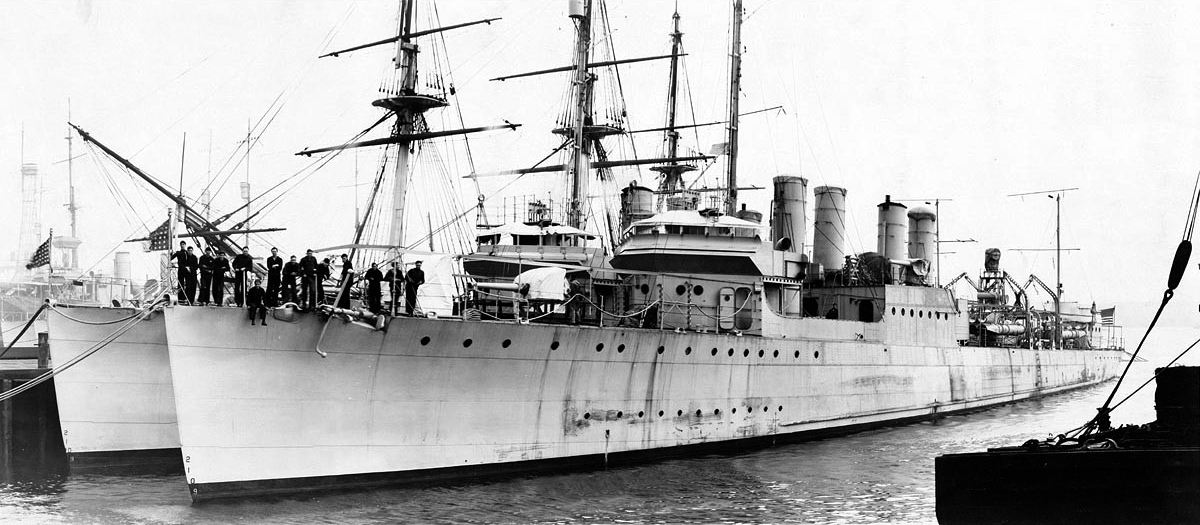

History

United States
- Namesake: Benjamin F. Isherwood
- Builder: Bethlehem Shipbuilding Corporation, Squantum Victory Yard
- Laid down: 24 May 1919
- Launched: 10 September 1919
- Commissioned: 4 December 1919
- Decommissioned: 1 May 1930
- Stricken: 22 October 1930
- Fate: Sold for scrapping, 17 January 1931

General characteristics
- Class & type: Clemson-class destroyer
- Displacement: 1,190 tons
- Length: 314 ft 5 in (95.83 m)
- Beam: 31 ft 8 in (9.65 m)
- Draft: 9 ft 10 in (3.0 m)
- Propulsion: 26,500 shp (20 MW); geared turbines, twin propellers
- Speed: 35 knots (65 km/h)
- Range: 4,900 nmi (9,100 km); @ 15 kt
- Complement: 120 officers and enlisted
- Armament: 4 × 4 in (102 mm)/50 guns, 2 × 3 in (76 mm)/25 guns, 12 × 21 inch (533 mm) torpedo tubes

USS Isherwood (DD-284) was a Clemson-class destroyer in service with the United States Navy from 1919 to 1930. She was scrapped in 1931.

== History ==
Isherwood was named for Rear Admiral Benjamin F. Isherwood. She was launched on 10 September 1919 by the Bethlehem Shipbuilding Corporation, Squantum, Massachusetts; sponsored by Mrs. R. C. Walling; and commissioned on 4 December 1919 at the Boston Navy Yard.

=== Deployments ===
As a unit of the 43d Division, 1st Squadron, Destroyer Force, Atlantic Fleet, Isherwood conducted shakedown out of Boston until 26 January 1920 when she sailed for Cuba via Newport, Rhode Island. Arriving Guantanamo Bay 3 February she remained there engaging in target practice and drills until departing 26 April, escorting the battleship Pennsylvania to receive the Secretary of the Navy at Lynnhaven Roads, Virginia. Following this assignment, Isherwood proceeded to Mexico for patrol duty on the Mexican coast until 21 June when she arrived in Boston for repairs. She sailed 21 October for Charleston, South Carolina to join the Destroyers in Reserve.

=== Reserve status ===
Isherwood stayed in reserve status until 10 May 1921 when, with 50 percent complement, she sailed to the Boston Navy Yard, where she joined the Destroyer Force. Operating with reduced complement, she transported Naval Reservists between Boston and Newport and engaged in target practice until 4 August. Following repairs at the Boston Navy Yard (13 March – 8 May 1922), Isherwood joined Destroyer Squadron 9 at Philadelphia and proceeded to Yorktown, Virginia, for exercises with the Fleet. She maneuvered in the area until 3 January 1923 when she rendezvoused with the Scouting Fleet Destroyers for training in the Caribbean; at Beaufort, North Carolina; and at Baltimore, Maryland. She continued her readiness operations in the Caribbean until 28 March 1925.

On 7 May 1925, Isherwood, arrived Boston for a Naval Reserve cruise from Maine to the District of Columbia. She rejoined her squadron at Newport 31 August, and arrived at Guantanamo 24 September for maneuvers in the Caribbean. Having completed exercises with the Fleet, Isherwood arrived in Portsmouth, Virginia, 13 April, and departed 12 June for France via Newport and the Azores. Isherwood arrived St. Nazaire 29 June; she then conducted a good will cruise to various British and Mediterranean ports.

After her arrival in Boston 15 July 1927, Isherwood resumed her schedule of reservist training cruises and fleet maneuvers in the Caribbean until June 1929.

=== Decommissioning ===
From Jacksonville, Florida, she received Naval Reservists for a summer cruise (Maine to Massachusetts) 29 June, and following their disembarkation 20 July, she underwent repairs at Newport and overhaul at Norfolk. Kalmia (AT-23) towed her from Norfolk to the Philadelphia Navy Yard 26 August, and she decommissioned there 1 May 1930. She was sold 17 January 1931, and scrapped in 1934 by her purchasers.
