= Brian Isherwood =

New Zealand cricketer (born 1946)

Personal information
- Full name: Brian Philip Isherwood
- Born: 18 June 1946 (age 80); Christchurch, New Zealand
- Batting: Left-handed

Domestic team information
- Years: Team
- 1962/63–1977/78: Ashburton County
- 1966/67–1972/73: Canterbury

Career statistics
Competition	First-class	List A
Matches	10	2
Runs scored	237	3
Batting average	14.81	3.00
100s/50s	1/0	0/0
Top score	74*	3
Catches/stumpings	20/4	4/0
- Source: Cricinfo, 24 February 2010

Brian Philip Isherwood (born 18 June 1946) is a New Zealand former cricketer who played for Canterbury in the Plunket Shield and for Ashburton County in the Hawke Cup. He was a specialist wicketkeeper. In 1971–72 he and Cran Bull added an unbeaten 184 for Canterbury against Central Districts at Trafalgar Park, Nelson.

Isherwood is a notable figure in the classic car community, particularly recognised for preserving the Fiat 124 Sport Coupe.
