= USS Isherwood (DD-520) =

Fletcher-class destroyer

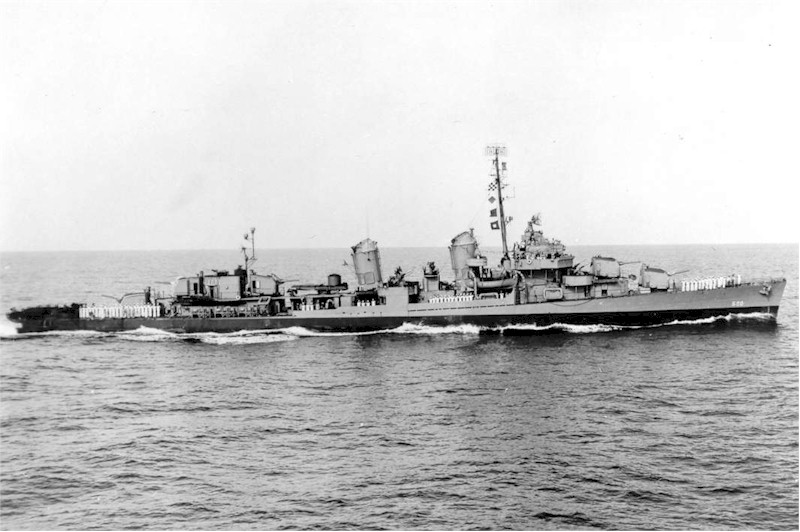
- USS Isherwood (DD-520)

History

United States
- Namesake: Benjamin F. Isherwood
- Builder: Bethlehem Mariners Harbor, Staten Island
- Laid down: 12 May 1942
- Launched: 24 November 1942
- Commissioned: 12 April 1943
- Decommissioned: 11 September 1961
- Stricken: 15 January 1974
- Fate: Loaned to Peru, 8 October 1961

Peru
- Name: Almirante Guise (DD-72)
- Acquired: 8 October 1961
- Stricken: 1981
- Fate: Scrapped in 1981

General characteristics
- Class & type: Fletcher-class destroyer
- Displacement: 2,050 tons
- Length: 376 ft 6 in (114.7 m)
- Beam: 39 ft 8 in (12.1 m)
- Draft: 17 ft 9 in (5.4 m)
- Propulsion: 60,000 shp (45 MW); 2 propellers
- Speed: 35 knots (65 km/h; 40 mph)
- Range: 6500 nmi. (12,000 km) at 15 kt
- Complement: 336
- Armament: 5 × single Mk 12 5 in (127 mm)/38 guns; 5 × twin 40 mm (1.6 in) Bofors AA guns; 7 × single 20 mm (0.8 in) Oerlikon AA guns; 2 × quintuple 21 in (533 mm) torpedo tubes; 6 × single depth charge throwers; 2 × depth charge racks

USS Isherwood (DD-520), a Fletcher-class destroyer, was the second ship of the United States Navy to be named for Rear Admiral Benjamin F. Isherwood (1822–1915).

Isherwood was launched by Bethlehem Shipbuilding Co., Staten Island, N.Y., 24 November 1942, sponsored by Mrs. A. J. Kerwin, granddaughter of Rear Admiral Isherwood; and commissioned 12 April 1943 at New York Navy Yard.

The new destroyer conducted her shakedown training in Casco Bay, Maine, and off Guantanamo Bay, Cuba, through April and May. During the next 2 months she operated with a patrol and escort group out of NS Argentia, Newfoundland, and on 5 August 1943 departed for England with troop ship RMS Queen Mary. Isherwood arrived Scapa Flow 19 August to carry out combined operations with the British Home Fleet, including a search toward Spitzbergen for German battleship Tirpitz. Sailing 14 September, the destroyer returned to Boston with a convoy 29 September 1943.

Isherwood was subsequently reassigned to the Pacific, sailing from Boston 14 November for San Francisco. From there she steamed to Pearl Harbor and sailed 11 December to join Task Force 94 (TF 94) in the Aleutians. For the next eight months, Isherwood carried out antisubmarine sweeps of the cold Alaskan waters. In June she took part in bombardments of the Kurile Islands, finally arriving San Francisco for repairs 15 August 1944.

== Philippines invasion ==
Isherwood sailed for Pearl Harbor 26 August 1944 to take part in the long-awaited invasion of the Philippines, scheduled for October. She arrived at Manus on 4 October and steamed into Leyte Gulf with the assault force 20 October, carrying out escort and patrol duties during the first days of the operation. She also provided gunfire support and night illumination fire. Isherwood remained in the assault area during the giant four-part Battle for Leyte Gulf 23–26 October, in which the Japanese surface fleet was all but annihilated. During November the ship escorted convoys from advance bases to the Philippines in support of the buildup there.

The next major invasion of the Philippines campaign was to be at Lingayen Gulf. Isherwood joined Vice Admiral Theodore S. Wilkinson's Lingayen Attack Force at Manus, sailing 27 December. During the voyage through the islands from Leyte to Lingayen, the transport groups and carrier task groups were attacked incessantly by kamikazes, but even these desperate attacks could not stop the invasion. Isherwood shot down at least one suicide plane and assisted in splashing others before arriving the assault area 9 January 1945. She screened a landing craft group during the landing, sailing for Leyte with a returning group 11 January. During the last days of the month, specifically 29 and 30 January, the ship returned to Luzon to support the unopposed landings at San Antonio and Subic Bay, as ground units moved on Manila. Isherwood remained in the Philippines providing antisubmarine protection and patrolling until mid-March.

== Okinawa invasion ==
Isherwood sailed for the Okinawa operation 21 March 1945; and, after her arrival 5 days later, took part in the landings on Kerama Retto preparatory to the main assault on Okinawa. Troops from the main task force stormed ashore 1 April in the biggest amphibious operation of the Pacific war, and 2 days later Isherwood moved to a position off the beaches for fire support missions. This continued until 16 April, when the ship was sent to aid stricken destroyers Pringle (DD-477) and Laffey (DD-724) off Ie Shima. That afternoon she took over Laffey's duties as fighter director ship on picket station.

The days that followed found Isherwood in numerous heavy air raids, as the Japanese made a desperate attempt to drive off the invasion fleet with suicide planes. While on station 22 April a kamikaze made a dusk attack on the destroyer and crashed No. 3 gun mount. One veteran described the kamikaze pilot as: "a jockey riding in on a horse." Many fires were started by the D3A1 "Val" dive bomber and his 500-pound bomb, but all were quickly extinguished except the one in the depth charge rack aft. After 25 minutes of dangerous fire-fighting, the charge exploded, causing great damage in the after engine room. Isherwood arrived Kerama Retto with over 80 men killed, wounded, or missing.

== After the war ==
Isherwood arrived Ulithi for repairs 9 May 1945 and steamed into San Francisco Bay 3 June. She finished her overhaul just as the Pacific war ended; and, after training exercises, sailed 3 October for New York. After taking part in the Navy Day Presidential Review, the ship steamed to Charleston, where she decommissioned 1 February 1946 and was placed in the Atlantic Reserve Fleet.

Isherwood recommissioned at Charleston 5 April 1951, and after shakedown and training in the Caribbean steamed into Newport, her new home port, 6 August. Plane guard duty off Jacksonville and operations in Narragansett Bay occupied her through the end of 1951. She then sailed for a cruise with the 6th Fleet in the Mediterranean, departing 22 April 1952, and, for the next 6 months, visited various ports supporting the important peace-keeping operations of the fleet. She returned to her home port 17 October 1952.

Isherwood made another 6th Fleet cruise 22 April – 26 October 1953, after which she took part in maneuvers and plane guard duty off the East Coast. In June 1954 the ship underwent refresher training out of Guantanamo Bay, and sailed from Newport 30 November 1954 to join the Pacific Fleet.

The veteran ship arrived San Diego via the Panama Canal 15 December 1954, and got underway for the Far East 4 January 1955. During this cruise she operated mainly in the Philippines, with a period on Taiwan Patrol in April and May 1955. Her part in these important 7th Fleet operations ended in June and she arrived San Diego the 19th for additional training and readiness steaming. 1956, however, brought Isherwood back to these troubled waters, as she spent the period January–July on operations off Taiwan, Malaya, and Japan.

The destroyer returned to the Far East in 1957, making stops in Sydney, Perth and Darwin, Australia with the three other destroyers of DesDiv 211, DesRon 21. This was the first US Navy visit to an Australian port, and the country welcomed the ships by opening a national park in Sidney, commemorating the Battle of Coral Sea.

During the 1958, she steamed off Taiwan during the tense Quemoy-Matsu crisis, when American forces afloat helped prevent a flareup between Nationalist and Communist China. The ship returned to her home port of San Diego on 7 December 1958, and spent the first 6 months of 1959 on maneuvers and training exercises after refitting in Mare Island (Vallejo) Navy Yard. Isherwood then sailed for her fifth 7th Fleet cruise 1 August 1959. During the next months she operated with carrier Lexington (CV-16) in the South China Sea, helping to limit the fighting in Laos and lending strength to United Nations efforts to find a solution. After additional flight operations and fleet exercises, the ship sailed for San Diego 29 November 1959.

In 1960 Isherwood took part in training operations, including a summer NROTC midshipmen training cruise, until sailing again for 7th Fleet duty 18 October. She served on Taiwan Patrol and took part in an amphibious exercise on Okinawa before arriving San Diego 27 March 1961.

Isherwood engaged in training off California until decommissioning 11 September 1961.

== Peruvian service ==
Isherwood was loaned to Peru on 8 October 1961 who renamed the ship BAP Almirante Guise (DD-72). She was stricken and scrapped in 1981.

== Awards ==
Isherwood received five battle stars for World War II service.
