= Point Lookout Light =

Lighthouse in Maryland, United States

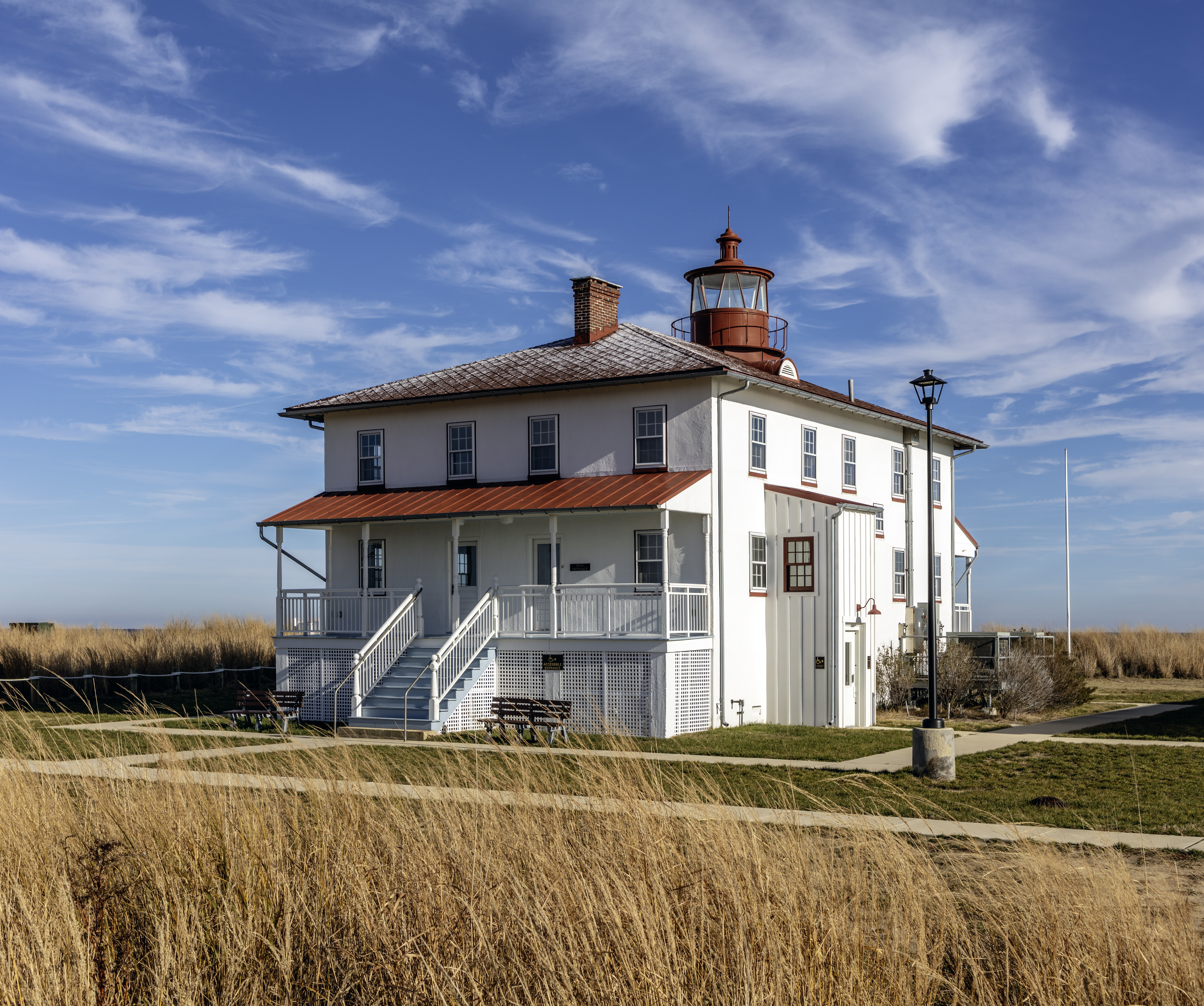
- Point Lookout Light in 2023
- Location: Point Lookout at the mouth of the Potomac River
- Coordinates: 38.0387°N 76.3221°W

Tower
- Constructed: 1830
- Construction: Wood, brick
- Height: 41 feet (12 m) (originally 24 feet (7.3 m))
- Shape: Keeper's house with lantern on roof

Light
- First lit: 1830
- Deactivated: 1966
- Focal height: 12 m (39 ft)
- Lens: Fourth order Fresnel lens
- Characteristic: Fl(2) W 5s

Point Lookout Light is a lighthouse that marks the entrance to the Potomac River at the southernmost tip of Maryland's western shore of the Chesapeake Bay, south of the town of Scotland in Saint Mary's County, Maryland, USA. The lighthouse is located in Point Lookout State Park. The lighthouse is now open to the public, as of May 2025, as a museum during the summertime.

== History ==
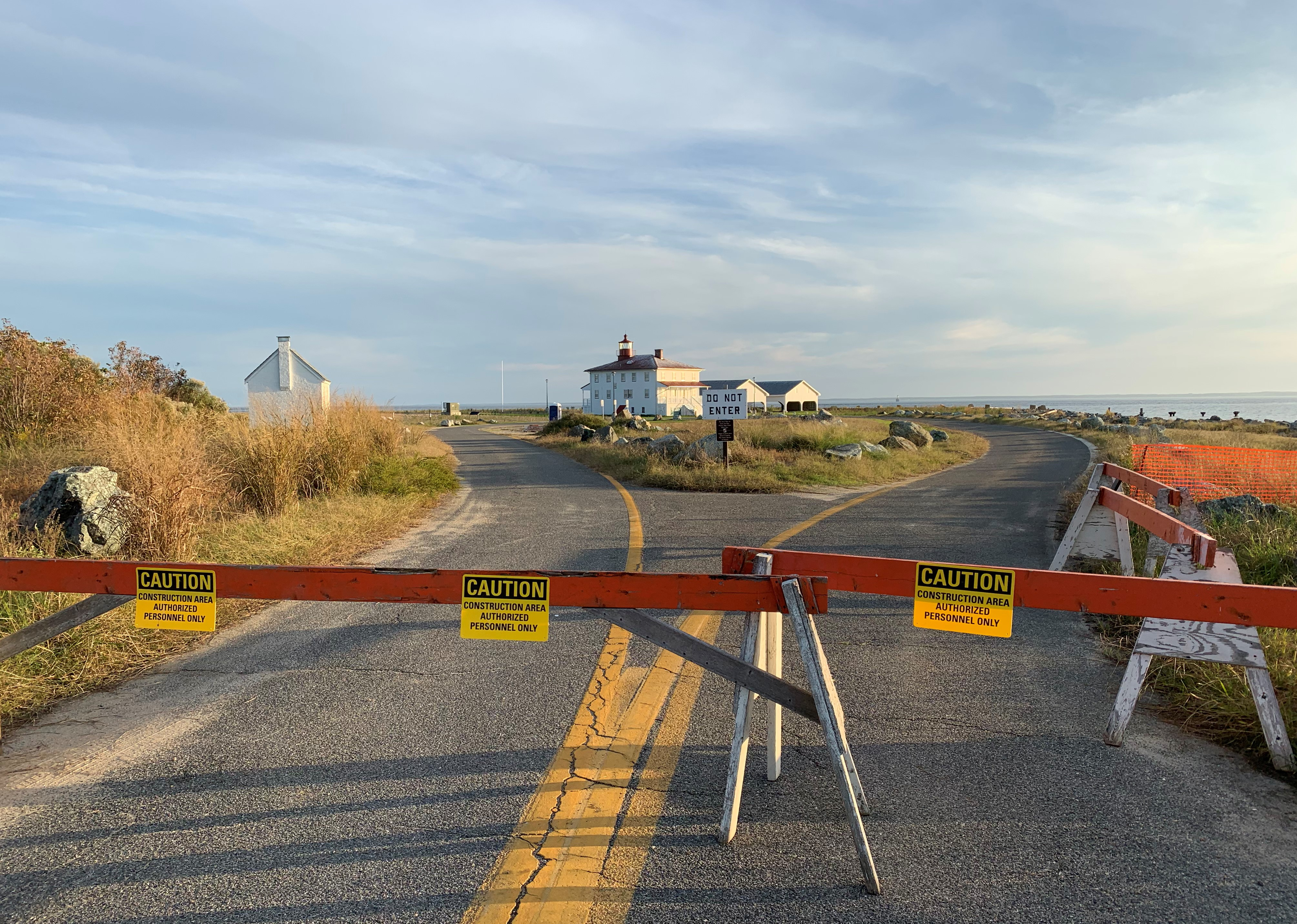
Point Lookout Light, looking from north to south.

On May 3, 1825, the federal government decided that a light was needed at Point Lookout to warn ships of the shoals and to mark the entrance to the Potomac River, and appropriated $1,800 for the project. The owner, Jenifer Taylor, refused the offer of $500 for the land, though he apparently offered to accept this price if he were named keeper. The purchase was delayed and eventually a county commission set a value of $1,150. Because of the cost overruns for the land purchase, Congress appropriated $4,500 on May 23, 1828, and awarded a contract on July 22, 1830, to John Donahoo for $3,050. Construction commenced before the deed to the land was obtained and Jenifer Taylor argued with the government until the matter was resolved some 2 years after the lighthouse became operational. Donahoo built a story-and-a-half house which was first lit on September 20, 1830, by keeper James Davis. Davis died a few months after taking the oath of office and his daughter, Ann Davis, kept the light until 1847.

In 1854, the light was upgraded with a fourth-order Fresnel lens. The Civil War completely transformed the point. First, the Hammond General Hospital was built in 1862 to care for Union wounded. In 1863, Confederate prisoners began to be held at the hospital; and soon Camp Hoffman, a vast prison camp, was built, eventually holding 20,000 prisoners, of whom more than 3,000 died due to the harsh conditions, limited food rations and poor shelter from the elements.

A fog bell tower was added in 1873. In 1883, the lighthouse was raised to two full stories with a summer kitchen and additional bedroom added at the southwest corner. Also in 1883, a buoy repair depot was built on the south side of the light; in 1884, a coal storage shed was built to the south of the buoy repair depot. The new structures obscured the fog bell, which was then replaced with a new fog bell on the east end of the coal storage shed. In 1927, the lighthouse was converted to a duplex, more than doubling the size of the building. The duplex allowed for a keeper and assistant keeper to live on-site and still have some privacy.

The light was served by civilian and Coast Guard keepers. In 1939, the United States Coast Guard took over control of all U.S. lighthouses, and the keepers were pressured, but not required, to join the Coast Guard. In 1951, the United States Navy began buying property around the light. On January 11, 1966, the light was deactivated and the structures were turned over to the Navy. Civilians continued to live in the house until 1981, when a dispute over a failing well led to the revocation of a 99-year lease that the state had with the Navy.

The fog bell tower was moved to the Chesapeake Bay Maritime Museum in 1968. Throughout the 1960s, the State of Maryland purchased land north of the lighthouse and carved out the Point Lookout State Park. In 2006, the light was turned over to Maryland as part of a land-swap deal. Also in 2006, the Point Lookout Lighthouse Preservation Society was founded to restore the lighthouse complex to the 1927 era. The lighthouse is owned by Maryland and was previously accessible only one day a month from April to November by volunteers of the Point Lookout Lighthouse Preservation Society.

The lighthouse underwent extensive exterior and interior renovations beginning in 2017, involving the re-stabilization of the structure, repairs of multiple leaks, replacement of drywall and timbers, rebuilding of stairways and the re-finishing of the former living quarters. After an additional round of renovations beginning in 2024, the Point Lookout Lighthouse was converted into a small self-guided museum, operated by the Maryland Park Service, with historical exhibits, information, a small gift shop, and furniture set up throughout both levels of the duplex building. Visitors are also granted access to the cupola atop the building where the lantern once resided before it was decommissioned and removed. These renovations and installations were completed in early 2025, and the lighthouse was made officially open to the public starting May 15, 2025. It is open from May to September, Thursday through Monday, from 9AM to 5PM, for park visitors to freely explore.

== Sources ==
- "Historic Light Station Information and Photography: Maryland" (PDF). United States Coast Guard Historian's Office.
- Point Lookout Light, from the Chesapeake Chapter of the United States Lighthouse Society
- Point Lookout Lighthouse, from Lighthousefriends
- de Gast, Robert (1973). The Lighthouses of the Chesapeake. Johns Hopkins University Press. pp. 58–61. ISBN 9780801815485.
