= USNS Benjamin Isherwood =

Oiler of the United States Navy

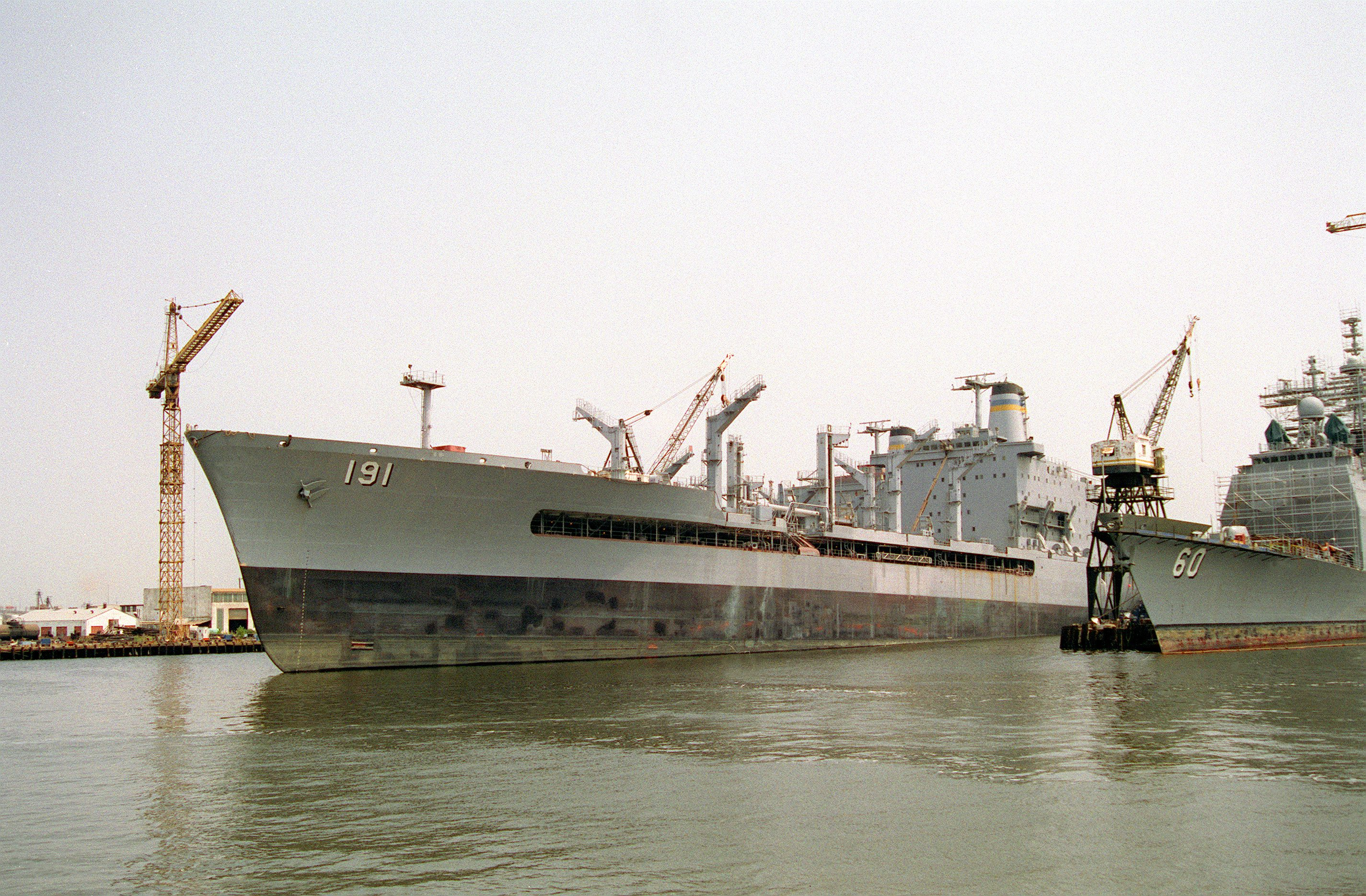
- USNS Benjamin Isherwood (T-AO-191), left, being prepared for long-term storage at the Norfolk Shipbuilding and Dry Dock Company in Norfolk, Virginia on 26 August 1994. The guided-missile cruiser USS Normandy (CG-60) is at right.

History

United States
- Namesake: Benjamin F. Isherwood (1822–1915), an early U.S. Navy engineer and rear admiral
- Awarded: 6 May 1985
- Builder: Pennsylvania Shipbuilding Company, Philadelphia, Pennsylvania, and Tampa Shipbuilding Company, Tampa, Florida
- Laid down: 12 July 1986
- Launched: 15 August 1988^{a} at Pennsylvania Shipbuilding; christened 7 December 1991 at Tampa Shipbuilding
- In service: Never
- Stricken: 29 December 1997
- Identification: IMO number: 8508876
- Fate: Scrapped, 2011
- Notes: Construction contract cancelled 15 August 1993 when ship 95.3% complete

General characteristics
- Class & type: Henry J. Kaiser-class replenishment oiler
- Type: Fleet replenishment oiler
- Tonnage: 31,200 deadweight tons
- Displacement: 9,500 tons light; Full load variously reported as 42,382 tons and as 40,700 long tons (41,353 metric tons)
- Length: 677 ft (206 m)
- Beam: 97 ft 5 in (29.69 m)
- Draft: 35 ft (11 m) maximum
- Installed power: 16,000 hp (11.9 MW) per shaft; 34,442 hp (25.7 MW) sustained total
- Propulsion: Two medium-speed Colt-Pielstick PC4-2/2 10V-570 diesel engines, two shafts, controllable-pitch propellers
- Speed: 20 knots (37 km/h; 23 mph)
- Capacity: 178,000 to 180,000 barrels (28,300 to 28,600 m^{3}) of fuel oil and jet fuel; 7,400 sq ft (690 m^{2}) dry cargo space and eight 20-foot (6.1 m) refrigerated containers with room for 128 pallets
- Complement: 103 (18 civilian officers, 1 U.S. Navy officer, 64 merchant seamen, 20 U.S. Navy enlisted personnel)
- Armament: Peacetime: none; Wartime: probably 2 x 20-mm Phalanx CIWS
- Aircraft carried: None
- Aviation facilities: Helicopter landing platform
- Notes: Five refueling stations; Two dry cargo transfer rigs

USNS Benjamin Isherwood (T-AO-191) was a Henry J. Kaiser class fleet replenishment oiler of the United States Navy. She was never completed.

== Construction ==
Benjamin Isherwood, the fifth Henry J. Kaiser-class ship, was laid down by the Pennsylvania Shipbuilding Company in Philadelphia, Pennsylvania, on 12 July 1986. Her construction encountered numerous problems. Although she was launched on 15 August 1988,^{a} her construction contract with Pennsylvania Shipbuilding was cancelled on 31 August 1989. Along with her unfinished sister ship USNS Henry Eckford (T-AO-192), the incomplete Benjamin Isherwood was towed to the Philadelphia Naval Shipyard in Philadelphia on 27 October 1989 for lay-up.

A new contract to complete Benjamin Isherwood was awarded on 16 November 1989 to the Tampa Shipbuilding Company of Tampa, Florida. She was towed from Philadelphia to Tampa. While under tow on Christmas Eve off of Corolla, North Carolina she encountered a storm and broke loose from the tow, running aground about 5 miles south of Corolla. There was no significant damage and she was towed off the beach a few days later at high tide and continued the trip to Tampa. She was christened there on 7 December 1991. However, construction problems continued, and that contract also was cancelled, on 15 August 1993, when the ship was 95.3 percent complete. Cost overruns had run into the millions of U.S. dollars.

== Reserve ==
The Navy decided that completion of Benjamin Isherwood as an oiler was no longer necessary, and considered converting her into an ammunition ship, but the conversion was found to be cost-prohibitive. Instead, the nearly complete Benjamin Isherwood was turned over to the Maritime Administration and towed up the James River in Virginia, where she was placed in the National Defense Reserve Fleet as part of the United States Navy's James River Reserve Fleet at Lee Hall, Virginia. She was struck from the Navy List on 29 December 1997, and her title was transferred to the Maritime Administration on 1 February 1999. She and Henry Eckford were the only units of the 18-ship Henry J. Kaiser class not completed.

== Scrapping ==
On 12 July 2011, the Benjamin Isherwood departed for Brownsville, Texas, to be recycled by International Shipbreaking Limited.
