= Benjamin F. Isherwood =

United States Navy admiral (1822–1915)

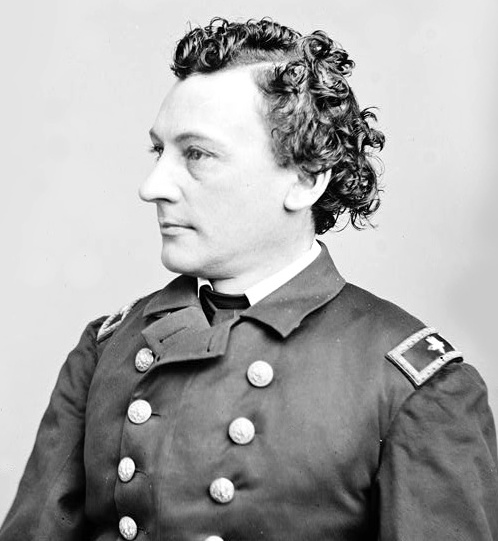
- Isherwood during the American Civil War

Chief of the Bureau of Steam Engineering
- In office March 26, 1861 – March 16, 1869
- Preceded by: Post established
- Succeeded by: James Wilson King

Personal details
- Born: Benjamin Franklin Isherwood; October 6, 1822 New York City, New York, U.S.
- Died: June 19, 1915 (aged 92) New York City, New York, U.S.

Military service
- Allegiance: United States of America
- Branch: United States Navy
- Years of service: 1844–1884
- Rank: Rear Admiral
- Wars: Mexican–American War; American Civil War

Benjamin Franklin Isherwood (October 6, 1822 – June 19, 1915) was an engineering officer in the United States Navy during the early days of steam-powered warships. He served as a ship's engineer during the Mexican–American War, and after the war did experimental work with steam propulsion. Rising to the rank of rear admiral, as Engineer-in-Chief of the Navy during the Civil War, he helped to found the Navy's Bureau of Steam Engineering.

== Career in civilian engineering ==
Isherwood was born in New York City and educated at The Albany Academy. He worked for the Utica and Schenectady Railroad and trained under William C. Young, one of the most prominent engineers of that period. Isherwood then worked on the Croton Aqueduct, followed by an engineering job on the Erie Canal. Designing and constructing lighthouses for the Treasury Department was Isherwood's last employment before joining the Navy.

== Early Naval career ==
At the age of 22, Isherwood was appointed first assistant engineer in the Navy May 23, 1844, serving aboard General Taylor from 1846 to 1847. During the Mexican–American War, he served on the Princeton, and later was senior engineer of the Spitfire.

When the Mexican–American War ended, Isherwood was assigned to the Washington Navy Yard, where he assisted Charles Stuart in designing engines and experiments with steam as a source of power for propelling ships. Throughout the 1850s, Isherwood compiled operational and performance data from steam engines in American and foreign commercial vessels and warships. He used these empirical data to analyze the efficiency of engine types then in use.

In the twelve years between the Mexican–American War and the Civil War, Isherwood published 55 technical and scientific articles on steam engineering and vessel propulsion in the prestigious Journal of the Franklin Institute. In 1859 the engineer published the results of his own original thermodynamic experiments in the two-volume Engineering Precedents for Steam Machinery. Isherwood was the nation's most prolific antebellum technical writer.

Isherwood went to sea during the period between the wars, serving as Chief Engineer of the steam frigate San Jacinto on a cruise of more than three years on the East India Squadron during the Second Opium War. During this cruise he was stricken with dysentery, prompting his return to the United States.

== Civil War ==
Shortly after the outbreak of the Civil War, Isherwood was appointed Engineer-in-Chief of the Navy, and so important were his services considered that the Bureau of Steam Engineering was created under his direction.

When the Civil War began, the Navy had 28 steam vessels, and during the war, the number grew to 600. Isherwood conducted the design and construction of the machinery necessary to accomplish this. He designed ships that were fast enough to pursue the blockade runners. One such ship, the USS Wampanoag, reportedly achieved a speed of more than 17 knots, a record no U.S. naval vessel could surpass for 21 years.

In 1863 and 1865, Isherwood published the first and second volumes of Experimental Researches in Steam Engineering, which were translated into six languages and became a standard engineering text upon which future steam experimentation was based.

== Post-war activities ==
Immediately upon the conclusion of the war, Isherwood was principally involved with organizing a new scientific curriculum for steam engineering at the United States Naval Academy at Annapolis. By 1874, naval engineers refined this curriculum to the point that it served as the model for mechanical engineering education at most American universities.

In 1869 Isherwood ran afoul of former Spitfire shipmate Admiral David Dixon Porter. During the war years Isherwood led a campaign to increase the rank and influence of engineering officers in the navy. Porter opposed this change in the service's class structure. After the presidential inauguration of Ulysses S. Grant, Isherwood's longtime patron, Secretary of the Navy Gideon Welles, could no longer protect him. Admiral Porter banished Isherwood to the Mare Island Navy Yard in San Francisco.

Despite his diminished stature, Isherwood continued to produce technical innovations. In 1870 and 1871, Isherwood conducted experiments that resulted in a propeller that was used by the Navy for the next 27 years.

He was a pioneer in the production of fast cruisers, producing this class against strong opposition. Following a tour of European dockyards, he became president of the Experimental Board under the Bureau of Steam Engineering until his retirement as a commodore on October 6, 1884. He was advanced to rear admiral on the retired list in June 1906.

Isherwood died in New York City at the age of 92.

== Legacy ==
Isherwood was elected an honorary member of the American Society of Mechanical Engineers in 1894, in recognition of his work on steam-powered ships and screw propellers and for his technical publications.

The Navy has recognized Isherwood's contributions in several ways. Isherwood Hall, built in 1905 on the campus of the United States Naval Academy, was the home of the Department of Marine Engineering. It was razed in 1982 to make space for the academy's new Alumni Hall. Isherwood's name lives on as the new hall's Isherwood Entrance.

The Rear Admiral Benjamin F. Isherwood Award is awarded by the Navy to recognize "innovation and expertise in the effective assessment, development, execution, or deployment of technological solutions for operational Fleet needs."

Three U.S. Navy ships – two destroyers named USS Isherwood and the never-finished fleet replenishment oiler USNS Benjamin Isherwood – have been named for him.

According to MIT professor and technology historian Elting E. Morison, Isherwood's work on the Wampanoag in the face of a headwind of bureaucratic inertia and ill-founded skepticism warrants the epithet "heroic," while the approach to sea power that Isherwood advocated anticipated Alfred Thayer Mahan by thirty years. In a 1941 article in the United States Naval Institute's Proceedings, George W. Dyson stated that Isherwood was "possibly the greatest engineer the United States Navy has developed."

The revolutionary engineering program initiated by Isherwood at the U.S. Naval Academy became the template for professional American mechanical engineering education. That basic curriculum designed at Annapolis in the late 1860s and early 1870s still serves as the core of university mechanical engineering pedagogy.

== Selected publications ==
- Engineering Precedents for Steam Machinery; Embracing the Performances of Steamships, Experiments with Propelling Instruments, Condensers, Boilers, Etc., Accompanied by Analysis of the Same, Vol. II. New York: Bailliere Brothers, 1859.
- Experimental Researches in Steam Engineering Vol. I. (Philadelphia: 1863).
- 'Notes on the Steamer Bibb.' Journal of the Franklin Institute Vol. 52 (1851): 250–255.
- 'Investigation of the Comparative Merits of the Perpendicular and Radial Paddlewheels for Sea-Going Vessels.' Journal of the Franklin Institute Vol. 50 (August 1850): 134–139.
- 'Investigation of the Comparative Merits of the Perpendicular and Radial Paddlewheels for Sea-Going Vessels.' Journal of the Franklin Institute Vol. 50 (September 1850): 181–188.
- 'Reply to the Objections of ‘M’ (Published in the October Number, page 260) to a Comparison Between the Radial and Perpendicular Paddle Wheels for Steamers.' Journal of the Franklin Institute Vol. 50 (December 1850): 378–383.
- 'Remarks on Nystrom's Screw Propeller.' Journal of the Franklin Institute Vol. 52 (July 1851): 42–49.
- 'Trial Trip of the U.S. Screw Propeller Steamship of War, San Jacinto.' Journal of the Franklin Institute Vol. 52 (November 1851).
- 'Notes on the Indicator Diagrams from the U.S. War Steamer Spitfire.' Journal of the Franklin Institute Vol. 51 (February 1851).
- 'Notes on the U.S. War Steamer Spitfire.' Journal of the Franklin Institute Vol. 51 (March 1851).
- 'Performance at Sea of the U.S. Steamship Fulton.' Journal of the Franklin Institute Vol. 53 (February 1852).
- 'Remarks on H.B.M. Screw Steam Frigate Arrogant.' Journal of the Franklin Institute Vol. 53 (May 1852).
- 'Performance of the U.S. Screw Steamship San Jacinto, from Norfolk, Va., to Cadiz, Spain, during the month of March, 1852.' Journal of the Franklin Institute Vol. 53 (June 1852): 393–397.
- 'The French Line-of-Battle Screw Steamship Charlemagne.' Journal of the Franklin Institute Vol. 57 (February 1854).
- 'Notes on the Application of Lamb and Sumner's Boilers to the U.S. Steamer Vixen.' Journal of the Franklin Institute Vol. 58 (1854): 267–269.
- 'An Account of some Experiments on a Mixture of Saturated and Surcharged Steam (Wethered's patent) made under the direction of E.K. Collins, Esq.' Journal of the Franklin Institute Vol. 57 (April 1854): 257–267.
- 'An Account of some Comparative Experiments made at the Washington, D.C., Navy Yard, April, 1854, on the ordinary mode of setting Land Boilers, and on the mode patented by Henry F. Baker.' Journal of the Franklin Institute Vol. 58 (September 1854): 193–201 and Vol. 58 (October 1854): 259–269.
- 'Disquisition on the Laws regulating the Slips of Screw Propellers in Function and Form of Dimensions; based on a digest of the Experiments made in 1845 by M. Bourgois, Engineer de Vaisseau, at the French Government Manufactory at Indret.' Journal of the Franklin Institute Vol. 59 (March 1855): 156–163, Vol. 59 (April 1855): 219–231, Vol. 59 (May 1855): 295–304, and Vol. 59 (June 1855): 361–368.

== Sources ==
- Bennett, Frank M., The Steam Navy of the United States: A History of the Growth of the Steam Vessel of War in the U.S. Navy, and of the Naval Engineer Corps. Pittsburgh: W. T. Nicholson Press, 1896.
- Sloan, Edward, Benjamin Franklin Isherwood Naval Engineer: The Years as Engineer in Chief, 1861–69. Annapolis: United States Naval Institute, 1965.
- Index to the Journal of the Franklin Institute for the One Hundred and Twenty Volumes from 1826 to 1885. Philadelphia: Franklin Institute, 1890.
