= USS Argonne (AS-10) =

Tender of the United States Navy

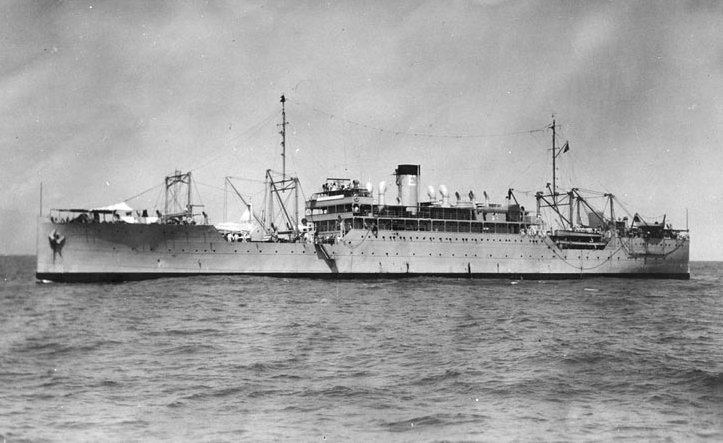
- USS Argonne (AS-10), c. 1930s

History

United States
- Name: Argonne
- Namesake: Meuse-Argonne campaign in World War I
- Builder: American International Shipbuilding
- Yard number: 673
- Laid down: 22 November 1918 as Sinsinawa
- Launched: 24 February 1920
- Completed: August 1920
- Acquired: 5 November 1921
- Commissioned: 8 November 1921
- Decommissioned: 15 July 1946
- Reclassified: From AP-4 to AS-10, 1 July 1924; to AG-31, 25 July 1940
- Stricken: 28 August 1946
- Fate: Sold for scrap, 14 August 1950

General characteristics
- Type: Design 1024 ship
- Displacement: 8,400 tons
- Length: 448 ft (137 m)
- Beam: 68 ft 6 in (20.88 m)
- Draft: 23 ft 9 in (7.24 m)
- Speed: 15.5 knots
- Complement: 249; AG: 398
- Armament: 4 × 5-inch guns; 4 × 3-inch guns; 2 × 6-pounder guns

USS Argonne (AP-4/AS-10/AG-31) was a Design 1024 cargo ship built under United States Shipping Board contract by the International Shipbuilding Corp., Hog Island, Pennsylvania, for the United States Department of War. Named Argonne for the U.S. Army's Meuse-Argonne campaign in World War I, she was completed in 1920, delivered to the War Department in December 1920, laid up in February 1921, and loaned to the Navy on 3 November 1921. Accepted preliminarily by the Navy on that date, she was commissioned as Argonne on 8 November 1921 at the Philadelphia Navy Yard. The ship was permanently transferred to the Navy 6 August 1924 by Executive Order.

== Operational history ==
Argonne was delivered to the War Department assigned to the U.S. Army Transport Service in the early part of 1921 and quickly laid up at Philadelphia in February. The ship was loaned to the Navy on 3 November 1921, commissioned on 8 November as USS Argonne. On 16 November 1921, the ship was classified as a transport, AP-4. Departing Philadelphia on 24 November 1921 with military and civilian passengers, as well as a senatorial party, Argonne's maiden voyage and shakedown took the ship to Port-au-Prince, Haiti; St. Thomas, Virgin Islands; Ponce, Puerto Rico; and Santo Domingo City, Dominican Republic; before she put into Hampton Roads on 22 December. Subsequently, returning to Philadelphia for post-shakedown availability, Argonne proceeded to the Panama Canal via Charleston, South Carolina, and after a stop at Mare Island continued across the Pacific to Cavite, in the Philippines, on her first voyage to that part of the globe.

=== 1922–1929 ===
On 7 April 1922, Commander (later Fleet Admiral) Chester W. Nimitz, along with his wife and three children, embarked on board Argonne at Pearl Harbor for passage to the east coast of the United States. Nimitz was on his way to Newport, Rhode Island, to study at the Naval War College. The ship proceeded via Mare Island, where she underwent an overhaul period. Following that was a transit through the Panama Canal, Santo Domingo and Hampton Roads, bringing her voyage to a close on 21 June 1922.

Over the next two years, Argonne operated with the Naval Transportation Service on the through service between New York and Manila. Along with the transport USS Chaumont, Argonne provided this important service to the fleet. During this time, she ranged from San Francisco to Guam and into the Yellow Sea, voyaging as far as Chefoo, China. Selected for conversion to a submarine tender and classified as AS-10 on 1 July 1924, Argonne was permanently transferred to Navy ownership under terms of the executive order dated 6 August 1924, and arrived at the Mare Island Navy Yard on 2 September 1924.

From September 1924 to March 1926, Argonne lay at Mare Island in reduced commission, undergoing her transformation from transport to tender. Major alternations to the ship included the installation of a turbo-generator plant, a compressed-air plant, a machine shop and a low-pressure distilling plant.

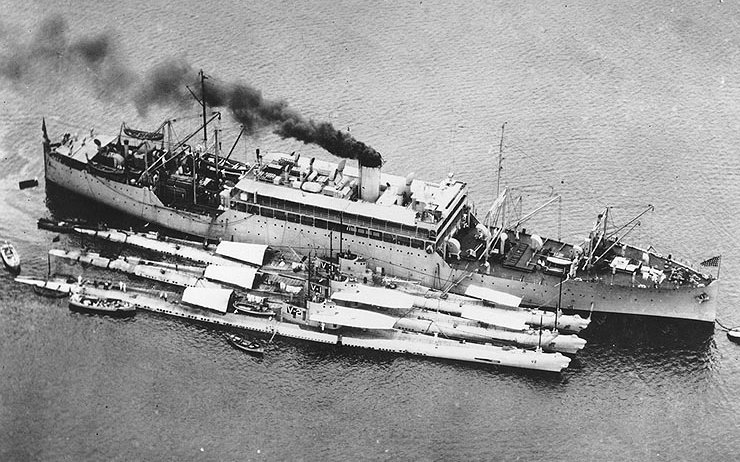
Argonne with Barracuda, Bass, and Bonita, off Panama, late 1920s

Placed in full commission on 25 March 1926, Argonne was assigned to the newly formed Submarine Division (SubDiv) 20, which consisted, at that time, of the "V-boats": V-1; V-2; and V-3. She sailed on 19 May to take up her duties. From 19 May to 5 June, Argonne operated from the west coast ports of San Francisco, San Pedro and San Diego, before she sailed to transit the Panama Canal for operations in the Atlantic.

Owing to disorders in Nicaragua, and fears that excesses of violence from the feuding factions might endanger American lives and property, expeditionary forces of marines were sent to reinforce the sailors and marines already landed from ships of the Special Service Squadron. Argonne participated in one of the early lifts, transporting the second Battalion, 5th Regiment – which had been encamped at Guantánamo Bay undergoing six months of training—from Guantanamo to Bluefields, Nicaragua, between 7 and 10 January 1927.

Maintaining the necessary neutral zones on the east coast for eight days, the battalion left one company at Rama before proceeding on, in Argonne, through the Panama Canal to the port of Corinto, on the west coast of Nicaragua. There, she disembarked the rest of the battalion on 24 January to maintain the neutral zones between that port and the capital city of Managua, before returning thence into the Caribbean to resume tending operations with SubDiv 20.

During March Argonne provided tender services to ships engaged in Fleet Problem VII, in a large-scale exercise that pitted the combined Battle Fleet, Base Force and fleet submarines against the combined Scouting Fleet, Control Force and Train Squadron 1. She rejoined the Special Service Squadron at the end of that month, however, to resume her transportation duties to Nicaraguan ports.

On 1 July 1927, Argonne became part of the Control Force, with which she carried out her previous duties with the Special Service Squadron, until being transferred with SubDiv 20 to the Battle Fleet, on 19 November. She operated with the fleet on the Pacific Coast, principally at San Diego, San Pedro, or Mare Island, until she sailed for Hawaiian waters on 18 April 1928, to take part in Fleet Problem VIII, an exercise that pitted light cruisers and a detachment of ships from Pearl Harbor ("Orange") against the Battle Fleet and the Train ("Blue"). Reaching Pearl Harbor on the 28th, she then based at Lahaina, and carried out tactical exercises with the fleet, ultimately returning to Mare Island for her annual overhaul on 29 June.

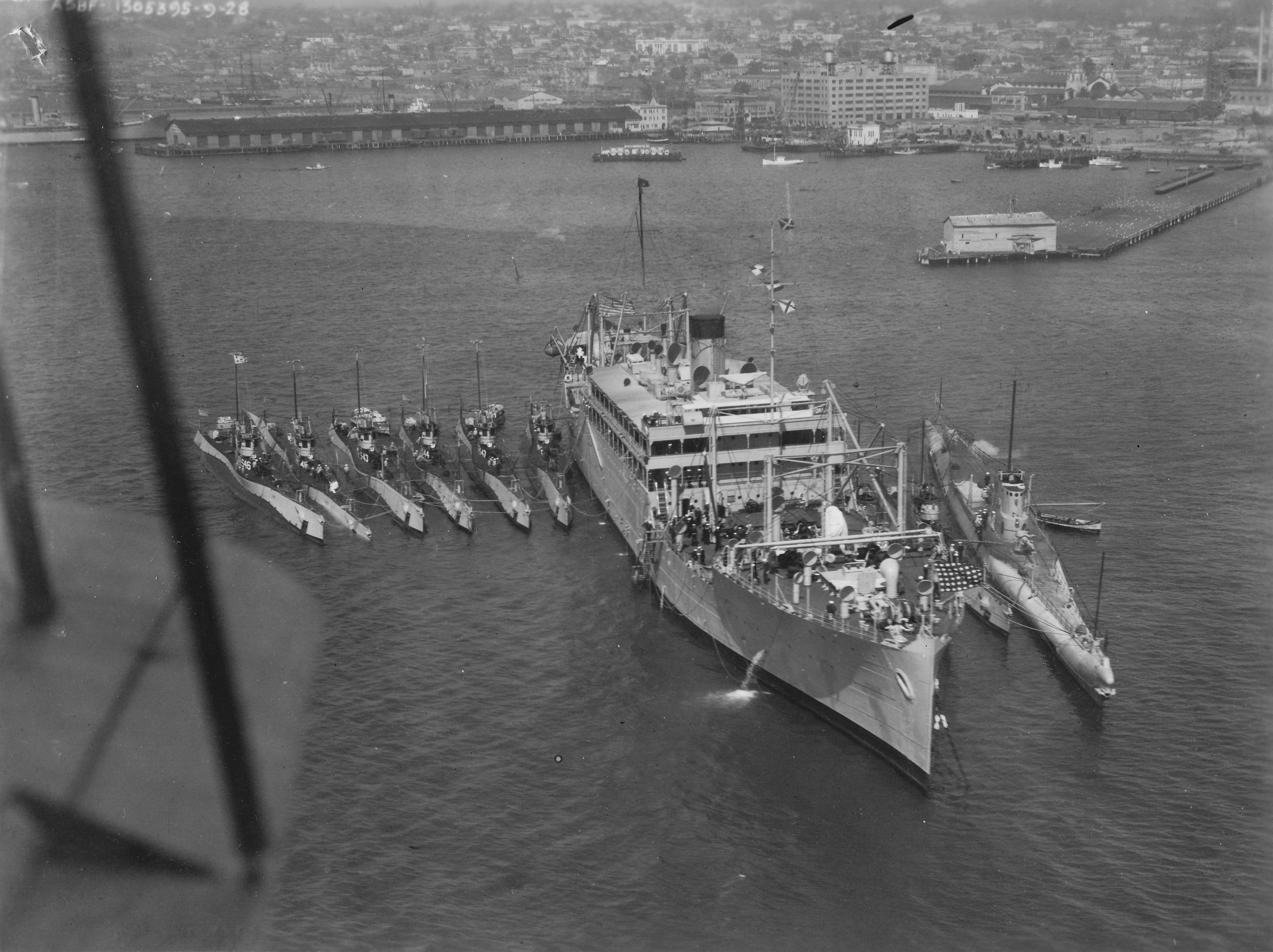
Argonne with seven S-class subs and one V boat in San Diego in late 1928

Resuming her active service with the Battle Fleet in the San Diego-San Pedro area from 18 August 1928, she operated there until 15 January 1929 when she sailed for Balboa, to take part in Fleet Problem IX, with all available units of the Battle Fleet and Train Squadron Two – these in the main opposed by the Scouting Fleet and the Control Force and the defense forces of the 15th Naval District and Army units. Arriving at Balboa on 29 January, the assembled fleet conducted its concentration based on Panama Bay before setting course back to San Diego on 11 March, and ultimately arriving back in their usual operating areas on the 22d.

Over the next eleven months, Argonne provided support services at San Diego with SubDivs 11 and 20, as the ships conducted speed and endurance tests, as well as torpedo and sound exercises. During this period, on 15 June 1929, Capt. Chester W. Nimitz, who had been a passenger on board the ship seven years before, became her commanding officer. His concurrent billet was that of Commander, SubDiv 20, his broad pennant in Argonne.

=== 1930–1939 ===
After overhaul at Mare Island, Argonne tended SubDivs 11 and 20 at San Diego from 11 December 1929 to 15 February 1930 before sailing for Panama on the latter date in company with Destroyer Squadrons, Battle Fleet, for the annual fleet concentration and the year's culmination of training, Fleet Problem X and XI. Each force was augmented to match them more evenly, pitting the Scouting Fleet against the Battle Fleet.

Following the exercises in the Caribbean, Argonne accompanied the fleet as it moved up to New York, arriving there on 7 May 1930. She operated with the fleet at New York, Newport, and Hampton Roads until 26 May, when she then set course for Panama and back to San Diego, arriving at the latter port on 19 June. She continued her tender operations from there until 1 December. During that time, she was transferred to the Control Force, Battle Fleet, on 6 November, on which date she was also transferred from SubDiv 20. Capt. Nimitz shifted his command pennant to USS Holland on 5 November, that ship becoming flagship for SubDiv 20.

Argonne accompanied SubDivs 11 and 19 from San Diego on 1 December 1930, and engaged in maneuvers en route to Pearl Harbor, before she returned immediately to San Diego two days before Christmas with SubDivs 9 and 14. On 6 January 1931, Argonne became flagship for Commander, Fleet Base Force, and steamed from San Pedro that day, to take part in Fleet Problem XII – an evolution opposing the Battle Fleet to the Scouting Fleet, the latter augmented by the rigid airship Los Angeles. Returning to San Pedro on 4 April, she then conducted operations off the west coast, fleet and tactical maneuvers, until she departed San Pedro with the Battle Force on 23 January 1932 for Hawaiian waters.

At Pearl Harbor and Lahaina Roads, Argonne took part in exercises and provided tender support for the fleet as it carried out Fleet Problem XIII between the west coast of the United States and the Hawaiian Island; with the Battle Force once more set against the Scouting Force. Returning to San Pedro on 21 March 1932, she spent the next eleven months providing tender support services and operated with the fleet at San Pedro, San Francisco, and San Pablo, until 8 March 1933.

Argonne sailed from San Pedro on that date, one day after Comdr. Harry A. Badt relieved Comdr. C. R. Hyatt as Argonne's commanding officer and as commanding officer of the Aleutian Islands Surveying Expedition. Reaching the Puget Sound Navy Yard on 13 March, Argonne was drydocked, received stores and equipment, fuel oil and gasoline, and ultimately sailed for Dutch Harbor on 6 April. Proceeding thence to Bay of Islands, Adak, the ship surveyed those waters between 10 and 28 April before she proceeded back to Dutch Harbor with USS Swallow in tow. Argonne remained at Dutch Harbor from 1 to 18 May, contacting USS Patoka at that port for fuel oil and provisions, but also awaiting better weather in which to conduct her surveys. Finally departing Dutch Harbor on 18 May, the ship returned to the survey area – the waters off Adak, in the western Aleutians – on the 20th, remaining in the area for eight days before returning to Dutch Harbor for fuel oil and gasoline. She completed her survey work off Adak from 3 to 16 August before she sailed for Mare Island, and an overhaul, on 25 August.

Argonne, during her time in northern waters, also assisted the Bering Sea Aerological Expedition, with weather surveys and analyses necessary for radio stations of Washington and Alaska.

Remaining as flagship for the Base Force, Argonne provided tender services at San Pedro from 4 October 1933 to 9 April 1934; she then sailed south with the fleet, and supported its operations in Fleet Problem XV, the big war games which again pitted Battle Force against an augmented Scouting Force. In the course of her operations, the ship operated at Balboa, Colon, Culebra, Ponce, Gonaïves and Guantánamo Bay. She then steamed north with the fleet as it called at New York City, arriving on 2 June to be reviewed by President Franklin D. Roosevelt. She subsequently provided tender services out of New London and Newport before she proceeded to Port-au-Prince to participate in the withdrawal of the 1st Marine Brigade from Haiti on 15 August 1934. "Impressive ceremonies on shore amidst most friendly feelings displayed by the populace" accompanied the departure of the marines, whose duties as peacekeepers had been taken over by the fully Haitianized Garde d'Haiti. Other ships involved in the lift included Woodcock, Bridge, and USAT Chateau Thierry.

Following leave and liberty at Hampton Roads and at New Orleans, Argonne joined the fleet, transited the Panama Canal, and ultimately arrived at San Pedro on 9 November 1934. As Base Force flagship, she provided tender and repair services for minesweepers, tugs, and harbor craft, while maintaining the only major photographic laboratory for photo-triangulation of fleet gunnery exercises. Over the next seven years she operated principally out of San Pedro, but followed the fleet to the waters of Hawaii or Panama to carry out her vital support duty.

On 25 July 1940, her classification was changed from submarine tender to "auxiliary, miscellaneous", and she was given the hull number AG-31. Eventually, with the movement of the Fleet to Hawaiian waters over the winter of 1939 and spring of 1940, commencing with the establishment of the Hawaiian Detachment in October 1939 and the permanent retention of the fleet in Hawaiian waters upon the conclusion of Fleet Problem XXI in April 1940, the needs for auxiliaries such as Argonne resulted in a change of scene for that ship. In August 1941, she was shifted from San Pedro to Pearl Harbor.

=== World War II ===
==== Pearl Harbor ====
On the morning of 7 December 1941, Argonne – flagship for Rear Admiral William L. Calhoun, Commander, Base Force, Pacific Fleet – was berthed in the first repair slip at the north end of 1010 dock, with the minesweeper Tern alongside, when aircraft from six Japanese carriers struck the Pacific Fleet as it lay at Pearl Harbor, and neutralized surrounding air and military installations. The ship manned her antiaircraft battery – 3-inch guns and .50-caliber machine guns – and commenced fire about 07:58, shortly after the raid began.

Argonne's crew, wrote Comdr. F. W. O'Connor, the ship's commanding officer, "performed their duties in accordance with the best traditions of the service", helping to get wounded men from damaged ships, recovering bodies from the water, and "assisting with repair facilities to full capacity." Early in the raid, Corporal Alfred Schlag, USMC, from the ship's marine detachment, manning a .50-caliber machine gun, claimed shooting down an enemy plane as it flew over 1010 dock and turned toward Ford Island.

A member of Argonne's crew was attacked before his ship was; Motor Machinist's Mate 2d Class M. F. Poston was taking flying lessons. Returning from Haleiwa to the KT Flying Service field, flying a light training plane, Poston and Bob Tice, the latter the owner of the flying service (who was flying an accompanying plane) were both attacked by Japanese planes which shot them down. The one attacking Poston's light sport plane shot away the propeller and engine, forcing the Argonne sailor to take to his parachute.

That evening, six fighters from the carrier Enterprise, sent to land at the Naval Air Station at Pearl Harbor after accompanying a strike group looking for the carriers from which the Japanese raid had been launched, arrived over Pearl. Tragically, before the planes' friendly character could be established, understandably jittery gunners shot down four of the six planes; three pilots were killed. One .50-caliber bullet fired from the direction of Ford Island penetrated Argonne's port side, killing Seaman Second Class Pallas F. Brown and wounding Seaman 1st Class Leonard A. Price. Both men had survived the loss of their ship, Utah, earlier that morning.

Argonne remained at Pearl Harbor into the spring, serving as flagship for the Base Force until Rear Admiral Calhoun moved his flag ashore, to a headquarters at the Pearl Harbor Navy Yard. That spring, the troopship President Taylor, while on a voyage to Canton Island, ran aground there. After loading salvage equipment, light trucks, medical supplies and ammunition, Argonne stood out of Pearl Harbor on 6 April 1942 for Canton, escorted by the fast minelayer Breese, and arrived at her destination on 12 April. She soon sent a salvage party and equipment to attempt salvage of the grounded troopship.

Accompanied by Breese and the fleet tug Navajo, Argonne cleared Canton on 5 May for Pearl Harbor, and arrived on the 11th. She remained there until 10 July, when, with general cargo on board, she sailed on her second voyage to Canton Island, accompanied this time by Southard and Hovey, and arrived at her destination on the 16th, unloading cargo the same day. Sailing on the 17th, Argonne put into Suva Harbor, Fiji Islands, on the 21st, to unload cargo, and then, two days later, set course for Nouméa, New Caledonia, in company with Hovey, arriving on 27 July 1942.

==== Flagship ====
On the morning of 1 August 1942, Vice Admiral Robert Lee Ghormley broke his flag on board Argonne, having shifted his headquarters from Auckland, New Zealand, as Commander, South Pacific Force and South Pacific Area. Operation Watchtower, the invasion of Guadalcanal, began six days later, on 7 August. The direction of the course of the operation, however, appeared to require an infusion of new blood and a more aggressive commander. This soon came, in the form of Vice Admiral William F. Halsey, Jr., who arrived at Nouméa on 18 October 1942 and was informed, upon arrival, that he was to relieve Vice Admiral Ghormley. Halsey assumed command on board Argonne the same day. Two days later, too early in this billet to journey to Guadalcanal to get a personal look at the situation there, Halsey convened a conference on board Argonne at Nouméa; among those present were Rear Admiral Richmond K. Turner, commanding the Amphibious Forces, Pacific, and Major General Alexander A. Vandegrift, Commanding the 1st Marine Division on Guadalcanal.

Also present were Lieutenant General Thomas Holcomb, the Commandant of the Marine Corps, who by happenstance was in Nouméa on an inspection tour of the area, and Army Major Generals Alexander M. Patch and Millard F. Harmon. After a lengthy discussion of the situation on Guadalcanal, Halsey asked those present if the Americans should evacuate or hold; when told by Vandegrift that he would hold – if he got more support – Halsey told the 1st Marine Division's commander, "All right. Go on back. I'll promise you everything I've got." Guadalcanal would be held.

Halsey exercised command of the theater from Argonne until he shifted his flag ashore, the ship proving "hopelessly inadequate" for the increase in the number of people required on the staff. Argonne was not only overcrowded, but possessed no air conditioning system.

==== New Zealand and Solomons ====
Argonne remained at Nouméa until 16 June 1943, when she sailed for Auckland, arriving at that port on 21 June. She proceeded thence on 27 July for Espiritu Santo, in the New Hebrides, and arrived there, accompanied by HMNZS Inchkeith, on 11 August. After embarking men from Carrier Aircraft Service Unit (CASU) 14, Argonne sailed for the Solomons the same day (11 August), reaching Purvis Bay, off Florida Island, on the 13th. While moored at Purvis Bay, the ship conducted repairs to the destroyer Selfridge, which had been damaged in an engagement with Japanese destroyers off Vella LaVella on the night of 6 October.

Sailing from Purvis Bay on 1 November 1943 in company with SS Coutant and escorted by the Royal New Zealand Navy corvette HMNZS Kiwi, Argonne arrived at Tillotson Cove, Russell Islands, the same day. The ship remained in the Russells, carrying out repair and salvage work, until 27 April 1944, when she stood put for Majuro Atoll in the Marshall Islands.

==== Admiralty Islands ====
Assigned to Service Squadron (ServRon) 10, Argonne provided vital service to the fleet at Majuro until 21 August, when she sailed for Manus, in the Admiralty Islands, a base for the operation to secure the Western Carolines. On board Argonne was Capt. S. B. Ogden, designated as Representative "A" of Commander, ServRon 10, who established his mobile base at Seeadler Harbor upon arrival at Manus on 27 August. From on board Argonne, Capt. Ogden administered the activities of the ServRon 10 detachment as it rendered key logistics support.

At 0850, local time, on 10 November 1944, Argonne lay moored to a buoy in berth 14, Seeadler Harbor, when the ammunition ship Mount Hood blew up, 1,100 yards (1,000 m) away. "At the time of the explosion", wrote Argonne's captain, Comdr. T. H. Escott, "I was standing outside my cabin ... in conversation with the executive officer. By the time we had recovered our stance from the force of the explosion, and faced outboard, the area in the vicinity of berth 380 (where Mount Hood had lain moored) was completely shrouded in a pall of dense black smoke. It was not possible to see anything worth reporting. A second or so thereafter, fragments of steel and shrapnel began falling on and around this ship."

Some 221 pieces of debris, ranging in size from 1 to 150 pounds (0.45 to 68.04 kg), were recovered on board, totaling 1,300 lb (590 kg). Several other pieces caromed off Argonne's port side into the water alongside, and others landed on YF-681 and YO-77, the latter alongside delivering fuel oil at the time. The repair ship Mindanao, suffered heavily, moored in a berth between the disintegrating ammunition ship and Argonne. Argonne suffered casualties as well as the destruction of a 12-inch (300 mm) searchlight, five transmitting antennas broken away, and steam, fresh-water and salt-water lines ruptured, as well as extensive damage from concussion.

==== Kossol Passage ====
After repairs and a resumption of work at Manus, Argonne sailed for Kossol Passage, in the Palaus, arriving there on 15 December 1944. While anchored in berth 74, Kossol Roads, the ship again suffered damage at the hands of friendly ships. YMS-275 lay alongside to the port side, aft; YMS-38 and SC-702 to the port side, forward. An LCVP, attempting to tie up alongside the subchaser, accidentally fouled its ramp in the depth charge rack of SC-702, wrenching loose a 300-pound depth charge. The explosion of the sinking charge lifted Argonne bodily "several inches", and jarred two additional charges loose from SC-702's track—which, fortunately, did not explode. Damage to Argonne was confined mostly to the forward portion of the ship, in the print shop, radio-repair shop, and galleys and pantries, as loose gear came crashing to the deck. After again repairing her own damage, the ship resumed her important service to the fleet, and remained in the Palaus until she sailed for the Philippines on 11 February 1945 to take up support operations for the Okinawa campaign, basing on Leyte.

Arriving at her new base of operations on 15 February, Argonne operated out of Leyte into June. She weighed anchor on the 14th of that month and sailed for the Marshalls on that date.

Argonne remained in the western Pacific through the end of hostilities with Japan in August 1945, and briefly served with the occupation forces in Japanese waters before returning to the United States.

=== Postwar ===
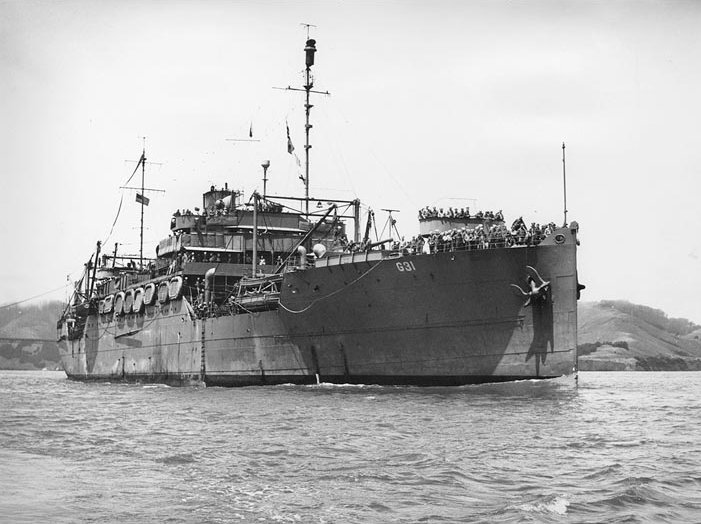
With returning servicemen in San Francisco Bay, late 1945/early 1946

Ultimately returning to the United States after a brief stint with the Naval Transportation Service on Operation Magic Carpet service after the war, Argonne was decommissioned at Mare Island Naval Shipyard on 15 July 1946.

Deemed not essential to the United States, she was transferred to the United States Maritime Commission on 31 July 1946. Argonne was struck from the Naval Vessel Register on 28 August 1946. Ultimately, the ship was sold to the Boston Metals Corp. on 14 August 1950, and was broken up for scrap.

== Honors and awards ==
- Asiatic-Pacific Campaign Medal with one battle star
- World War II Victory Medal
- Navy Occupation Service Medal with Asia Clasp

Argonne (AG-31) was awarded one battle star for her World War II service, for her service during the attack on Pearl Harbor.
