= USS Holland (AS-3) =

Tender of the United States Navy

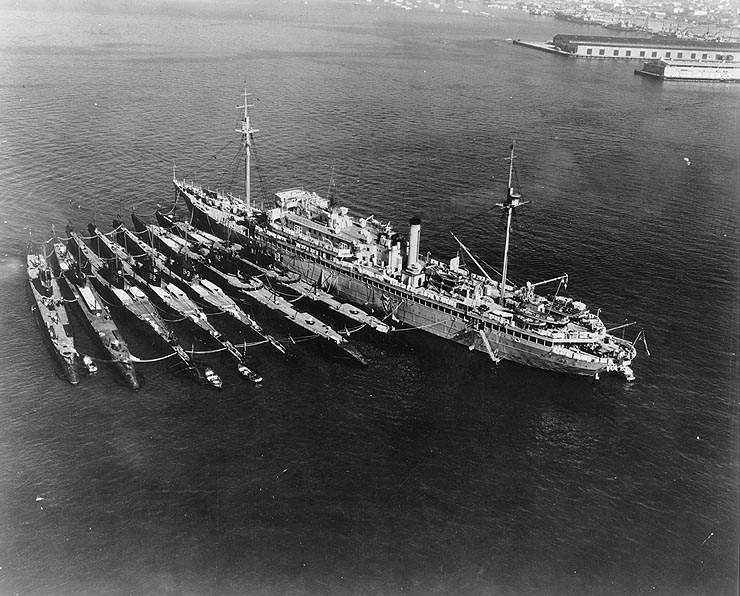
- Seven V-boats (left to right: Cachalot, Dolphin, Barracuda, Bass, Bonita, Nautilus, Narwhal), with submarine tender Holland at San Diego in December 1934

History

United States
- Name: USS Holland
- Builder: Puget Sound Naval Shipyard, Bremerton, Washington
- Launched: 12 April 1926
- Decommissioned: 21 March 1947
- Reclassified: ARG-18, 30 August 1945
- Stricken: 18 June 1952
- Honors and awards: 2 battle stars and Navy Unit Commendation (World War II)
- Fate: Sold for scrap, 3 October 1953

General characteristics
- Type: Submarine tender
- Displacement: 8,100 long tons (8,230 t) standard; 11,570 long tons (11,756 t) (full load)
- Length: 483 ft 8 in (147.42 m)
- Beam: 61 ft 1 in (18.62 m)
- Draft: 16 ft 9 in (5.11 m)
- Installed power: 7,000 shp (5,220 kW)
- Propulsion: 2 × steam turbines; 2 × shafts
- Speed: 16 kn (30 km/h; 18 mph)
- Complement: 388
- Armament: 8 × 5"/38 caliber guns; 4 × 3"/50 caliber guns; 1 21" torpedo tube

USS Holland (AS-3) was a submarine tender that served in the United States Navy before and during World War II. Holland was launched by the Puget Sound Naval Shipyard, Bremerton, Washington on 12 April 1926, sponsored by Miss Elizabeth Saunders Chase, daughter of Admiral J. V. Chase, and commissioned on 1 June. Stationed at San Diego, California, tending submarine divisions there with periodic tours to Panama to service submarines based at the Canal Zone pre-World War two. Later serving in the Pacific theatre, by close of hostilities having given 55 instances of refit to submarines, provided repair and service to 20 surface craft and completed various jobs on shore installations.

She shifted to San Pedro Submarine Base, for inactivation overhaul in the Terminal Island Navy Yard, then was towed to San Diego where she was decommissioned on 21 March 1947. She was assigned to the San Diego, California, group of the Pacific Reserve Fleet until her name was struck from the Navy Register on 18 June 1952. Her hull was sold for scrapping on 3 October 1953 to the Bethlehem Steel Corporation.

== Service history ==
=== Pre-World War II ===
Holland arrived in San Francisco from Puget Sound on 24 April to become flagship of Captain J. T. Thompkins, Commander Submarine Divisions, Battle Fleet. On 24 September, she was permanently assigned to base at San Diego, California, tending submarine divisions there with periodic tours to Panama to service submarines based at the Canal Zone.

On 5 November 1930, Holland became flagship of Captain Chester W. Nimitz, Commander Submarine Divisions, Battle Fleet with additional duty as Commander of Submarine Division 20. The former command was abolished as of 1 April 1931 and Captain Nimitz retained his flag in Holland as Commander, of his submarine division, now designated Submarine Division 12. He left Holland on 17 June, relieved by Captain Wilhelm L. Friedell.

In addition to being the flagship of Submarine Division 12, Holland temporarily served as Submarine Force Flagship (March–July 1933). In June 1935, she became joint flagship of Submarine Squadron 6 and Submarine Division 12. This duty continued until June 1941 when she became flagship of Submarine Squadron 2.

=== World War II ===
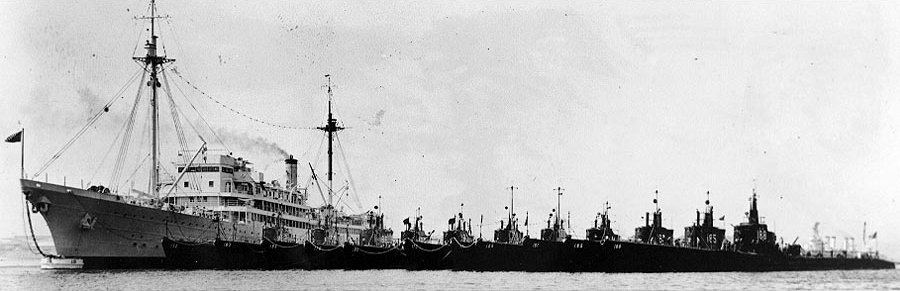
Holland in San Diego Bay in 1940 with submarines Salmon, Seal, Stingray, Perch, Pollack, Cachalot, Cuttlefish, Skipjack, Sturgeon, Snapper and Sargo

On 22 November 1941, Holland arrived at Cavite Naval Base, Philippines, to service submarines of the Asiatic Fleet. Due to the air raids in early December 1941, Holland was hurried out of Manila Bay under cover of night with her vital cargo of repair and replacement parts for submarines of the Asiatic Fleet. Heading south, she escaped unscathed from two air raids while at Balikpapan, Borneo, then repaired a battle-damaged submarine at Surabaya, Java where she was joined by two destroyers that gave her escort to Port Darwin, Australia, which she reached on 2 January 1942 for round-the-clock operations which included the building of docks and floats as well as the constant repair and equipping of ships as well as submarines. On 3 February, Captain C.Q. Wright took command and she was underway for Cilacap, Southern Java, to remove Rear Admiral Charles A. Lockwood Jr., and his Asiatic Fleet Submarine Force Staff to Australia. Her outstanding service to the Fleet during the first crucial months of the war brought Holland a Navy Unit Commendation.

While based in Australia, under the command of Captain C.Q. Wright, Holland serviced and overhauled several submarines before returning for overhaul at Mare Island Navy Yard in late February 1943. She reached Pearl Harbor from the West Coast in June and completed 22 refits and 13 repair jobs for submarines within the next 11 months. She shifted to Midway Atoll on 1 June 1944 and sailed the following month directly to support submarines in the Mariana Islands. Holland returned to Pearl Harbor late in November 1944, to be fitted out as headquarters ship for Vice Admiral Charles A. Lockwood Jr., Commander Submarine Force, Pacific Fleet. In January 1945, she steamed out of Pearl Harbor for Guam where she embarked Vice Admiral Lockwood. By the close of hostilities, Holland had given 55 instances of refit to submarines, provided repair and service to 20 surface craft and completed various jobs on shore installations.

=== Post-war ===
Vice Admiral Lockwood shifted his Submarine Force Flag ashore to his new quarters on Coconut Island off Guam on 30 August 1945, setting up operations and communications for the work ahead. This left Holland ready to begin a new career as an internal combustion engine repair ship ARG-18. Her value to the submarine force had diminished with the commissioning of many new and modern tenders better equipped to carry on the job of keeping submarines in condition for their assaults against the enemy. With a few alterations, she headed for Buckner Bay, Okinawa, where she embarked Rear Admiral Allen B. Smith, Commander of Service Squadron 10 and his staff before proceeding for Tokyo Bay where she dropped anchor on 29 September 1945.

Holland set course 6 June 1946 by way of Pearl Harbor for San Diego where she arrived on 28 June. She shifted to San Pedro for inactivation overhaul in the Terminal Island Navy Yard, then was towed to San Diego where she was decommissioned on 21 March 1947. She was assigned to the San Diego, California, group of the Pacific Reserve Fleet until her name was struck from the Navy Register on 18 June 1952. Her hull was sold for scrapping on 3 October 1953 to the Bethlehem Steel Corporation.

== Awards ==
- Navy Unit Commendation
- American Defense Service Medal with "FLEET" clasp
- Asiatic Pacific Campaign Medal with two battle stars
- World War II Victory Medal
- Navy Occupation Medal
