= USS Barracuda (SS-163) =

Submarine of the United States

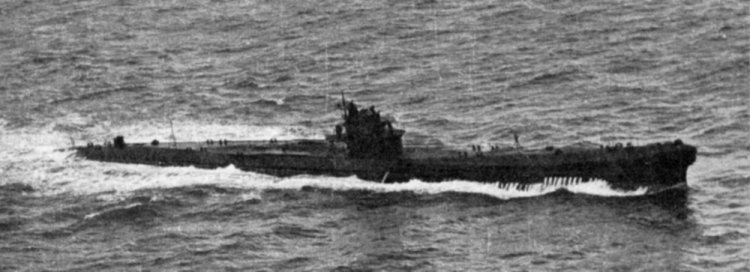
- USS Barracuda (SS-163)

History

United States
- Builder: Portsmouth Naval Shipyard, Kittery, Maine
- Laid down: 20 October 1921
- Launched: 17 July 1924
- Commissioned: 1 October 1924
- Decommissioned: 14 May 1937
- Commissioned: 5 September 1940
- Decommissioned: 3 March 1945
- Stricken: 10 March 1945
- Fate: Sold for breaking up, 16 November 1945

General characteristics
- Class & type: V-boat V-1 composite direct-drive diesel and diesel-electric submarine
- Displacement: 2,119 tons (2,153 t) surfaced; 2,506 tons (2,546 t) submerged
- Length: 341 ft 6 in (104.09 m)
- Beam: 27 feet 6 5/8 inches (8.398 m)
- Draft: 15 ft 2 in (4.62 m)
- Propulsion: (as built) 2 × Busch-Sulzer direct-drive main diesel engines, 2,250 hp (1,680 kW) each; 2 × Busch-Sulzer auxiliary diesel engines, 1,000 hp (750 kW) each, diesel-electric drive; Auxiliary engines replaced with BuEng MAN engines 1940, main engines removed 1942-43 on conversion to a cargo submarine; 2 × 60-cell Exide batteries; 2 × Elliott electric motors, 1,200 hp (890 kW) each; 2 shafts
- Speed: 21 knots (39 km/h) surfaced; 9 knots (17 km/h) submerged
- Range: 6,000 nautical miles (11,000 km) at 11 knots (20 km/h); 11,000 nautical miles (20,000 km) at 11 knots with fuel in main ballast tanks
- Endurance: 10 hours at 5 knots (9 km/h)
- Test depth: 200 ft (60 m)
- Complement: 7 officers, 11 petty officers, 69 enlisted
- Armament: 6 × 21-inch (530 mm) torpedo tubes; (four forward, two aft, twelve torpedoes); 1 × 5 inch (127 mm)/51 caliber deck gun

USS Barracuda (SF-4/SS-163), lead ship of her class and first of the "V-boats," was the second ship of the United States Navy to be named for the barracuda (after USS F-2).

== Construction and commissioning ==
Barracuda′s keel was laid down at Portsmouth Navy Yard. She was launched as V-1 (SF-4) on 17 July 1924, sponsored by Mrs. Cornelia Wolcott Snyder, wife of Captain Snyder, and commissioned on 1 October 1924. V-1 and her sisters V-2 (Bass) and V-3 (Bonita) were the only class of the nine "V-boats" designed to meet the fleet submarine requirement of 21 knots (39 km/h) surface speed for operating with contemporary battleships.

== Engineering ==
V-1 was completed with two Busch-Sulzer direct-drive 6-cylinder 2-cycle main diesel engines of 2,250 hp (1,680 kW) each, along with two Busch-Sulzer auxiliary diesel engines of 1,000 hp (750 kW) each, driving electrical generators. The latter were primarily for charging batteries, but to reach maximum surfaced speed, they could augment the mechanically coupled main-propulsion engines by supplying supplemental power to the 1,200 hp (890 kW) electric motors that were intended for submerged propulsion. Although it wasn't until about 1939 that its problems were fully solved, electric transmission in a pure diesel-electric arrangement became the propulsion system for the successful fleet submarines of World War II, the Porpoise-class, and the Tambor-class through the Tench-class. Prior to recommissioning in 1940, the auxiliary diesels were replaced with two BuEng Maschinenfabrik Augsburg Nürnberg AG (MAN-designed) 6-cylinder 4-cycle diesel engines of 1,000 hp (750 kW) each. In 1942-43 Barracuda was converted to a cargo submarine, with the main engines removed to provide cargo space, significantly reducing her speed on the remaining auxiliary diesels.

The conversion failed to make the submarines effective cargo carriers. On 6 August 1943 in a message with the date-time of 06 1945 Admiral Nimitz proposed the three converted submarines be used to support Philippines guerilla operations to free fleet boats doing so for their primary mission of shipping destruction. The next day Admiral King in 07 1538 COMINCH to CINCPAC directed Admiral Nimitz's "personal opinion" of such use with respect to their auxiliary engines "not improved with age," their slow diving time had not improved and that "oil leaks are as abundant as always." By message 11 0631 CINCPAC to COMINCH Nimitz noted he thought the conversion had been done to make them effective for the proposed purpose but in light of a remedy of those deficiencies being a diversion of needed resources for new construction "I regretfully withdraw suggestion in my 061945."

== Construction ==
V-1 had been commissioned in 1924 for surface running only, to permit an early trial of her engines. She was assigned to Submarine Division 20 and, after cruising along the New England coast, sailed on 14 January 1925 on a surface cruise of the Caribbean Sea, returning in May 1925 for completion. V-1 cruised along the Atlantic coast and in the Caribbean until November 1927.

== Operational life ==
On 8 November 1927 Squadron 20 left Portsmouth, New Hampshire, for San Diego, California, arriving 3 December. Between December 1927 and May 1932 V-1 served with the Squadron on routine operations with the fleet along the west coast, in the Hawaiian Islands, and in the Caribbean. During this period her 5 inch (127 mm)/51 caliber deck gun was replaced by a 3 inch (76 mm)/50 caliber weapon. Her name was changed to Barracuda 9 March 1931 (for the scrapped F-2) and her hull classification symbol to SS-163, 1 July 1931. In May 1932 she went into Rotating Reserve with Submarine Division 15 at Mare Island Naval Shipyard. In January 1933 Barracuda was assigned to Submarine Division 12 and, until late in 1936, operated along the west coast and cruised to Pearl Harbor and the Panama Canal Zone with the fleet. On 28 October 1936 she left San Diego for the Caribbean where she took part in the Gravimetric Survey Expedition. On 8 January 1937 Barracuda sailed from St. Thomas, Virgin Islands, and arrived at Philadelphia, Pennsylvania, on 14 January, where she remained until placed out of commission 14 May 1937.

== Recommissioning ==
Barracuda was recommissioned at Portsmouth, New Hampshire, on 5 September 1940 and assigned to Submarine Division 9. She sailed from Portsmouth 2 March 1941 to Bermuda, returning in June to join Submarine Division 71. She remained in the New England area until sailing from New London, Connecticut, on 17 November 1941 to join the Pacific Fleet. She attended to duty in the Pacific Patrol Area until 15 December 1941 when she rejoined the Atlantic Fleet. Between 15 December 1941 and 7 September 1942 Barracuda was attached to Submarine Division 31 and completed six war patrols in the Pacific Ocean, southwest of Panama, without enemy contacts.

Barracuda returned to Coco Solo, Canal Zone, on 7 September 1942 and, following voyage repairs, she proceeded to Philadelphia, Pennsylvania, for overhaul. At this time she was converted to a cargo submarine with the removal of her main engines, severely restricting her speed on the auxiliary engines. Following overhaul she was based at New London until February 1945 with Submarine Divisions 13 and 31. She operated on training problems with destroyers, other submarines, and planes in Block Island Sound. Barracuda arrived at Philadelphia Navy Yard on 16 February 1945; was decommissioned 3 March 1945; and sold 16 November 1945.

== Awards ==
- American Defense Service Medal with "FLEET" clasp
- American Campaign Medal
- Asiatic-Pacific Campaign Medal
- World War II Victory Medal
