= USS Dolphin (SS-169) =

"V-boat" class submarine

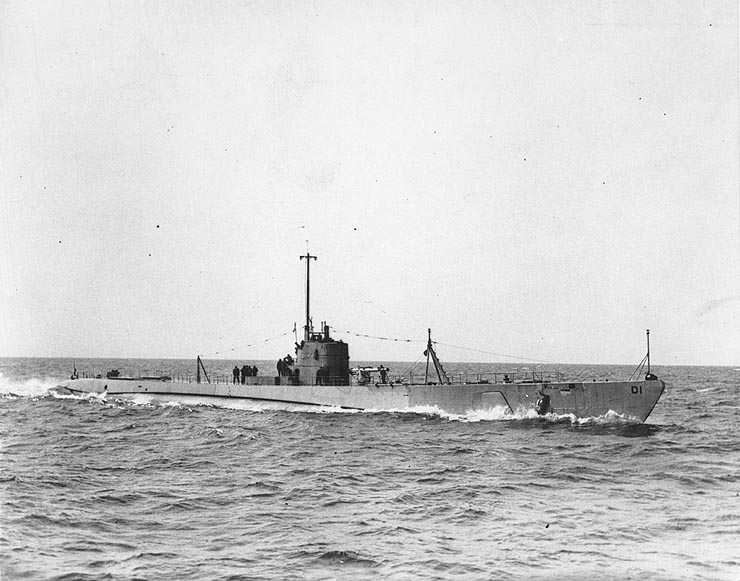
- USS Dolphin underway on the surface.

Class overview
- Name: Dolphin -class submarine
- Preceded by: Narwhal class
- Succeeded by: Cachalot class

History

United States
- Name: USS Dolphin
- Namesake: Dolphin
- Builder: Portsmouth Naval Shipyard, Kittery, Maine
- Laid down: 14 June 1930
- Launched: 6 March 1932
- Commissioned: 1 June 1932
- Decommissioned: 2 October 1945
- Stricken: 24 October 1945
- Honors and awards: 2 × battle stars
- Fate: Sold for breaking up, 26 August 1946

General characteristics
- Class & type: V-7 (Dolphin)-class composite direct-drive diesel and diesel-electric submarine
- Displacement: Surfaced: 1,718 long tons (1,746 t); Submerged: 2,240 long tons (2,276 t)
- Length: 319 ft 3 in (97.31 m)
- Beam: 27 ft 11 in (8.51 m)
- Propulsion: 2 × BuEng-built, MAN-designed direct-drive main diesel engines, 1,750 hp (1,300 kW) each, 2 BuEng MAN auxiliary diesel engines, 450 hp (340 kW) each, driving 300 kW (400 hp) electrical generators; 2 × 120-cell batteries; 2 × Electro-Dynamic electric motors; 2 shafts
- Speed: 17 knots (31 km/h; 20 mph) surfaced, 8 kn (9.2 mph; 15 km/h) submerged; 8.7 kn (10.0 mph; 16.1 km/h) submerged, service, 1939
- Range: 4,900 nmi (9,100 km; 5,600 mi) at 10 kn (19 km/h; 12 mph), 18,780 nmi (21,610 mi; 34,780 km) at 10 kn with fuel in main ballast tanks
- Endurance: 10 hours at 5 kn (5.8 mph; 9.3 km/h)
- Test depth: 250 ft (76 m)
- Complement: 7 officers, 56 enlisted
- Armament: 6 × 21 inch (533 mm) torpedo tubes (four forward, two aft), 18 torpedoes, 1 × 4 inch (102 mm)/50 caliber deck gun

USS Dolphin (SF-10/SC-3/SS-169), a submarine and one of the "V-boats", was the sixth ship of the United States Navy to be named for that aquatic mammal. She also bore the name V-7 and the classifications SF-10 and SC-3 prior to her commissioning. She was launched on 6 March 1932 by the Portsmouth Navy Yard, sponsored by Mrs. E.D. Toland, and commissioned on 1 June 1932.

== Design ==
Dolphin was the penultimate design in the V-boat series. With a length of 319 ft (97 m) and a displacement only a little more than half that of the previous three large cruiser submarines (1,718 long tons (1,746 t) surfaced, 2,240 long tons (2,276 t) submerged), Dolphin was clearly an attempt to strike a medium between those latter submarines and earlier S-class submarines, which were little more than large coastal boats. The general arrangement of propulsion machinery was identical to that of V-5 and V-6, but even with a surface displacement of only 1,718 tons, Dolphin's scaled-down main engines—rated at 1,750 hp (1,300 kW) each—could only just deliver the surface speed of the larger ships, and her endurance and torpedo load-out were much reduced. The torpedo armament was six 21-inch (530 mm) tubes (4 bow, 2 stern), with 18 torpedoes. A 4-inch (102 mm)/50 caliber deck gun was equipped. Dolphin's size and weight were nearly ideal for the range and duration of the war patrols that became customary in the Pacific during World War II, and the war-time Gato, Balao, and Tench classes had similar dimensions.

The engine specifications were two BuEng-built, MAN-designed direct-drive 6-cylinder 4-stroke diesel engines, 1,750 hp (1,300 kW) each, with two BuEng MAN 4-cycle 6-cylinder auxiliary diesel engines, 450 hp (340 kW) each, driving 300 kW (400 hp) electrical generators. The auxiliary engines were for charging batteries or for increased surface speed via a diesel-electric system providing power to the main electric motors. Unusually for the V-boats, Dolphin's engines were never replaced.

Dolphin was built to a partial welded/partial riveted construction method. The Portsmouth Navy Yard expanded the use of welding with this boat, and in addition to the superstructure, piping brackets, and various support frames, the Portsmouth engineers used welding on the outer hull flanges to the Kingston valves and on interior tanks in the forward and aft torpedo rooms. Adopting a cautious, economically driven approach they still riveted both the inner and outer hulls. The designer of the Dolphin, Andrew McKee, was concerned about weight growth and so he made the decision to trim off a portion of the standing flange on the I-beams used in hull construction, leaving them looking somewhat like the number 1. He later admitted that this was not the best idea, as it adversely affected hull strength.

== Service history ==
=== Inter-war period ===
Dolphin departed Portsmouth, New Hampshire on 24 October 1932 for San Diego, California, arriving on 3 December to report to Submarine Division 12 (SubDiv 12). She served on the West Coast, taking part in tactical exercises and test torpedo firings until 4 March 1933, when she got underway for the East Coast. She arrived at Portsmouth Navy Yard on 23 March for final trials and acceptance, remaining there until 1 August. Dolphin returned to San Diego on 25 August 1933 to rejoin SubDiv 12.

In 1933, Dolphin tested an unusual feature for submarines of having a waterproof motor boat, stored in a compartment aft of the sail, which could be brought out when needed. At that time, most navies adhered to the prize rules, which required submarines to board and inspect merchant vessels before they could sink them, as had often been done in World War I, except in periods of unrestricted submarine warfare.

She cruised on the west coast with occasional voyages to Pearl Harbor, Alaska, and the Panama Canal Zone for exercises and fleet problems. On 1 December 1937, Dolphin departed San Diego for her new homeport, Pearl Harbor, arriving one week later. She continued to operate in fleet problems and training exercises, visiting the West Coast on a cruise from 29 September to 25 October 1940. Located at Pearl Harbor on 7 December 1941, Dolphin took the attacking enemy planes under fire, and then left for a patrol in search of Japanese submarines in the Hawaiian Islands.

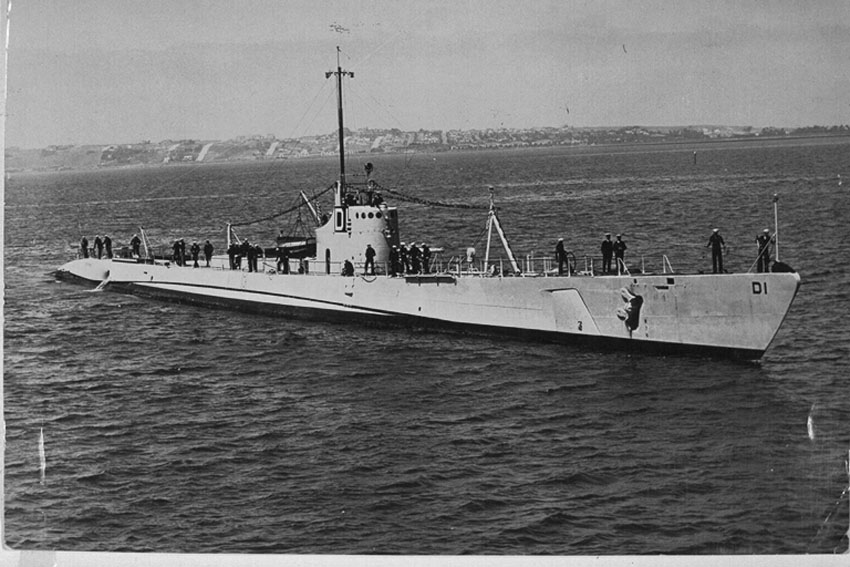
Dolphin at the Underwater Sound School, Hawaii, circa 1940. Note motor boat aft of the sail.

=== World War II ===
Dolphin departed from Pearl Harbor on 24 December 1941 on her first war patrol, during which she reconnoitered in the Marshall Islands in preparation for later air strikes.

She returned to Pearl Harbor on 3 February 1942 to refit and resupply, and then got underway once more on 14 May. Searching a wide area west of Midway Island, she patrolled off the island itself during the pivotal Battle of Midway from 3 to 6 June. She put in to the atoll for repairs from 8 to 11 June, and then she returned to her patrol, attacking a destroyer and a tanker with undetermined results before returning to Pearl Harbor on 24 July.

Her third war patrol, from 12 October to 5 December, was in the storm-tossed waters of the Kurile Islands, where she performed reconnaissance essential to the operations that were to keep Japanese bases there largely ineffective throughout the war.

By 1943 Dolphin was thoroughly worn out and badly in need of a modernization. Her age and basic limitations argued against the time-consuming and costly work, so for most of 1943 she was used in training operations at Pearl Harbor. A shipyard inspection showed that she was suffering badly from rusting and corrosion inside her tanks, in some cases structural members were found rusted completely through. With newer submarines now available for offensive war patrols and not willing to delay work on newer boats at Pearl Harbor, Dolphin was assigned less dramatic but still vital service on training duty until 29 January 1944, when she sailed for exercises in the Canal Zone. She then sailed for Portsmouth Navy Yard where she was given patch repairs only, with her operating depth reduced to 150 feet. Dolphin was then assigned duty as a school boat at Submarine Base New London, Connecticut, where she arrived on 6 March. She served in this essential task until the end of the war, then was decommissioned on 12 October 1945 at the Portsmouth Navy Yard.

Dolphin was sold for scrap on 26 August 1946.

== Popular culture ==
Dolphin was featured in the 1937 movie Submarine D-1. Dolphin was also featured in the TV show JAG S5 E22 - Overdue and Presumed Lost. Although the script of the episode changed what happened to the Dolphin, it still used the correct name and type of submarine the USS Dolphin was.

== Awards ==
- American Defense Service Medal with "FLEET" clasp
- American Campaign Medal
- Asiatic-Pacific Campaign Medal with two battle stars for World War II service
- World War II Victory Medal

== See also ==
- Unrestricted submarine warfare
- Torpedo
- List of submarine classes of the United States Navy
- List of lost United States submarines
- List of submarines of the Second World War
