= USS Cachalot (SS-170) =

Submarine of the United States

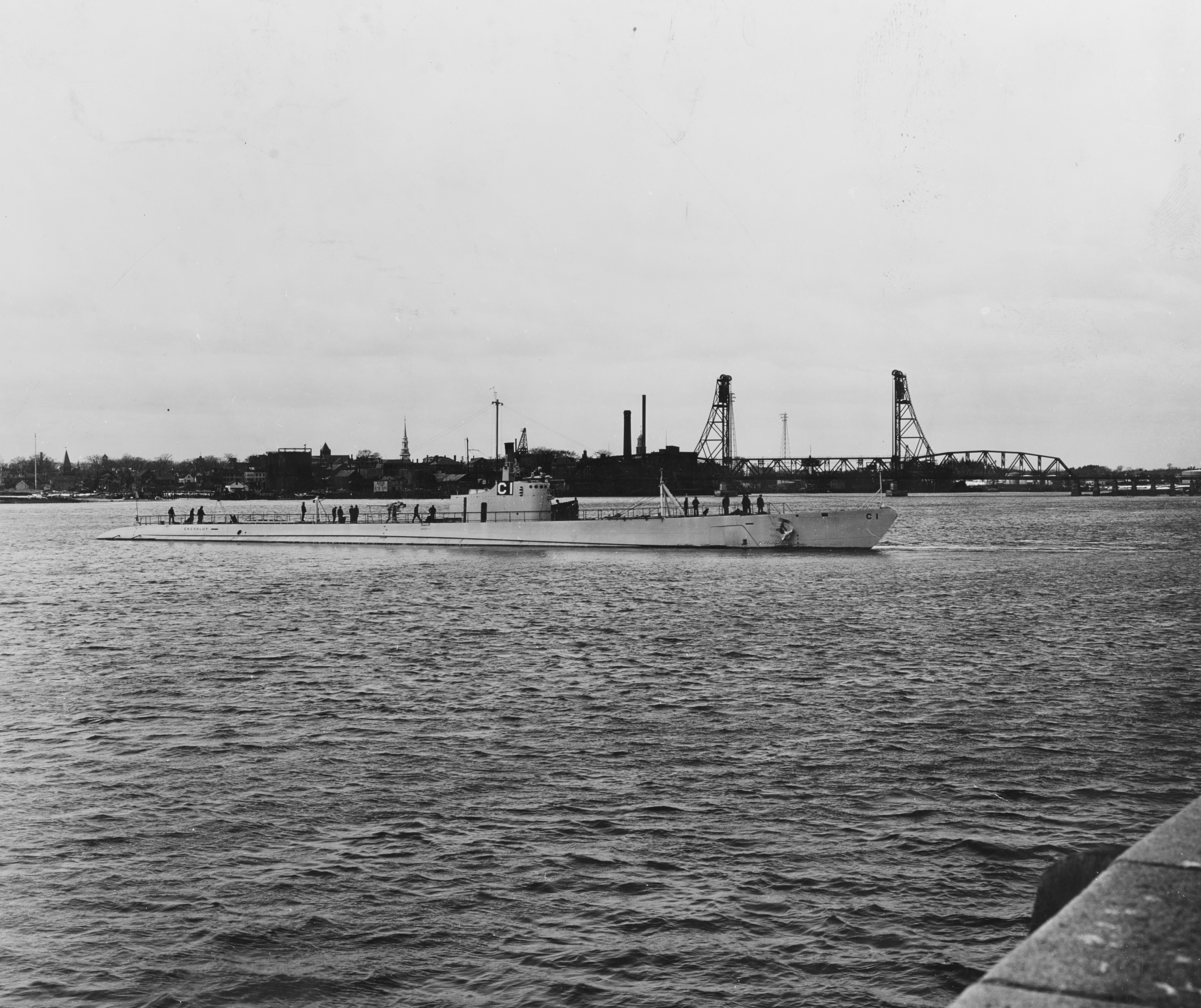
- USS Cachalot SS-170

History

United States
- Name: USS Cachalot
- Namesake: sperm whale
- Builder: Portsmouth Naval Shipyard, Seavey's Island, Kittery, Maine
- Laid down: 21 October 1931
- Launched: 19 October 1933
- Commissioned: 1 December 1933
- Decommissioned: 17 October 1945
- Stricken: 1 November 1945, reinstated 28 November 1945, stricken again 8 July 1946
- Honors and awards: 3 × battle stars
- Fate: Sold for breaking up, 26 January 1947

General characteristics
- Class & type: V-8 Cachalot-class composite direct drive diesel and diesel-electric submarine
- Displacement: 1,110 tons (1,130 t) surfaced, standard, 1,650 tons (1,680 t) submerged
- Length: 271 ft 11 in (82.88 m)
- Beam: 24 ft 11 in (7.59 m)
- Draft: 16 ft 3 in (4.95 m) maximum
- Propulsion: As Built: 2 × BuEng-built, MAN-designed direct drive main diesel engines, 1,535 hp (1,145 kW) each, 1 × BuEng MAN auxiliary diesel driving a 330 kW (440 hp) electric generator, 2 × Westinghouse electric motors, 800 hp (600 kW) each, 2 × 120-cell Exide WLLH31 batteries, 2 shafts; Re-engined 1937-38: 2 × Winton GM 16-278 diesels, 1,600 hp (1,200 kW) each,
- Speed: 17 kn (31 km/h) surfaced, 8 kn (15 km/h) submerged, 7 knots (13 km/h) submerged, service, 1939
- Range: 6,000 nautical miles (11,000 km) @ 10 kn (19 km/h), 14,000 nmi (26,000 km) @ 10 kn (19 km/h) with fuel in main ballast tanks, 83,290 US gallons (315,300 L) oil fuel
- Endurance: 10 hours at 5 kn (9.3 km/h)
- Test depth: 250 ft (80 m)
- Complement: 6 officers, 39 enlisted (peacetime); 7 officers, 48 enlisted (war)
- Armament: 6 × 21 inch (533 mm) torpedo tubes (four forward, two aft, 16 torpedoes), 1 × 3 inch (76 mm)/50 caliber deck gun

USS Cachalot (SC-4/SS-170) was a United States Navy submarine and the lead ship of her class, known as the "V-boats" and named for the sperm whale. Her keel was laid down by the Portsmouth Navy Yard. She was launched on 19 October 1933 as V-8 (SC-4) sponsored by Miss K. D. Kempff, and commissioned on 1 December 1933 with Lieutenant Commander Merril Comstock in command. Cachalot was the first submarine to have the Torpedo Data Computer, Arma Corporation's Mark 1, installed.

== Design ==
Cachalot was built by the Portsmouth Navy Yard, as were most of the previous V-boats. Design conservatism and economic realities forced Portsmouth to continue to use riveting in the construction of the inner and outer hulls, although non-critical areas like the superstructure, piping brackets, support framing, and interior tankage were actually welded. Her sister, Cuttlefish (the first submarine built by Electric Boat since the S-class of 1925) had most of the outer hull and fuel tanks welded, while retaining riveting for the inner hull. Both were medium-sized submarines built under the tonnage limits of the London Naval Treaty of 1930. An extensive study was conducted to determine the optimum submarine size under the treaty restrictions, factoring in total force, endurance, and percentage of the force that could be maintained on station far from a base, as in a Pacific war scenario. Despite the calculation process, size reduction had gone too far with the Cachalots, limiting their patrol endurance. After three Pacific war patrols, Cachalot was relegated to training duties in September 1942, once numerous Gato-class boats became available.

The as-built engine specifications were two BuEng-built, MAN-designed M9Vu 40/46 nine-cylinder two-cycle direct drive main diesel engines, 1,535 hp (1,145 kW) each, with one BuEng MAN two-cycle auxiliary diesel engine, driving a 330 kW (440 hp) electric generator. The auxiliary engine was for charging batteries or for increased surface speed via a diesel-electric system providing power to the main electric motors. As with most V-boats, the main engines proved troublesome, and were replaced in 1937-38 by two Winton GM 16-278 16-cylinder four-cycle diesels, 1,600 hp (1,200 kW) each.

== Service history ==
=== Inter-war period ===
After shakedown, further construction, tests, and overhaul, Cachalot sailed for San Diego, California, where on 17 October 1934 she joined the Submarine Force, U.S. Fleet. Operating until 1937 principally on the West Coast, she engaged in fleet problems, torpedo practice, and antisubmarine, tactical, and sonar training exercises. She cruised twice to Hawaiian waters and once to the Panama Canal Zone to participate in large-scale fleet exercises.

Cachalot cleared San Diego on 16 June 1937, bound for New London, Connecticut, and duty in experimental torpedo firing for the Newport Torpedo Station and sonar training for the New London Submarine School until 26 October 1937, when she began a lengthy overhaul at the New York Navy Yard. This included replacement of her troublesome engines with General Motors Winton engines. A year later, she sailed for participation in a fleet problem, torpedo practice and sound training in the Caribbean Sea and off the Canal Zone, and on 16 June 1939 reported at Pearl Harbor for duty with the Submarine Force and the Scouting Force.

=== World War II ===
War came to Cachalot as she lay in Pearl Harbor Navy Yard in overhaul. In the Japanese attack on Pearl Harbor of 7 December 1941, one of her men was wounded, but the submarine suffered no damage. Yard work on her was completed at a furious pace, and on 12 January 1942 she sailed on her first war patrol. After fueling at Midway Island, she conducted a reconnaissance of Wake Island, Eniwetok, Ponape, Truk, Namonuito, and the Hall Islands, returning to Pearl Harbor on 18 March with vitally needed intelligence of Japanese bases. Her second war patrol, for which she cleared from Midway on 9 June, was conducted off the Japanese home islands, where she damaged an enemy tanker. Returning to Pearl Harbor on 26 July, she cleared on her final war patrol on 23 September, penetrating the frigid waters of the Bering Sea in support of the Aleutian Islands operations.

Over-age and lacking endurance for strenuous war patrols, Cachalot still had a key role to play, acting as training ship for the Submarine School at New London. She served there from late 1942 until 30 June 1945, when she sailed to Philadelphia, Pennsylvania, being decommissioned there on 17 October. She was sold for scrap on 26 January 1947.

== Awards ==
- American Defense Service Medal with "FLEET" clasp
- American Campaign Medal
- Asiatic-Pacific Campaign Medal with three battle stars for World War II service
- World War II Victory Medal

== Gallery ==
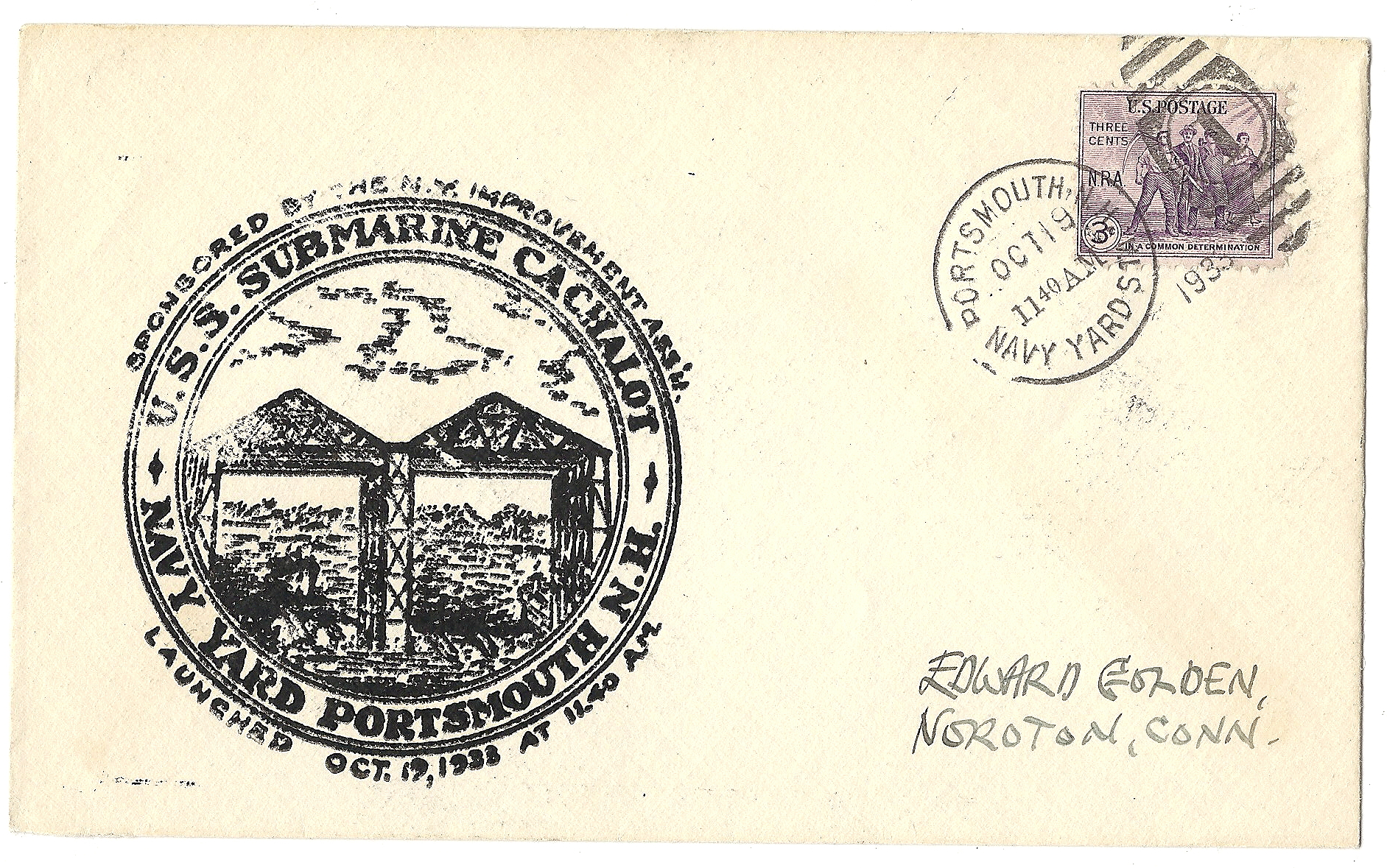
Souvenir of the launch of the USS Cachalot

== See also ==
- List of submarine classes of the United States Navy
