= V-boat =

Group of U.S. Navy submarines and classes derived from them

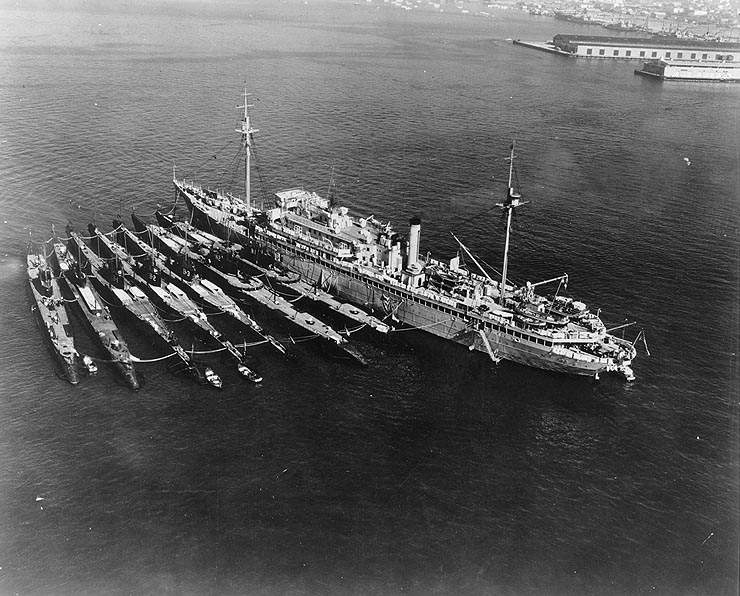
- V-boats (left to right): Cachalot, Dolphin, Barracuda, Bass, Bonita, Nautilus, Narwhal, with submarine tender Holland.

Class overview
- Builders: Portsmouth Naval Shipyard, Mare Island Naval Shipyard, Electric Boat Company
- Operators: United States Navy
- Preceded by: S class and T class
- Succeeded by: Porpoise class
- Built: 1921–1934
- In commission: 1924–1945
- Completed: 9
- Lost: 1
- Retired: 8

The V-boats were a group of nine United States Navy submarines built between World War I and World War II from 1921 to 1934 under authorization as the "fleet boat" program.

The term "V-boats" as used includes five separate classes of submarines: large, fast fleet submarines (V-1 through V-3), large long-range submarines (the minelayer V-4 and two submarine cruisers V-5 and V-6) and three medium-sized submarines (V-7 through V-9).

The successful fleet submarines of World War II (Tambor class through Tench class) were descended from the last three, especially V-7, though somewhat larger and powered by pure diesel-electric propulsion systems.

Originally called USS V-1 through V-9 (SS-163 through SS-171), in 1931 the nine submarines were renamed Barracuda, Bass, Bonita, Argonaut, Narwhal, Nautilus, Dolphin, Cachalot, and Cuttlefish, respectively. All served in World War II, six of them on war patrols in the central Pacific. Argonaut was lost to enemy action.

== Background ==
In the early 1910s, only 12 years after Holland inaugurated the Navy's undersea force, naval strategists had already begun to wish for submarines that could operate in closer collaboration with the surface fleet than the Navy's existing classes, which had been designed primarily for coastal defense. These notional "fleet" submarines would necessarily be larger and better armed. Still, primarily, they would need a surface speed of some 21 kn (24 mph; 39 km/h) to be able to maneuver with the 21-knot battleships around which the battle fleet was built. This was the designed speed of the Delaware class and later battleships, including the standard-type battleships that were under construction and proposed in 1913.

In the summer of 1913, Electric Boat's chief naval architect, former naval constructor Lawrence Y. Spear, proposed two preliminary fleet-boat designs for consideration in the Navy's 1914 program. In the ensuing authorization of eight submarines, Congress specified that one should "be of a seagoing type to have a surface speed of not less than twenty knots". This first fleet boat, laid down in June 1916, was named USS Schley after Spanish–American War hero Winfield Scott Schley. With a displacement of 1,106 long tons (1,124 t) surfaced, 1,487 long tons (1,511 t) submerged, on a length of 270 ft (82 m), Schley (later AA-1, and finally T-1) was twice as large as any previous U.S. submarine. To achieve the required surface speed, two tandem 1,000 hp (750 kW) diesel engines on each shaft drove twin screws, and a separate diesel generator was provided to charge the batteries. Although Schley and two sisters authorized in 1915—USS T-2 (SS-60) (originally AA-2), and USS T-3 (SS-61) (originally AA-3)—all made their design speed of 20 kn (23 mph; 37 km/h), insoluble torsional vibration problems with their tandem engines made them very troublesome ships, and they were decommissioned in 1922-1923 after a service life of only a few years. Because the engines were clutched together, perfectly synchronizing their operation was impossible.

In 1916, well before the T class debacle transpired, Congress authorized 58 coastal submarines and nine additional "fleet" boats. Three of the larger 800 long tons (813 t) coastal boats eventually became competing prototypes for the long-lived, 51-member S class. The nine "fleet boats" became the "V-boats", built between 1921 and 1934, and in fact, they were the only U.S. submarines produced in that period. Although V-4, V-5, and V-6 were the largest US non-nuclear submarines ever built, only V-1 through V-3 were designed to reach a speed of 21 knots.

== V-1 through V-3—the Barracudas ==
The first three V-boats were funded in fiscal year 1919, laid down at the Portsmouth Navy Yard in October and November 1921, and commissioned somewhat less than a year apart between 1924 and 1926. Significantly, V-1, V-2, and V-3 were the only members of the class designed to satisfy the Navy's original "fleet boat" requirement for high surface speed. These were large and powerfully engined submarines, displacing 2,119 long tons (2,153 t) surfaced and 2,506 long tons (2,546 t) submerged on a length of 342 ft (104 m). The propulsion plant was divided between two separate engine rooms—forward and aft of the control room—with two 2,250 hp (1,680 kW) main-propulsion direct-drive diesels aft, and two independent 1,000 hp (750 kW) diesel generators forward. The latter were primarily for battery charging, but to achieve maximum surface speed, they could augment the mechanically coupled main-propulsion engines by driving the 1,200 hp (890 kW) electric motors in parallel. This partial diesel-electric propulsion system foreshadowed the later successful all-diesel-electric submarines, although nearly 10 years of development were required before it was reliable. The three boats were partially double-hulled and fitted forward with buoyancy tanks inside a bulbous bow for better surface sea-keeping. They were armed with six 21-inch (533mm) torpedo tubes, four forward and two aft with 12 torpedoes, plus a 5-inch (127 mm)/51 caliber deck gun.

Unfortunately, the first three V-boats had poor operational performance. Designed for 21 kn (24 mph; 39 km/h) on the surface, they only made 18.7 kn (21.5 mph), and also failed to make their submerged design speed of 9 kn (10 mph; 17 km/h). As built, they were somewhat too heavy forward, which made them poor sea boats, even after replacing the original deck guns with smaller 3-inch (76 mm)/50 caliber models to save weight in 1928. Moreover, both the main propulsion diesel engines and their original electric motors were notoriously unreliable, and full-power availability was rare. Renamed Barracuda, Bass, and Bonita in 1931, they were decommissioned in 1937, and only the imminence of World War II provided a reprieve, in preparation for which they were recommissioned in September 1940. Just before Pearl Harbor, the three boats were transferred to Coco Solo, Panama Canal Zone, and each conducted several defensive war patrols (without seeing any action) off the approaches to the Panama Canal.

All three boats were overhauled at the Philadelphia Navy Yard in late 1942 and early 1943, and converted to cargo submarines by removing both torpedo tubes and main engines, thereby leaving them solely dependent on their diesel generators for propulsion. Because this rendered the boats severely underpowered, they apparently never served operationally in their cargo-carrying role; instead, they were relegated to training duties at New London until just before the end of the war in 1945. After decommissioning, Barracuda and Bonita were scrapped, and Bass was scuttled as a sonar target near Block Island, Rhode Island.

== V-4—Argonaut ==
Displacing 4,164 long tons (4,231 t), submerged, V-4—later USS Argonaut (SM-1)—was both the largest submarine the Navy ever built before the advent of nuclear power and the only U.S. submarine specifically designed as a minelayer. Her configuration, and that of the following V-5 and V-6, resulted from an evolving strategic concept that increasingly emphasized the possibility of a naval war with Japan in the far western Pacific. This factor, and the implications of the 1922 Washington Naval Treaty, suggested the need for long-range submarine "cruisers", or "strategic scouts", as well as long-range minelayers, for which long endurance, not high speed, was most important. The design was possibly influenced by the German "U-cruisers" of the Type U-139 and Type U-151 U-boat classes, although V-4, V-5, and V-6 were all larger than these. Funded in fiscal year 1925, laid down at Portsmouth in May of that year, and commissioned in April 1928, V-4 was 381 ft (116 m) long overall and carried four 21-inch (533 mm) torpedo tubes forward and two 40 in (1,000 mm) mine-laying chutes and their associated mechanical handling equipment aft. Two 6-inch (152 mm)/53 caliber deck guns were equipped, the largest deck guns ever on a US submarine. Considerable engine room volume was sacrificed to achieve an internal payload of 60 specially designed Mark XI moored mines. Consequently, the main propulsion diesels were limited to a total of 2,800 hp (2,100 kW), yielding only 15 kn (17 mph; 28 km/h) on the surface.

The V-4 was a significant boat in that it was the first submarine in the USN to incorporate welding in its construction. All submarines before V-4 were of all-riveted construction. Engineers at Portsmouth Navy Yard, led by Navy welding expert James W. Owens, experimented with welding for the first time during her construction. Welding was used in non-critical areas, including the superstructure, piping brackets, and support framing. The rest of the V-4's construction, including the pressure hull, was riveted or bolted. The rest of the V-class, to some extent, incorporated welding into their construction.

An over-large, under-powered, and one-of-a-kind submarine, Argonaut was never particularly successful, but stayed in commission all through the 1930s. Early in World War II, she was re-engined at Mare Island to increase her main propulsion output to 4,800 hp (3,600 kW), and additionally received two external stern torpedo tubes and two stern deck stowage tubes. Despite having never laid a mine in anger, her mine-laying gear was stripped out at this time to prepare for conversion to a troop-carrying submarine. Then, at Pearl Harbor, the conversion was completed. In that guise, and accompanied by Nautilus, she participated in the US Marine assault on Japanese-held Makin Atoll by Carlson's Raiders in August 1942. In transferring to Brisbane, Australia, late that year, Argonaut was diverted to a war patrol near Bougainville in the northern Solomon Islands, and was lost with all hands on 10 January 1943 after attacking a heavily defended Japanese convoy.

== V-5 and V-6—Narwhal and Nautilus ==
In their overall appearance and dimensions, V-5, later Narwhal and V-6, later Nautilus were similar to Argonaut and constituted "submarine cruiser" counterparts at least partially inspired by German success with long-range submarine commerce raiders of the Type U-139 and Type U-151 U-boat classes in World War I. Endurance, sea-keeping, increased torpedo capacity, and large deck guns were emphasized at the cost of high speed. Initially, a small scouting seaplane was to be carried in a water-tight hangar abaft the conning tower. The Navy had experimented with seaplanes on submarines with a prototype hangar installation on USS S-1 (SS-105) during the mid-1920s. However, the resulting increase in scouting capability was significantly offset by several additional dangers to the host submarine, and the initiative was dropped.

The two double-hulled boats displaced 2,730 long tons (2,774 t) on the surface and 3,900 long tons (3,963 t) submerged on a length of 370 ft (110 m). They displayed prominent "surface-ship" characteristics, notably high freeboard and an expansive deck structure. Each was powered by two 10-cylinder, two-stroke, 2,350 hp (1,750 kW) MAN diesel engines (designed by the German firm that built engines that powered many German U-boats of World War I, the rights to which the U.S. Navy purchased to build domestically for their own submarines). They also had a pair of smaller 450 hp (340 kW) diesel-powered generators for charging batteries or augmenting the main propulsion engines on the surface. On trials, the two boats achieved nearly 17.5 kn (20.1 mph; 32.4 km/h) surfaced and 8 kn (9.2 mph; 15 km/h) submerged, and their claimed endurance was 18,000 mi (16,000 nmi; 29,000 km) at 10 kn (12 mph; 19 km/h). In addition to the customary torpedo tubes—four forward and two aft with 24 torpedoes (eight external)—they (and Argonaut) carried two 6-inch (152 mm)/53 caliber deck guns, the largest ever mounted on U.S. submarines.

Funded in 1926 and commissioned in 1930, V-5 and V-6 proved too large and unwieldy for successful operation: slow to dive, challenging to maneuver, and easy to detect. Nonetheless, as Narwhal and Nautilus, they served usefully in the 1930s, and just before World War II, Nautilus was modified to carry 20,000 US gal (76,000 L) of aviation gasoline for refueling seaplanes at sea. Early in the war, each was refitted with four 1,600 hp (1,200 kW) General Motors diesels and four additional external torpedo tubes (two bow and two stern). Despite their age and inherent design flaws, they went on to compile enviable war records.

Narwhal completed 15 successful war patrols and Nautilus 14; together, they are credited with sinking 13 enemy ships, totaling 35,000 tons. Somewhat more serendipitously, their large size made them useful for carrying both troops and cargo on covert missions. Thus, Nautilus joined with Argonaut in transporting Carlson's Raiders to Makin Atoll, and then with Narwhal, landed a strong detachment of the US Army's Alaskan Scouts on Attu in the Aleutian Islands, preparatory to the main landing that regained that island from the Japanese in May 1943. For the final two years of the war, the two boats were devoted almost exclusively to clandestine insertion and retrieval operations behind enemy lines, particularly in preparation for the U.S. campaign to retake the Philippines.

With the end of the war in sight, Narwhal and Nautilus were withdrawn from service in April and June 1945, respectively, and sold for breaking up soon thereafter. Narwhal's 6-inch (152 mm) guns are retained as a memorial at the Naval Submarine Base New London, Connecticut.

== V-7—Dolphin ==
The penultimate design in the V-boat series was laid down at Portsmouth in June 1930 as V-7 and was launched as Dolphin two years later. Although her name was changed while she was still on the building slip, she never officially carried the name V-7 during her commissioned service. With a length of 319 ft (97 m) and a displacement only a little more than half that of her three predecessors (1,718 long tons (1,746 t) surfaced, 2,240 long tons (2,276 t) submerged), Dolphin was clearly an attempt to strike a happy medium between those latter ships and earlier S-class submarines, which were little more than large coastal boats. The general arrangement of propulsion machinery was identical to that of V-5 and V-6, but even with a surface displacement of only 1,718 tons, Dolphin's scaled-down main engines—rated at 1,750 hp (1,300 kW) each—could only just deliver the surface speed of the larger ships, and her endurance and torpedo load-out were much reduced. The torpedo armament consisted of six 21-inch (533 mm) tubes (4 bow, 2 stern), with 18 torpedoes. A 4-inch (102 mm)/50 caliber deck gun was equipped. Dolphin's size and weight were nearly ideal for the range and duration of the war patrols that became customary in the Pacific during World War II. The wartime Gato, Balao, and Tench classes had similar dimensions. Portsmouth continued the welding experiments begun on V-4, 5, and 6 and expanded them to include portions of the internal framing, tanks, and outer hull.

Early in the war, Dolphin made three patrols from Pearl Harbor without notable distinction. Her deteriorating material condition soon restricted her to training duties, first in Hawaii, and then at New London, Connecticut, for the duration of the war. She was decommissioned in October 1945 and sold for scrapping a year later.

== V-8 and V-9—Cachalot and Cuttlefish ==
Even before V-5 and V-6 had been completed and V-7 laid down, submarine officer opinion had begun to shift in favor of smaller boats similar to Germany's 1,200-ton SM U-135 design from World War I. Then, when the London Naval Treaty of 1930 for the first time imposed international limits on total submarine tonnage, the incentive to build smaller ships became especially compelling. The restrictions of the London Naval Treaty were a factor in the disposal in 1930 of T-1, T-2, and T-3, which had been laid up for nearly a decade. By special agreement, Argonaut, Narwhal, and Nautilus were exempted from the treaty limitations.

An extensive study was conducted to determine the optimum submarine size under the treaty restrictions, factoring in total force, endurance, and percentage of the force that could be maintained on station far from a base, as in a Pacific war scenario. The result was the two smallest V-boats, Cachalot (originally V-8) and Cuttlefish (originally V-9), funded in fiscal year 1932. At 271 ft (83 m) overall and only 1,130 long tons (1,148 t) surface displacement, Cachalot and Cuttlefish were even smaller than the T-boats of 15 years earlier. The engineering plant consisted of two innovative, compact Maschinenfabrik Augsburg-Nürnberg (MAN)-designed, BuEng-built main diesels, supposedly capable of delivering 1,535 hp (1,145 kW) each, plus a single diesel generator rated at 440 hp (330 kW). Although the boats achieved 17 kn (20 mph; 31 km/h) during trials, the new MAN engines repeatedly failed due to excessive vibration. They were replaced in 1938 with General Motors diesel engines with reduction gearing. The armament was similar to Dolphin: six 21-inch (533 mm) torpedo tubes (4 bow, 2 stern), with 16 torpedoes. A 3-inch (76 mm)/50 caliber deck gun was equipped, a decrease in gun caliber that would persist through early World War II. In the 1930s, it was believed that a larger gun would encourage submarine captains to fight on the surface against superior anti-submarine ships, but wartime experience ultimately demonstrated that a larger gun was required.

The Navy assigned Cuttlefish to the Electric Boat Company, the first submarine contract award to a private yard since the last of the S-class in 1918. Accordingly, Cuttlefish differed from her Portsmouth-built sister, Cachalot, in many respects, including more spacious internal arrangements, and the first installation of air conditioning on a U.S. submarine. Electric Boat expanded the use of welding in its boats, with much of the outer hull welded, but the internal pressure hull still riveted. Moreover, Cachalot and Cuttlefish served as the first test beds for the Mark I Torpedo Data Computer that revolutionized underwater fire control in the mid-1930s.

Unfortunately, because small size severely limited their speed, endurance, and weapons load, neither boat was successful under the conditions of the Pacific War. Each did three scoreless war patrols in the central and western Pacific, and Cachalot did one in Alaskan waters. Still, by late 1942, it was clear both were out-classed and worn out, and they finished the war at New London as training ships. The two were decommissioned in October 1945 and broken up several years later.

== Submarines ==
In 1920, the Navy adopted a hull number scheme that distinguished between coastal and general purpose boats, designated "SS", and fleet boats, designated "SF." Accordingly, T-1 through T-3 were originally designated SF-1 through SF-3, and V-1 through V-7 were designated SF-4 through SF-10. The system was changed to designate V-boats as "SC" (cruiser submarines) before V-8 and V-9 were ordered. In 1931, all received names and all except V-4 were redesignated to the "SS" series. V-4 was also designated SM-1 at one time, as a "submarine mine-layer".

Construction data
| Ship name and hull no. in 1931 | Ship name and hull no. as ordered | Builder | Laid Down | Launched | Commissioned | Decommissioned | Fate |
|---|---|---|---|---|---|---|---|
| Barracuda (SS-163) | V-1 (SF-4) | Portsmouth Naval Shipyard | 20 October 1921 | 17 July 1924 | 1 October 1924 | 3 March 1945 | Scrapped 1945 |
| Bass (SS-164) | V-2 (SF-5) | Portsmouth Naval Shipyard | 20 October 1921 | 27 December 1924 | 26 September 1925 | 3 March 1945 | Scuttled 1945 |
| Bonita (SS-165) | V-3 (SF-6) | Portsmouth Naval Shipyard | 16 November 1921 | 9 June 1925 | 22 May 1926 | 3 March 1945 | Scrapped 1945 |
| Argonaut (SM-1) | V-4 (SF-7) | Portsmouth Naval Shipyard | 1 May 1925 | 10 November 1927 | 2 April 1928 | 10 January 1943 | Lost to enemy action 10 January 1943 |
| Narwhal (SS-167) | V-5 (SF-8/SC-1) | Portsmouth Naval Shipyard | 10 May 1927 | 17 December 1928 | 15 May 1930 | 23 April 1945 | Scrapped 1945 |
| Nautilus (SS-168) | V-6 (SF-9/SC-2) | Mare Island Naval Shipyard | 2 August 1927 | 15 March 1930 | 1 July 1930 | 30 June 1945 | Scrapped 1945 |
| Dolphin (SS-169) | V-7 (SF-10/SC-3) | Portsmouth Naval Shipyard | 14 June 1930 | 8 March 1932 | 1 June 1932 | 2 October 1945 | Scrapped 1946 |
| Cachalot (SS-170) | V-8 (SC-4) | Portsmouth Naval Shipyard | 21 October 1931 | 19 October 1933 | 1 December 1933 | 17 October 1945 | Scrapped 1947 |
| Cuttlefish (SS-171) | V-9 (SC-5) | Electric Boat Company | 7 October 1931 | 21 November 1933 | 8 June 1934 | 24 October 1945 | Scrapped 1947 |

== See also ==
- Allied submarines in the Pacific War
- Unrestricted submarine warfare
- Torpedo
- List of submarine classes of the United States Navy
- List of lost United States submarines
- List of submarines of the Second World War
