= USS Narwhal (SS-167) =

Submarine of the United States

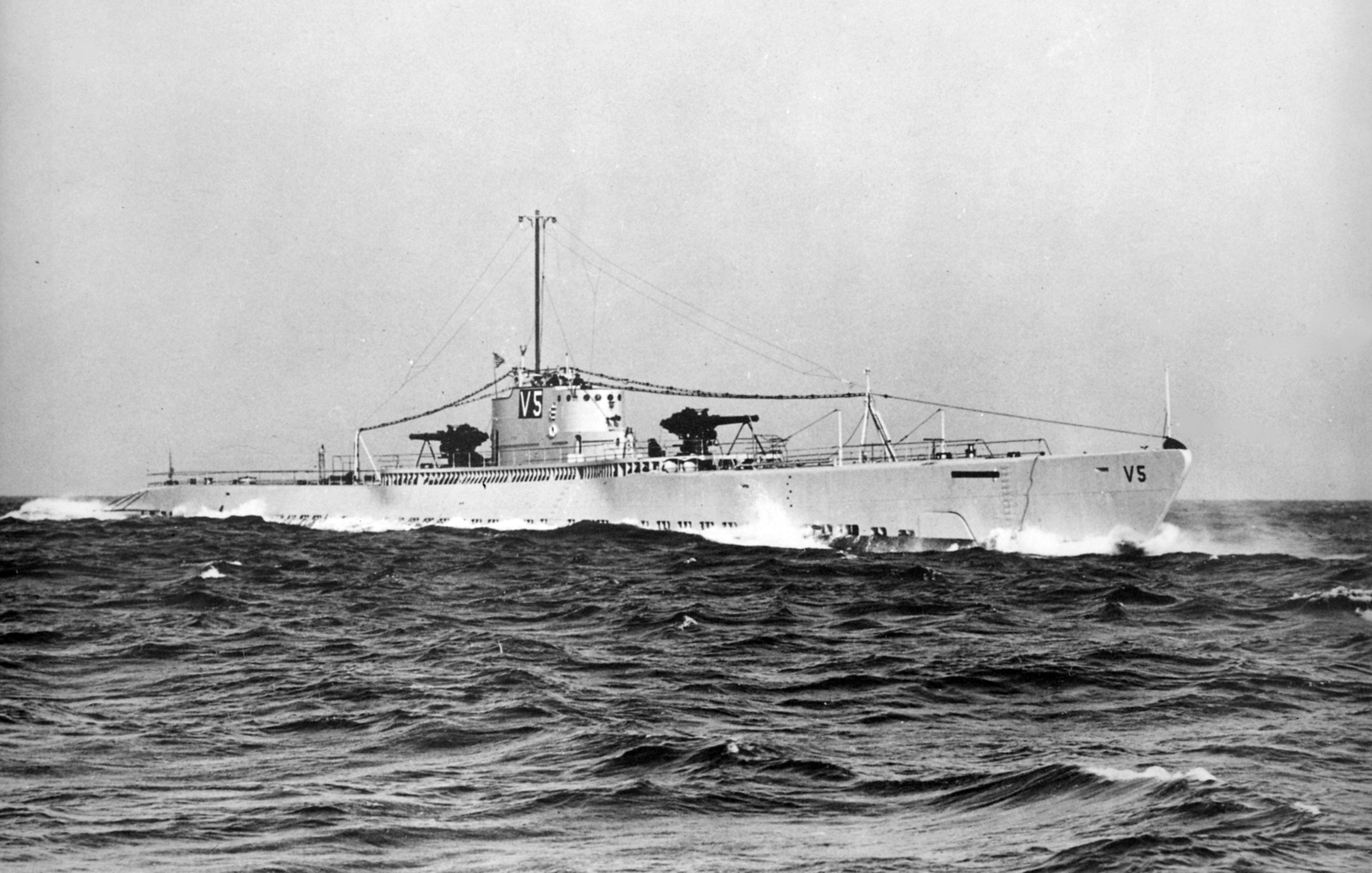
- USS Narwhal (SS-167) at sea, 1931

History

United States
- Name: USS Narwhal
- Builder: Portsmouth Naval Shipyard, Kittery, Maine
- Laid down: 10 May 1927
- Launched: 17 December 1928
- Commissioned: 15 May 1930
- Decommissioned: 23 April 1945
- Stricken: 19 May 1945
- Fate: Sold for breaking up, 16 November 1945

General characteristics
- Class & type: V-boat V-5 composite direct-drive diesel and diesel-electric submarine
- Displacement: 2,730 long tons (2,770 t) surfaced, standard, 3,900 long tons (4,000 t) (submerged)
- Length: 349 ft (106 m) (waterline), 371 ft (4,450 in) (overall)
- Beam: 33 ft 3 1/4 in (10.141 m)
- Draft: 16 ft 11 1/4 in (5.163 m)
- Propulsion: As Built: 2 × BuEng-built, MAN-designed> direct-drive main diesel engines, 2,350 hp (1,750 kW) each, 2 × BuEng MAN; 300 kW (400 hp) auxiliary diesel generators, 2 × 120-cell Exide ULS37 batteries, 2 × Westinghouse electric motors, 800 hp (600 kW) each; Re-engined 1942: 4 × General Motors Winton Model 16-278A 16-cylinder two-cycle diesel-electric diesel engines, 1,600 hp (1,200 kW) each, 2 × GM Winton 8-268A 2-cycle auxiliary diesel generators, 300 kW (400 hp) each, 2 × 120-cell Exide UHS39B batteries, 2 × Westinghouse electric motors, 1,270 hp (950 kW) each, Fairbanks-Morse reduction gears, 2 × shafts
- Speed: 17.4 kn (20.0 mph; 32.2 km/h) surfaced, trial, 14 kn (16 mph; 26 km/h) surfaced, service; 8 kn (9.2 mph; 15 km/h) submerged, 6.5 kn (7.5 mph; 12.0 km/h) submerged, service, 1939
- Range: 9,380 nmi (10,790 mi; 17,370 km) @ 10 kn (12 mph; 19 km/h), 25,000 nmi (29,000 mi; 46,000 km) @ 5.7 kn (6.6 mph; 10.6 km/h) with fuel in main ballast tanks
- Endurance: 10 hours at 5 kn (5.8 mph; 9.3 km/h); (bunkerage) 178,460–182,778 US gallons (675,540–691,890 L)
- Test depth: 300 ft (90 m)
- Complement: As Built: 9 officers, 10 petty officers, 70 enlisted; 1942: 9 officers, 88 enlisted; 1943: 8 officers, 80 enlisted
- Armament: 6 × 21-inch (533 mm) torpedo tubes (four forward, two aft; 24 torpedoes including 6 in deck stowage); (four external tubes {two each bow and stern, four torpedoes} were added 1942-3; provision for 8–12 additional torpedoes externally); 2 × 6-inch (152 mm)/53 caliber guns Mark XII Mod. 2 wet type deck guns

USS Narwhal (SS-167), the lead ship of her class of submarine and one of the "V-boats", was the second ship of the United States Navy to be named for the narwhal. She was named V-5 (SC-1) when her keel was laid down on 10 May 1927 by the Portsmouth Navy Yard in Kittery, Maine.

== Design ==
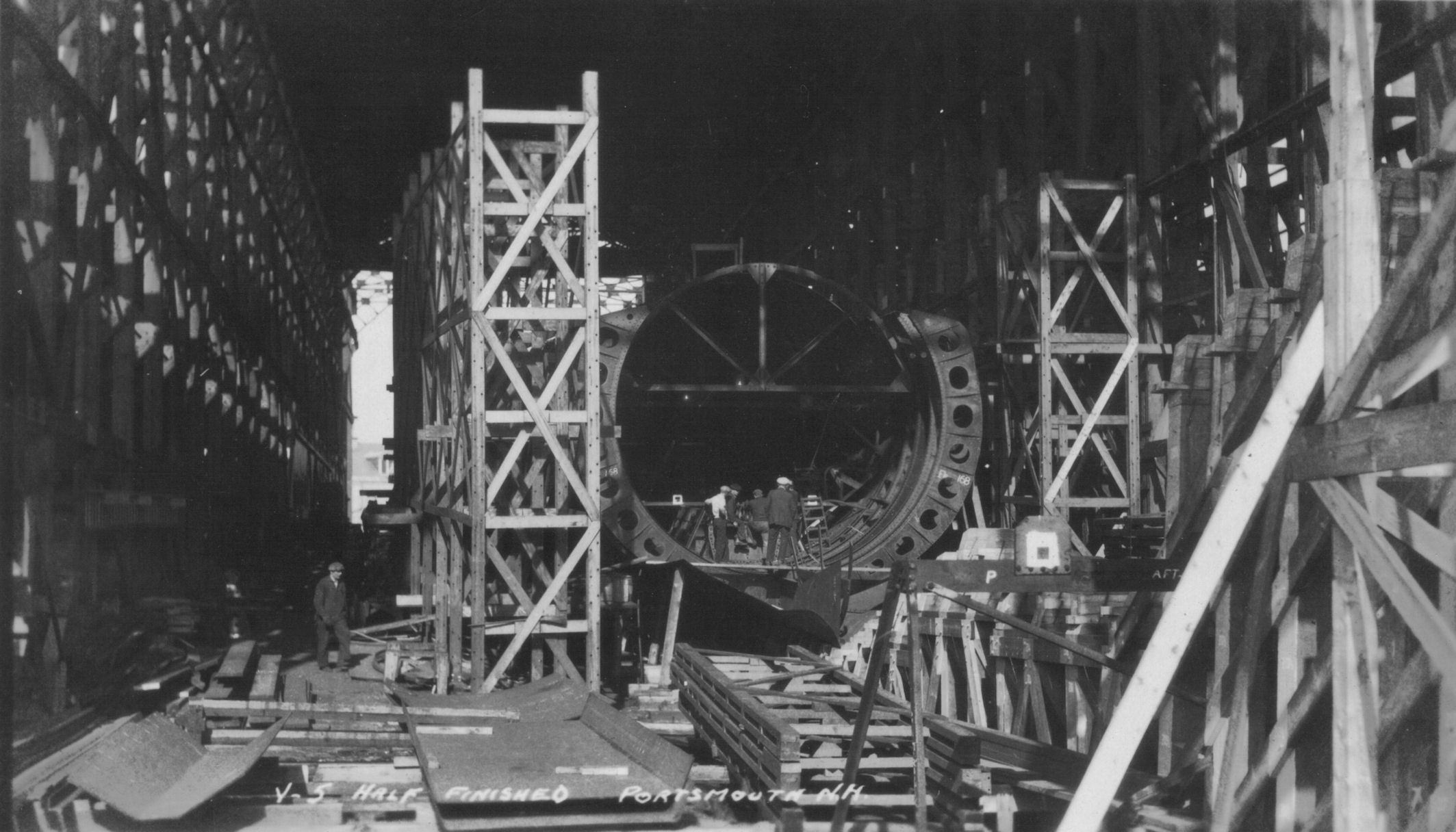
V-5 a.k.a. USS Narwhal under construction at Portsmouth Naval Shipyard, 1927

V-5 was generally similar to the preceding submarine minelayer V-4, although slightly smaller and lacking a minelaying system. The configuration of V-4, V-5, and V-6 resulted from an evolving strategic concept that increasingly emphasized the possibility of a naval war with Japan in the far western Pacific. This factor, and the implications of the 1922 Washington Naval Treaty, suggested the need for long-range submarine "cruisers", or "strategic scouts", as well as long-range minelayers, for which long endurance, not high speed, was most important. The design was possibly influenced by the German "U-cruisers" of the Type U-139 and Type U-151 U-boat classes, although V-4, V-5, and V-6 were all larger than these. A raised gun platform was provided around the conning tower, and deck stowage for spare torpedoes was included under the platform and in the superstructure. V-5 and her near-sisters V-4 (Argonaut) and V-6 (Nautilus) were initially designed with larger and more powerful MAN-designed diesel engines than the Busch-Sulzer engines that propelled earlier V-boats, which were failures. Unfortunately, the specially built engines failed to produce their design power, and some developed dangerous crankcase explosions. The engineering plant was replaced in 1942.

The as-built engine specifications were two BuEng-built, MAN-designed direct-drive 10-cylinder 4-cycle main diesel engines, 2,350 hp (1,750 kW) each, with two BuEng MAN 4-cycle 6-cylinder auxiliary diesel engines, 450 hp (340 kW) each, driving 300 kW (400 hp) electric generators. The auxiliary engines were for charging batteries or for increased surface speed via a diesel-electric system providing power to the main electric motors.

V-5 was built to a partial welded/partial riveted construction method. Welding was used to join the vertical keel plates, and also in other non-critical areas like the superstructure, piping brackets, and support framing. The inner and outer hulls were still entirely riveted.

== Construction and commissioning ==
V-5 was launched on 17 December 1929, sponsored by Mrs. Frances Adams (née Lovering), wife of Charles F. Adams, Secretary of the Navy, and commissioned on 15 May 1930, Lieutenant Commander John H. Brown Jr. in command.

== Interwar period ==
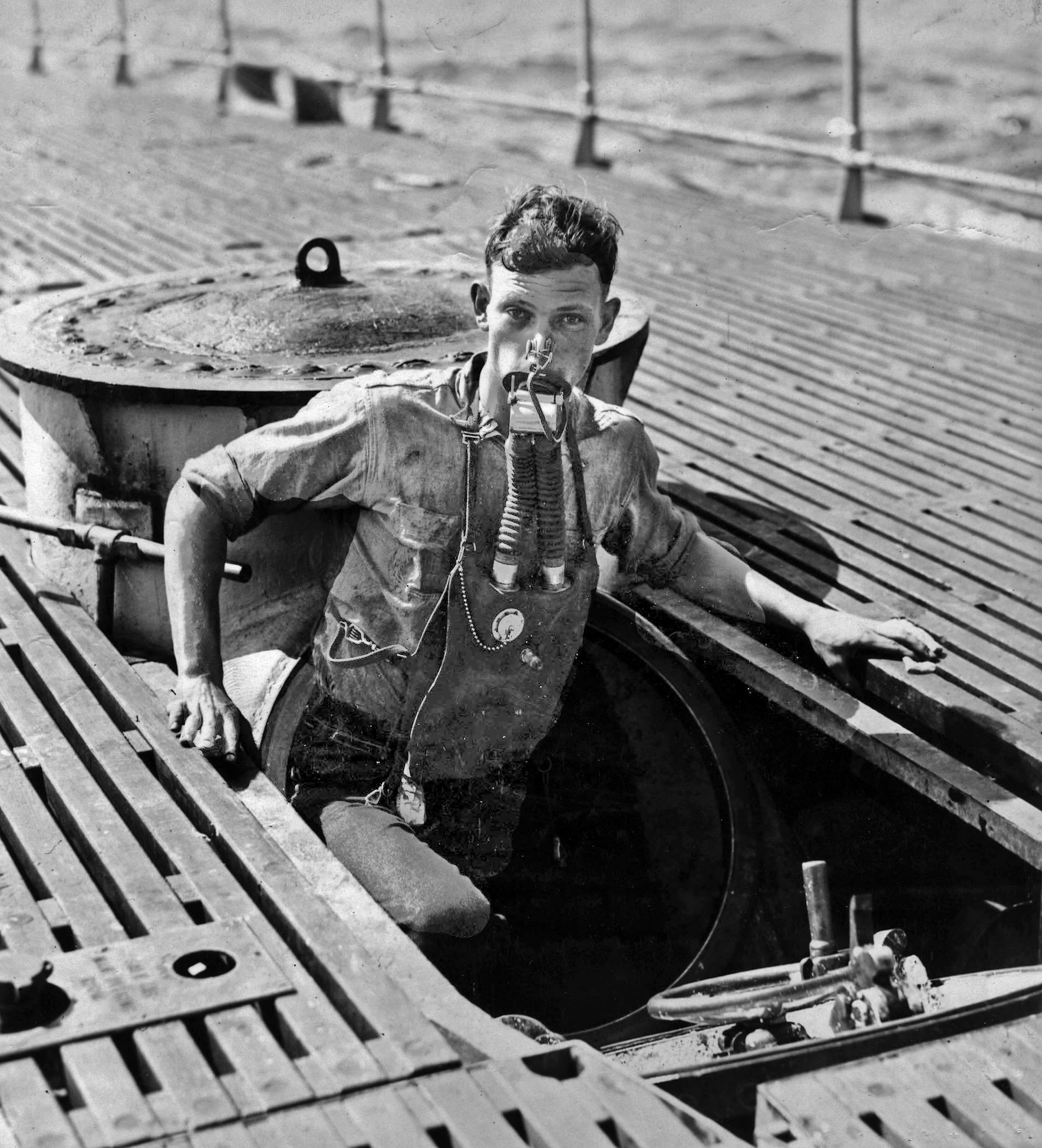
A Momsen lung in use during training – USS V-5 (SC 1) crewman A. L. Rosenkotter exits the submarine's escape hatch wearing the "Momsen Lung" emergency escape breathing device during the submarine's sea trials in July 1930. The emergency breathing device was named for its inventor, U.S. Navy submarine rescue pioneer Cdr. Charles "Swede" Momsen. The submarine V-5 was later renamed USS Narwhal (SS 167).

V-5 departed Annapolis, Maryland on 11 August 1930 for a cruise to the West Indies, returning to Portsmouth on 11 September. She trained in New England waters until 31 January 1931, when she sailed for the West Coast via the Panama Canal, arriving San Diego on 4 April. On 19 February, V-5 was renamed Narwhal and on 1 July received the new hull number SS-167. After overhaul at Mare Island Navy Yard, Narwhal departed on 2 February 1932 for fleet exercises off Hawaii. She returned to San Diego on 17 March. After patrol duty along the West Coast, the submarine got underway on 12 July 1934 for a cruise with Submarine Division 12 (SubDiv 12) until her arrival at San Diego on 18 September. For the next three years, she operated as far north as Seattle, Washington and as far west as Pearl Harbor, which became her home base for operations through 1941. On a 30 day pre-war training cruise in 1941, Narwhal lost 20,000 gallons of fuel oil due leakage from her riveted fuel tanks.

== World War II ==
Narwhal was one of four submarines in overhaul caught by the Japanese attack on Pearl Harbor in the early morning of 7 December 1941. Within minutes of the first enemy bomb explosions on Ford Island, Narwhal's gunners were in action to assist in the destruction of two torpedo planes.

=== 1st–3rd Patrols and overhaul, February 1942 – April 1943 ===
On her first war patrol – from 2 February to 28 March 1942 – Narwhal, with Lieutenant Commander Charles W. "Weary" Wilkins in command, departed Pearl Harbor to reconnoiter Wake Island on 15–16 February, then continued on to the Ryukyu Islands. On 28 February, she made her first torpedo attack of the war, heavily damaging Maju Maru. Six days later, the submarine sank Taki Maru in the East China Sea.

She spent her second war patrol – from 28 May – 13 June – in defense of Midway Atoll. As Task Force 16 with the aircraft carriers Enterprise, Hornet, and Task Force 17 with Yorktown, prepared to meet the Japanese attack, Narwhal joined Plunger and Trigger in scouting east of Midway; during the Battle of Midway on 3–6 June, these submarines – along with 15 others – accomplished nothing as the Japanese did not move east of Midway.

Narwhal's third patrol – from 7 July – 26 August – took her close to Hokkaidō to stalk Japanese shipping off the Kurile Islands. She claimed two small inter-island freighters on 24 and 28 July. One reference credits Narwhal with 3 sinkings on 24 July. However, it is likely that the gunboat mentioned was too small to be considered in the official tally, and the other two sinkings are the ones that took place around this date. On 1 August, Narwhal included Meiwa Maru to her credit despite aircraft bomb and depth charge retaliation. One reference credits Narwhal with an additional sinking on 1 August (the tanker Koan Maru). Seven days later, she sank Bifuku Maru. On the morning of 14 August, the submarine raised her periscope to discover three enemy destroyers crossing her stern in column. She waited while the destroyers "were running all over the ocean" dropping depth charges. Only slightly damaged, Narwhal departed her patrol area the next day.

On 8 September, Narwhal sailed from Pearl Harbor for the West Coast, arriving Mare Island Navy Yard on 15 September for overhaul. Her aging BuEng MAN engines were replaced at this time with four GM-Winton 16-278As and other upgraded machinery, including more powerful electric motors and new batteries. She also received four external torpedo tubes, two in the bow and two on top of the stern casing, and may have received increased torpedo deck stowage as well. She went on to San Diego on 4 April 1943, arriving two days later to embark a company of the 7th Infantry Division Provisional Scout Battalion (including Alaskan Native scouts of the Alaska Territorial Guard) for the invasion of Attu Island. On 18 April, she set course for Alaska, arriving at Dutch Harbor on 27 April.

=== 4th–8th Patrols, April 1943 – December 1943 ===
The submarine began her fourth war patrol – from 30 April to 25 May – departing Dutch Harbor for the western Aleutian Islands. She rendezvoused with sister ship Nautilus on 11 May off the northern side of Attu Island, and the two ships debarked Army Scouts in rubber boats for the preliminary landings in the recapture of the island, a venture successfully completed on 29 May. Narwhal returned to Pearl Harbor with a stopover at Dutch Harbor on 14 and 18 May.

With Commander Frank D. Latta in command, she again got underway for the Kurile Islands on her fifth war patrol, from 26 June – 7 August. Her mission – beginning on 11 July – was to create diversion by bombarding an air base on Matsuwa. Lapon, Permit, and Plunger were about to attempt an exit from the previously impenetrable Sea of Japan which they had so daringly invaded. The night of 15 July, Narwhal drew so much enemy attention to her presence she was forced to dive from the shells, but she accomplished her mission: the other submarines slipped through Etorofu Strait without detection.

Narwhal made her sixth war patrol – from 31 August to 2 October – off the Marshall Islands. On the morning of 11 September, she torpedoed and sank Hokusho Maru before a Japanese escort caught up with her. After a severe depth charging, she departed for the Kwajalein Atoll area. By the end of September, the submarine was en route to Brisbane.

Upon arrival, Narwhal prepared to participate in the campaign to assist the guerrilla movement in the Philippines begun in January 1943, when Gudgeon disembarked six Filipinos and a ton of equipment on Negros Island. Narwhal eventually became the leading submarine in supporting the Philippine guerrilla movement with nine secret transport missions to her credit.

Narwhal was loaded down with 92 short tons (83 t) of ammunition and stores and a party of ten for her seventh patrol, from 23 October – 22 November, supporting Philippine guerrillas. She was in the Sulu Sea, off Mindanao, the night of 10 November en route to Puluan Bay when two Japanese ships astern opened fire. The night of 13 November, she entered Ptiluan Bay stealthily to disembark her passengers and half of her cargo while lying off the starboard side of Dona Jitana Maru. By midnight Narwhal was safely on her way to Nasipit, on Mindanao, where she docked on 15 November to unload the rest of her stores to the tune of "Anchors Aweigh" played by a grateful Filipino band. She then embarked 32 evacuees, including eight women, two children, and a baby, for Darwin, Australia, and the end of her patrol.

Picking up such odd assortments of passengers and secret cargo soon became routine for Narwhal. She departed on her eighth war patrol – from 25 November – 18 December – with the usual cargo and 11 Army operatives bound for Cabadbaran, on Mindanao, arriving Butuan Bay on 2 December for disembarking. With seven evacuees on board, Narwhal sailed for Majacalar Bay, arriving off Negros Island on 3 December. Taking on nine more people, she stood out of Alajacalar Bay on 5 December. Around sunrise that same day, the submarine sank Hinteno Maru in a blaze of gunfire. On 11 December, she disembarked her passengers at Port Darwin, then continued on to Fremantle, Western Australia.

=== 9th–12th Patrols, January 1944 – July 1944 ===
On her ninth war patrol – from 18 January to 15 February 1944 – the submarine returned to Darwin to embark observer Commander F. Kent Loomis and more stores. Following a nighttime transit of the Surigao Strait, Narwhal slipped west and north, made a submerged patrol off Naso Point, Panay, then headed for Pandan Bay to transfer cargo to sailing craft. With six new passengers, she came off Negros Island on 7 February to deposit 45 tons of supplies. Narwhal then received 28 more evacuees for the trip to Darwin, including Professor Roy Bell and family.

On her tenth war patrol – from 16 February – 20 March – Narwhal delivered more ammunition to Butuan Bay on 2 March. With 28 new people on board, she departed on 3 March for Tawi-Tawi. That evening, she damaged Karatsu (the captured USS Luzon (PR-7)) and was heavily bombarded with depth charges by enemy escorts for her trouble. On the night of 5 March, two small boats – assisted by rubber boats from Narwhal – put off for shore with cargo. Three Japanese destroyers closed in later; she eluded them and transferred her passengers, now a total of 38, to Chinampa on 11 March before docking at Fremantle.

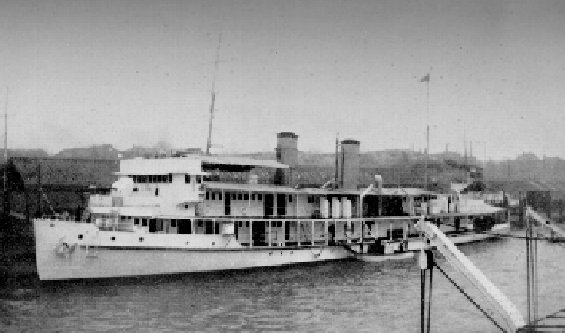
USS Luzon, damaged while serving under Japanese command by USS Narwhal

Narwhal, with Commander Jack C. Titus in command, departed on her 11th war patrol – from 7 May – 9 June – for Alusan Bay, Samar, where she landed 22 men and supplies, including electric lamps, radio parts, and flour for the priests, the night of 24 May. By 1 June, the submarine was unloading 16 men and stores on the southwest coast of Mindanao. She ended this patrol at Port Darwin.)

The twelfth war patrol – from 10 June – 7 July – gave Narwhal a chance for some action. On 13 June, she submerged for reconnaissance of Bula, Ceram Island, an enemy fuel depot. That night, the submarine closed the shore and fired 56 rounds of 6-inch (152 mm) projectiles to destroy several gasoline storage tanks and set fires around a power house and pumping station area before she had to retreat from the salvos directed at her. Three minutes before sunset on 20 June, she rendezvoused with native boats to send her cargo ashore during a suspenseful nine and one-half hours. Within 30 minutes she had completed unloading and taking on 14 evacuees, but a submarine chaser was in her wake. Narwhal evaded him to do some shooting herself the next day at a Japanese motorized sailboat and on 22 June at the tanker Itsukushima Maru. After putting her evacuees ashore at Port Darwin on 29–30 June, she continued to Fremantle.

=== 13th–15th Patrols, Decommissioning, and Scrapping, August 1944 – May 1945 ===
Her 13th war patrol – from 12 August – 10 September – started at Fremantle and ended at Port Darwin. On the night of 30 August, Narwhal surfaced in Dibut Bay on the east coast of Luzon for her usual disembarking procedures, greatly speeded this time by the use of bamboo rafts built by the shore party under the direction of Major Robert Lapham and Lieutenant Commander Charles "Chick" Parsons, a liaison man in the Philippine supply and evacuation missions. Before midnight on 2 September, Narwhal sent a party and supplies ashore to a beach off the mouth of the Masanga River, and received four evacuees in return to complete the patrol.

On her 14th war patrol – from 14 September – 5 October – Narwhal deposited men and stores on Cebu Island on 27 September, then took off for Siari Bay, where on 29 September she received 31 liberated prisoners-of-war (POWs) rescued from the sea after Paddle sank two Japanese transports off Sindagan Point on 7 September. However, according to a POW survivor's account, Narwhal picked up 82 POW's, survivors of the Shin'yō Maru incident, vice 31 at Siari, Mindanao. "Forty-one placed in the forward torpedo room and 41 in the aft torpedo room". Narwhal found herself in danger the afternoon of 30 September, when she submerged to avoid a Japanese antisubmarine patrol plane, her stern planes locked in a 20° down-angle. Forced to blow her main ballast to stop the steep dive, Narwhal reversed direction and popped out of the water stern first just two minutes after she went down. Luckily, the patrol plane could not maneuver fast enough to return before she again dove.

After a short refit at Mios Woendi, Dutch New Guinea, Narwhal conducted her 15th and last war patrol from 11 October – 2 November, with Commander William G. Holman in command. Friday the 13th brought a near attack by a PBY Catalina. Once the submarine was recognized, the aircraft signaled "GOOD LUCK NARWHAL." The evening of 17 October she was off a Tawi Tawi beach to deliver 11 short tons (10.0 t) of cargo. Two days later she unloaded the rest of her cargo and 37 men at Negros Island and took on her last passengers, 26 in all, for the trip to Brisbane, Queensland.

Narwhal departed Brisbane on 6 January 1945 for the east coast via the Panama Canal, entering the Philadelphia Navy Yard on 21 February, where she was decommissioned on 23 April. She was stricken from the Naval Vessel Register on 19 May and sold for scrap. Narwhal's two 6-inch (152 mm) guns are permanently enshrined at the Naval Submarine Base New London, at Groton, Connecticut. There is an oral tradition in the US submarine force that USS Narwhal (SSN-671) received her hull number as a deliberate re-arrangement of the older Narwhal's hull number of SS-167.

== Awards ==
- American Defense Service Medal with "FLEET" clasp
- Asiatic-Pacific Campaign Medal with 15 battle stars for World War II service
- World War II Victory Medal

Narwhal′s 15 battle stars for World War II service tied her with USS Thresher (SS-200) for the most battle stars earned by a submarine, placing them amongst the most decorated US Naval vessels of World War II.

== Memorial ==
The town of Nasipit in Agusan del Norte, created a memorial in commemoration of the USS Narwhal's efforts during World War II.

== In popular culture ==
A 1958 episode of the television series The Silent Service called "Narwhal's Passenger From Mindanao," detailed a rescue operation involving Narwhal under Titus's command.

The opening of the movie Operation Pacific may have been inspired by the Narwhal's seventh war patrol, where 32 civilians, including 8 children and a baby, were evacuated to Australia.

== See also ==
- Wendell Fertig
