= USS Bass (SS-164) =

Submarine of the United States

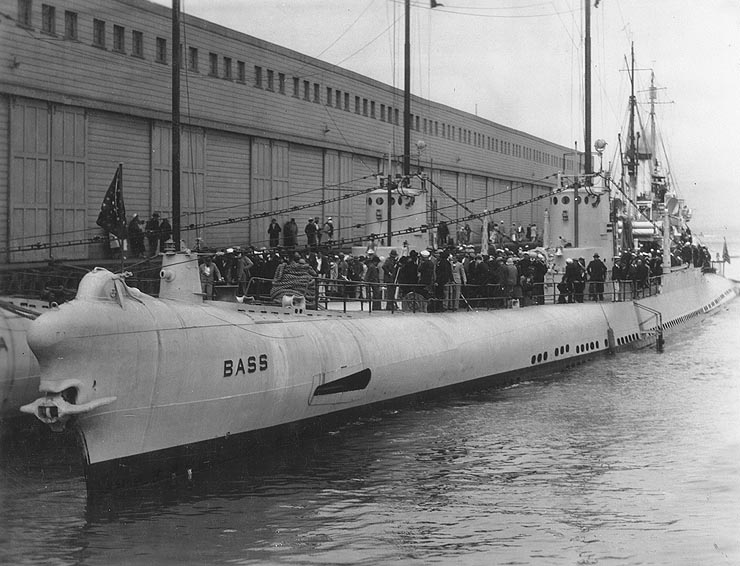
- USS Bass (SS-164)

History

United States
- Builder: Portsmouth Naval Shipyard, Kittery, Maine
- Laid down: 20 October 1921
- Launched: 27 December 1924
- Commissioned: 26 September 1925
- Decommissioned: 9 June 1937
- Commissioned: 5 September 1940
- Decommissioned: 3 March 1945
- Stricken: 10 March 1945
- Fate: Scuttled as a sonar target off Block Island, 12 March 1945

General characteristics
- Class & type: V-boat V-2 composite direct-drive diesel and diesel-electric submarine
- Displacement: 2,119 tons (2,153 t) surfaced, 2,506 tons (2,546 t) submerged
- Length: 326 ft (99 m) (waterline), 341 ft 6 in (104.09 m) (overall)
- Beam: 27 ft 6 5/8 in (8.398 m)
- Draft: 15 ft 2 in (4.62 m)
- Propulsion: (as built) 2 × Busch-Sulzer direct-drive main diesel engines, 2,250 hp (1,680 kW) each; 2 × Busch-Sulzer auxiliary diesel engines, 1,000 hp (750 kW) each, diesel-electric drive; Auxiliary engines replaced with BuEng MAN engines 1940, main engines removed 1942-43 on conversion to a cargo submarine; 2 × 60-cell Exide batteries; 2 × Elliott electric motors, 1,200 hp (890 kW) each; 2 shafts
- Speed: 21 knots (39 km/h) surfaced, 9 knots (17 km/h) submerged
- Range: 6,000 nautical miles (11,000 km) @ 11 knots (20 km/h), 11,000 nautical miles (20,000 km) at 11 kn with fuel in main ballast tanks (bunkerage 90,935 US gallons (344,230 L)
- Endurance: 10 hours @ 5 knots (9 km/h)
- Test depth: 200 ft (60 m)
- Complement: As Designed: 8 officers, 80 enlisted; 1931: 7 officers, 11 chief petty officers (CPOs), 69 enlisted; 1938: 7 officers, 9 CPOs, 70 enlisted (1938); Conversion to Transport, 1943: 9 officers, 44 enlisted
- Armament: 6 × 21-inch (533 mm) torpedo tubes (four forward, two aft, 12 torpedoes; removed 1943), (as built)1 × 5 inch (127 mm)/51 caliber deck gun (changed to 1 × 3 inch (76 mm)/50 caliber gun 1928, removed 1943)

USS Bass (SF-5/SS-164), a Barracuda-class submarine and one of the "V-boats", was the first ship of the United States Navy to be named for the bass.

== Construction and commissioning ==
Bass′s keel was laid at the Portsmouth Navy Yard. She was launched as V-2 (SF-5) on 27 December 1924 sponsored by Mrs. Douglas E. Dismukes, wife of Captain Dismukes, and commissioned on 26 September 1925. Like her sisters, Bass was designed to meet the fleet submarine requirement of 21 knots (39 km/h) surface speed for operating with contemporary battleships.

== Engineering ==
V-2 was completed with two Busch-Sulzer direct-drive 6-cylinder 2-cycle main diesel engines of 2,250 hp (1,680 kW) each, along with two Busch-Sulzer auxiliary diesel engines of 1,000 hp (750 kW) each, driving electrical generators. The latter were primarily for charging batteries, but to reach maximum surfaced speed, they could augment the mechanically coupled main-propulsion engines by supplying supplemental power to the 1,200 hp (890 kW) electric motors that were intended for submerged propulsion. Although it wasn't until about 1939 that its problems were fully solved, electric transmission in a pure diesel-electric arrangement became the propulsion system for the successful fleet submarines of World War II, the Porpoise-class, and the Tambor-class through the Tench-class. Prior to recommissioning in 1940, the auxiliary diesels were replaced with two BuEng Maschinenfabrik Augsburg Nürnberg AG (MAN-designed) 6-cylinder 4-cycle diesel engines of 1,000 hp (750 kW) each. In 1942-43 Bass was converted to a cargo submarine, with the main engines removed to provide cargo space, significantly reducing her speed on the remaining auxiliary diesels.

The conversion failed to make the submarines effective cargo carriers. On 6 August 1943 in a message with the date-time of 06 1945 Admiral Nimitz proposed the three converted submarines be used to support Philippines guerilla operations to free fleet boats doing so for their primary mission of shipping destruction. The next day Admiral King in 07 1538 COMINCH to CINCPAC directed Admiral Nimitz's "personal opinion" of such use with respect to their auxiliary engines "not improved with age," their slow diving time had not improved and that "oil leaks are as abundant as always." By message 11 0631 CINCPAC to COMINCH Nimitz noted he thought the conversion had been done to make them effective for the proposed purpose but in light of a remedy of those deficiencies being a diversion of needed resources for new construction "I regretfully withdraw suggestion in my 061945."

== Service history ==
=== Inter-war period ===
V-2 was assigned to Submarine Division 20 (SubDiv 20) and cruised along the Atlantic coast and in the Caribbean Sea until November 1927, when the Division sailed for San Diego, California, arriving on 3 December 1927. V-2 operated with the fleet on the West Coast, in the Hawaiian Islands, and in the Caribbean Sea until December 1932. During this period her 5 inch (127 mm)/51 caliber deck gun was replaced by a 3 inch (76 mm)/50 caliber weapon.

Renamed Bass on 9 March 1931, she was assigned to SubDiv 12 in April. On 1 July, her hull classification symbol was changed from SF-5 to SS-164. On 2 January 1933, she was assigned to Rotating Reserve SubDiv 15, San Diego. Bass rejoined the fleet again in July and cruised along the West Coast, in the Canal Zone, and in the Hawaiian Islands until January 1937. She then departed the West Coast and arrived at Philadelphia, Pennsylvania on 18 February 1937, where she went out of commission in reserve on 9 June.

=== World War II ===
Bass was recommissioned at Portsmouth, New Hampshire on 5 September 1940, and assigned to SubDiv 9, Atlantic Fleet. From February–November 1941, she operated along the New England coast and made two trips to St. George, Bermuda. She arrived at Coco Solo, Canal Zone on 24 November and was on duty there when the Japanese launched their attack on Pearl Harbor.

In 1942, Bass was attached to Submarine Squadron 3 (SubRon 3), SubDiv 31, Atlantic Fleet. From March–August, while based at Coco Solo, she made four war patrols in the Pacific, off Balboa, Panama. While at sea on 17 August 1942, a fire broke out in the after battery room and quickly spread to the aft torpedo room and starboard main electric motor, resulting in the death of 26 enlisted men by asphyxiation. The following day, Antaeus arrived to assist the submarine and escorted her into the Gulf of Dulce, Costa Rica. Both then proceeded to Balboa.

Bass remained in the Canal Zone until October 1942, when she departed for Philadelphia, Pennsylvania, arriving on 19 October. Bass was then overhauled at Philadelphia Navy Yard. At this time she was converted to a cargo submarine with the removal of her main engines, severely restricting her speed on the remaining auxiliary engines. Bass proceeded to New London, Connecticut where she conducted secret experiments off Block Island in December 1943. She was again in Philadelphia for repairs from January–March 1944. During the remainder of the year, she was attached to SubRon 1, Atlantic Fleet, and operated out of New London in the area between Long Island and Block Island.

Bass was decommissioned at the Naval Submarine Base New London on 3 March 1945 and expended as a target for the Mark 24 Fido "mine" (actually an acoustic homing torpedo) on 12 March 1945. The location of the wreck is 41°01′N 071°32′W, about 10 miles south of Block Island.

== Wreck survey ==
The wreck was relocated during the 1960s at about 155 ft (47.2 m) and is an Advanced SCUBA dive site. Mapping in 2019 with synthetic aperture sonar (SAS) showed the wreck to be in two parts with the break forward of the conning tower. The aft section is about 245 ft (74.7 m) with the forward section, resting on its port side, about 80 ft (24.4 m).
