= USS Bonita (SS-165) =

Submarine of the United States

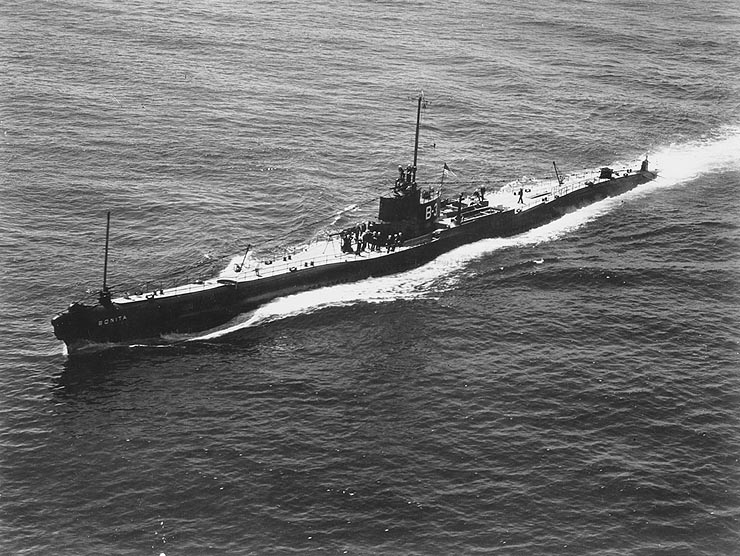
- USS Bonita (SS-165)

History

United States
- Builder: Portsmouth Naval Shipyard, Kittery, Maine
- Laid down: 16 November 1921
- Launched: 9 June 1925
- Commissioned: 22 May 1926
- Decommissioned: 4 June 1937
- Commissioned: 5 September 1940
- Decommissioned: 3 March 1945
- Stricken: 10 March 1945
- Fate: Sold for breaking up, 4 October 1945

General characteristics
- Class & type: V-boat V-3 composite direct-drive diesel and diesel-electric submarine
- Displacement: 2,119 tons (2,153 t) surfaced, 2,506 tons (2,546 t) submerged
- Length: 341 ft 6 in (104.09 m)
- Beam: 27 ft 6 5/8 in (8.398 m)
- Draft: 15 ft 2 in (4.62 m)
- Propulsion: (as built) 2 × Busch-Sulzer direct-drive main diesel engines, 2,250 hp (1,680 kW) each; 2 × Busch-Sulzer auxiliary diesel engines, 1,000 hp (750 kW) each, diesel-electric drive; Auxiliary engines replaced with BuEng MAN engines 1940, main engines removed 1942-43 on conversion to a cargo submarine; 2 × 60-cell Exide batteries; 2 × Elliott electric motors, 1,200 hp (890 kW) each; 2 shafts
- Speed: 21 knots (39 km/h) surfaced, 9 knots (17 km/h) submerged
- Range: 6,000 nautical miles (11,000 km) @ 11 knots (20 km/h), 11,000 nautical miles (20,000 km) @ 11 kn with fuel in main ballast tanks
- Endurance: 10 hours @ 5 knots (9 km/h)
- Test depth: 200 ft (60 m)
- Complement: 7 officers, 11 petty officers, 69 enlisted
- Armament: 6 × 21-inch (533 mm) torpedo tubes (four forward, two aft), 12 torpedoes; 1 × 5 inch (127 mm)/51 caliber deck gun

USS Bonita (SF-6/SS-165), a Barracuda-class submarine and one of the "V-boats," was the third ship of the United States Navy to be named for the bonito. Her keel was laid down by the Portsmouth Navy Yard. She was launched on 9 June 1925 as V-3 (SF-6), sponsored by Mrs. L.R. DeSteiguer, wife of Rear Admiral DeSteiguer, and commissioned on 22 May 1926, Lieutenant Commander Charles A. Lockwood, Jr. in command. Like her sisters, Bonita was designed to meet the fleet submarine requirement of 21 knots (39 km/h) surface speed for operating with contemporary battleships.

== Engineering ==
V-3 was completed with two Busch-Sulzer direct-drive 6-cylinder 2-cycle main diesel engines of 2,250 hp (1,680 kW) each, along with two Busch-Sulzer auxiliary diesel engines of 1,000 hp (750 kW) each, driving electrical generators. The latter were primarily for charging batteries, but to reach maximum surfaced speed, they could augment the mechanically coupled main-propulsion engines by supplying supplemental power to the 1,200 hp (890 kW) electric motors that were intended for submerged propulsion. Although it wasn't until about 1939 that its problems were fully solved, electric transmission in a pure diesel-electric arrangement became the propulsion system for the successful fleet submarines of World War II, the Porpoise-class, and the Tambor-class through the Tench-class. Prior to recommissioning in 1940, the auxiliary diesels were replaced with two BuEng Maschinenfabrik Augsburg Nürnberg AG (MAN-designed) 6-cylinder 4-cycle diesel engines of 1,000 hp (750 kW) each. In 1942-43 Bonita was converted to a cargo submarine, with the main engines removed to provide cargo space, significantly reducing her speed on the remaining auxiliary diesels.

The conversion failed to make the submarines effective cargo carriers. On 6 August 1943 in a message with the date-time of 06 1945 Admiral Nimitz proposed the three converted submarines be used to support Philippines guerilla operations to free fleet boats doing so for their primary mission of shipping destruction. The next day Admiral King in 07 1538 COMINCH to CINCPAC directed Admiral Nimitz's "personal opinion" of such use with respect to their auxiliary engines "not improved with age," their slow diving time had not improved and that "oil leaks are as abundant as always." By message 11 0631 CINCPAC to COMINCH Nimitz noted he thought the conversion had been done to make them effective for the proposed purpose but in light of a remedy of those deficiencies being a diversion of needed resources for new construction "I regretfully withdraw suggestion in my 061945."

== Service history ==
=== Interwar period ===
Assigned to Submarine Division 20 (SubDiv 20), V-3 cruised along the East Coast and in the Caribbean Sea until November 1927. With her division, she then transferred to the Pacific Fleet, arriving at San Diego, California, on 17 December 1927. After service with SubDivs 12 and 20 along the Pacific coast and off Hawaii, she joined SubDiv 15 of the Rotating Reserve at Mare Island Navy Yard on 1 June 1932. During this period her 5 inch (127 mm)/51 caliber deck gun was replaced by a 3 inch (76 mm)/50 caliber weapon. She was renamed Bonita on 9 March 1931 and given hull classification symbol SS-165 on 1 July 1931.

Bonita rejoined SubDiv 12 in September 1933 and cruised in Caribbean Sea, West Coast, and Hawaiian waters through 1936. She departed San Diego, California on 20 January 1937 and arrived at Philadelphia Navy Yard on 18 February. She was placed out of commission in reserve at Philadelphia, Pennsylvania on 4 June 1937.

=== World War II ===
Recommissioned on 5 September 1940, she departed New London, Connecticut on 17 November for Coco Solo, Panama Canal Zone. Bonita patrolled in the Pacific, off Panama, until she returned to Philadelphia for overhaul in October 1942. At this time she was converted to a cargo submarine with the removal of her main engines, severely restricting her speed on the auxiliary engines.

Patrolling off the Maine coast until mid-1943, she then joined Submarine Squadron 1 (SubRon 1), SubDiv 13, on training duty out of New London. She remained on that duty until February 1945. Arriving at Philadelphia Navy Yard on 17 February, she was decommissioned 3 March and sold 28 October 1945.

== Awards ==
- American Defense Service Medal with "FLEET" clasp
- American Campaign Medal
- Asiatic-Pacific Campaign Medal
- World War II Victory Medal
