= Fleet submarine =

Submarine designed to operate in coordination with other vessels of a battle fleet

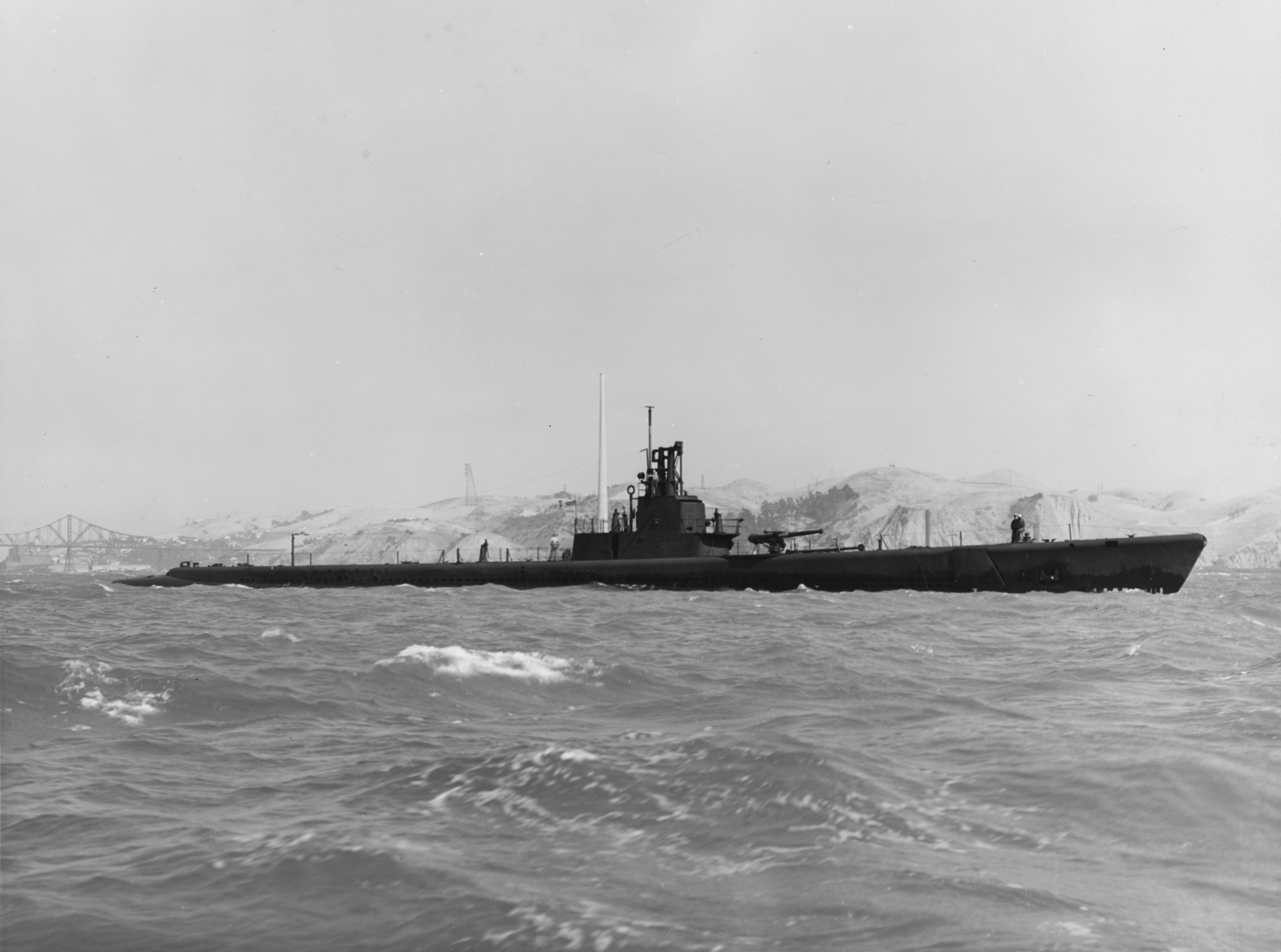
Gato class fleet submarine USS Wahoo

A fleet submarine is a submarine with the speed, range, and endurance to operate as part of a navy's battle fleet. Examples of fleet submarines are the British First World War era K class and the American World War II era Gato class.

The term has survived in Britain to refer to modern nuclear-powered attack submarines. In the United States Navy, the term came to be used primarily for the long-range submarines that served in World War II.

== Examples ==
=== United States ===
The term was used by the United States Navy to distinguish submarines suitable for long range patrols in the Pacific Ocean from earlier classes such as the United States S-class submarines. The initial goal, pursued with frequent interruptions since the AA-1-class (aka T-class) launched 1918–19, was to produce a submarine with a surfaced speed of 21 knots to operate with the Standard-type battleships of the surface fleet. Most of the nine "V-boats" launched 1924–33 (V-1 through V-6) were either attempts to produce a fleet submarine or were long-range submarine cruisers. Eventually, a long range of 11,000 nautical miles (20,000 km) was combined with high speed, beginning with the Salmon-class launched in 1938, to allow sustained operations in Japanese home waters while based at Pearl Harbor. These qualities also proved important in the Pacific commerce raiding of World War II, but the 1922 Washington Naval Treaty's prohibition on unrestricted submarine warfare precluded inter-war planning in this area. Although the Gato-class was considered the fully developed archetype, the earlier Porpoise, Salmon, Sargo and Tambor-classes were incrementally improved prototypes distinctly different from the two contemporary experimental Mackerel-class coastal submarines. The Tambors were fully developed and similar to the Gatos except for diving depth and separation of the engines into two compartments.

=== Japanese ===
Japanese I-boats were a conceptually similar long-range differentiation from smaller "medium" or "sea-going" Ro-boats, although some I-boats had features like aircraft hangars and large-caliber deck guns more often associated with submarine cruisers.

=== British ===
In order to reach the speeds – over 20 knots while surfaced – required to match their capital ships and to be able to screen ahead of the fleet or flank the enemy, the British initially used steam propulsion. The K-class entering service in 1916 were large for their time. Although able to achieve 24 knots, the complexity of shutting down boilers and stowing funnels made them slow to dive.

As the speed of capital ships increased, the United Kingdom abandoned the fleet submarine concept following completion of three 21-knot River-class submarine submarines of the early 1930s using supercharged diesels, because the size required for range and surface speed decreased maneuverability.

=== Others ===
Continental European nations sometimes used the terms "ocean-going", "long-patrol", "type 1" or "1st class" submarines, generally referring to Atlantic or Indian Ocean operations in the absence of anticipated need for Pacific patrols, and often without the speed for fleet operations.

== Comparison of World War II submarines ==
Name	Type	Nation	Surface Displacement	Submerged Displacement	Speed	Torpedo Tubes	Crew	Reference
Gato class	fleet submarine	United States	1,525 tons	2,415 tons	20 kt	10	80	
Thames class	fleet submarine	United Kingdom	1,850 tons	2,723 tons	22 kt	8	61	
Kaidai class	fleet submarine	Japan	1,833 tons	2,602 tons	23 kt	6	80	
Type IXD2	ocean-going submarine	Germany	1,616 tons	1,804 tons	19 kt	6	57	
Redoutable-class	ocean-going submarine	France	1,570 tons	2,084 tons	17 kt	9	61	
Kaichū type	medium submarine	Japan	1,115 tons	1,447 tons	19 kt	4	80	
Type XB	minelayer	Germany	1,763 tons	2,177 tons	16 kt	2	52	
Cagni class	submarine cruiser	Italy	1,461 tons	2,136 tons	18 kt	14	85	
Type B1	submarine cruiser	Japan	2,584 tons	3,654 tons	23 kt	6	100	
O 21-class	medium submarine	Netherlands	888 tons	1,186 tons	19 kt	8	55	
Type VIIC	medium submarine	Germany	769 tons	871 tons	17 kt	5	44	
Pietro Micca	minelayer	Italy	1,371 tons	1,883 tons	15 kt	6	66	
600 series	medium submarine	Italy	615 tons	855 tons	14 kt	6	41	
S-class	medium submarine	United Kingdom	715 tons	990 tons	14 kt	6	44	
Grampus class	minelayer	United Kingdom	1,520 tons	2,157 tons	15 kt	6	59	
Minerve class	medium submarine	France	662 tons	856 tons	14 kt	9	41	
Narwhal-class	submarine cruiser	United States	2,730 tons	4,050 tons	17 kt	6	90	
Surcouf	submarine cruiser	France	3,250 tons	4,304 tons	18 kt	12	118	
Argonaut	minelayer	United States	2,710 tons	4,080 tons	15 kt	4	89	
S-boats	medium submarine	United States	840 tons	1,150 tons	15 kt	4	42	

== Modern boats ==
=== United Kingdom ===
Since the mid-1960s, the Royal Navy has used the term Fleet Submarine for its nuclear-powered attack submarines, distinguishing them from the ballistic missile submarines (and, in the 20th century, from the diesel-electric submarines, which it termed 'Patrol Submarines').

== Sources ==
- Alden, John D., Commander (USN Ret) (1979). The Fleet Submarine in the U.S. Navy: A Design and Construction History. London: Arms and Armour Press. ISBN 0-85368-203-8.
- Friedman, Norman (1995). U.S. Submarines Through 1945: An Illustrated Design History. Annapolis, Maryland: United States Naval Institute. ISBN 1-55750-263-3.
- Kafka, Roger; Pepperburg, Roy L. (1946). Warships of the World. New York: Cornell Maritime Press.
- le Masson, Henri (1969). Navies of the Second World War. Vol. The French Navy 1. Garden City, New York: Doubleday & Company.
- Lenton, H.T. (1968). Navies of the Second World War. Vol. Royal Netherlands Navy. Garden City, New York: Doubleday & Company.
- Lenton, H.T.; Colledge, J.J. (1964). British and Dominion Warships of World War II. Garden City, New York: Doubleday & Company.
- Potter, E.B.; Nimitz, Chester W. (1960). Sea Power. Englewood Cliffs, New Jersey: Prentice-Hall.
- Silverstone, Paul H. (1968). U.S. Warships of World War II. Garden City, New York: Doubleday & Company.
- Taylor, J.C. (1966). German Warships of World War II. Garden City, New York: Doubleday & Company.
- Watts, Anthony J. (1966). Japanese Warships of World War II. Garden City, New York: Doubleday & Company.
