= Direct-drive mechanism =

Transmission of torque from motor to output without gearing

A direct-drive mechanism is a mechanism design where the force or torque from a prime mover is transmitted directly to the effector machine (such as the drive wheels of a vehicle) without involving any intermediate couplings such as a gear train or a belt.

== History ==
In the late 19th century and early 20th century, some of the earliest locomotives and cars used direct drive transmissions at higher speeds. Direct-drive mechanisms for industrial arms began to be possible in the 1980s, with the use of rare-earth magnetic materials. The first direct-drive arm was built in 1981 at Carnegie Mellon University. Today the most commonly used magnets are neodymium magnets.

== Design ==
Direct-drive systems are characterized by smooth torque transmission, and nearly zero backlash. The main benefits of a direct-drive system are increased efficiency (due to reduced power losses from the drivetrain components) and being a simpler design with fewer moving parts. Major benefits also include the ability to deliver high torque over a wide range of speeds, fast response, precise positioning, and low inertia.

The main drawback is that a special type of electric motor is often needed to provide high torque outputs at low rpm. Compared with a multi-speed transmission, the motor usually operates in its optimal power band for a smaller range of output speeds for the system (e.g., road speeds in the case of a motor vehicle).

Direct-drive mechanisms also need a more precise control mechanism. High-speed motors with speed reduction have relatively high inertia, which helps smooth the output motion. Most motors exhibit positional torque ripple known as cogging torque. In high-speed motors, this effect is usually negligible, as the frequency at which it occurs is too high to significantly affect system performance; direct-drive units will suffer more from this phenomenon unless additional inertia is added (i.e. by a flywheel) or the system uses feedback to actively counter the effect.

== Applications ==
Direct-drive mechanisms are used in applications ranging from low speed operation (such as phonographs, telescope mounts, video game racing wheels and gearless wind turbines) to high speeds (such as fans, computer hard drives, VCR heads, sewing machines, CNC machines and washing machines.)

Some electric railway locomotives have used direct-drive mechanisms, such as the 1919 Milwaukee Road class EP-2 and the 2007 East Japan Railway Company E331. Several cars from the late 19th century used direct-drive wheel hub motors, as did some concept cars in the early 2000s; however, most modern electric cars use inboard motor(s), where drive is transferred to the wheels, via the axles.

Some automobile manufacturers have managed to create their own unique direct-drive transmissions, such as the one Christian von Koenigsegg invented for the Koenigsegg Regera.

== See also ==
- Belt drive
- Chain drive
- Direct-drive sim racing wheel
- Drive shaft
- Hubless wheel
- Linear motor
- Individual wheel drive
