= Tambor-class submarine =

US Navy submarine class of World War II

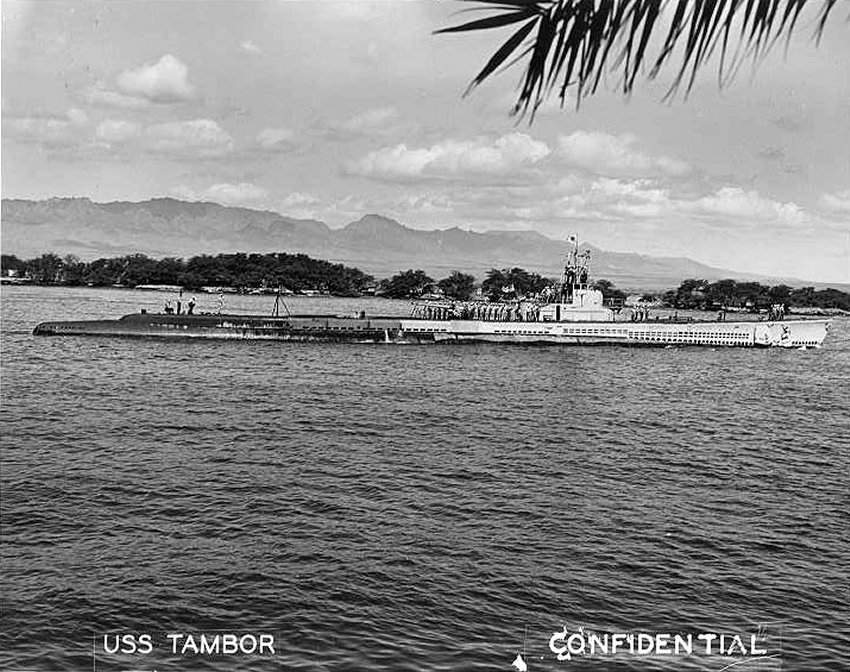
- USS Tambor (SS-198)

Class overview
- Name: Tambor class
- Builders: Electric Boat Company, Portsmouth Naval Shipyard, Mare Island Naval Shipyard
- Operators: United States Navy
- Preceded by: Sargo class
- Succeeded by: Mackerel class
- Built: 1939–1941
- In commission: 1940–1946
- Completed: 12
- Lost: 7
- Retired: 5

General characteristics
- Type: Diesel-electric submarine
- Displacement: 1,475 long tons (1,499 t) standard, surfaced; 2,370 long tons (2,410 t) submerged
- Length: 307 ft 2 in (93.62 m)
- Beam: 27 ft 3 in (8.31 m)
- Draft: 14 ft 7 1/2 in (4.458 m)
- Propulsion: 4 × diesel engines driving electrical generators (Fairbanks-Morse or General Motors); 2 × 126-cell Sargo batteries; 4 × high-speed General Electric electric motors with reduction gears; two shafts; 6,400 hp (4,800 kW) surfaced; 2,740 hp (2,040 kW) submerged
- Speed: 20.4 knots (38 km/h) surfaced; 8.75 knots (16 km/h) submerged
- Range: 11,000 nautical miles (20,000 km) at 10 knots (19 km/h)
- Endurance: 48 hours at 2 knots (3.7 km/h) submerged
- Test depth: 250–300 ft (76–91 m) Crush Depth Possible 500 ft (150 m)
- Complement: 6 officers, 54 enlisted
- Armament: 10 × 21 inch (533 mm) torpedo tubes (six forward, four aft); 24 torpedoes; 1 × 3-inch (76 mm)/50 caliber deck gun

The Tambor-class submarine was a United States Navy submarine design, used primarily during World War II. They were the USN's first fully successful fleet submarine, and began the war close to the fighting. Six of the class were in Hawaiian waters or the Central Pacific on 7 December 1941, with Tautog at Pearl Harbor during the attack. They went on to see hard service; seven of the twelve boats in the class were sunk before the survivors were withdrawn from front-line service in early 1945; this was the highest percentage lost of any US submarine class. Tautog was credited with sinking 26 ships, the second largest number of ships sunk by a US submarine in World War II. The Tambors attained the top speed of 21 knots (39 km/h) and range of 11,000 nautical miles (20,000 km) (allowing patrols in Japanese home waters) of the preceding Sargo class, and improvements included six bow torpedo tubes, a more reliable full diesel-electric propulsion plant, and improved combat efficiency with key personnel and equipment relocated to the conning tower. In some references, the Tambors are called the "T Class", and SS-206 through SS-211 are sometimes called the "Gar class".

== Design history ==
=== Preliminary designs ===
Early U.S. submarine designs of World War I assigned to escort shipping revealed that they had minimal ability to deter an aggressive threat. Despite the fact that German U-boats proved beyond a doubt that no navy could be a world sea power without submarines, the role played by U.S. submarines in the defense of the Pacific would have to be rethought by Navy planners.

Following the Armistice, and after testing the capabilities of German design via captured U-boats, the U.S. Navy began to see the potential for extended offensive submarine operations. Submarine operations with the fleet required boats with a high speed of 21 knots so that they could maneuver with the Standard-type battleships. A high endurance was also desired to enable sustained patrols in Japanese home waters, hopefully providing warning of enemy operations as well as sinking warships close to home. These qualities would later prove vital in commerce raiding during World War II, though this was largely absent from prewar planning due to the restrictions of the Washington Naval Treaty. The huge advancement in American technology required to fill that role with "a new all-purpose fleet submarine" also became apparent.

The first attempt to produce a fleet submarine was the AA-1 class, later renamed the T class, launched 1918-19. These produced a high speed with four engines clutched together in tandem pairs. This design resulted in excessive vibration and engine damage, and the class was decommissioned in the 1920s and scrapped in 1930. The second attempt was the Barracuda class; the first three V-boats, launched 1924–25. These combined large direct drive main diesels with small diesel-electric diesels to achieve 21 knots. Their engines, built by the Bureau of Steam Engineering (BuEng) based on German MAN designs, were unreliable and the boats had poor seakeeping qualities. They were decommissioned in 1937 and saw only limited service, mostly training and experimental, in World War II.

A different direction, that of a large, long-range "cruiser" submarine with moderate speed, was taken with Argonaut, Narwhal, and Nautilus, the second trio of V-boats launched 1927–30. These were influenced by German "U-cruisers" such as the Type U-139 of World War I. Up to 381 ft (116 m) overall and 2,710 long tons (2,753 t) surfaced displacement, these were the largest non-nuclear submarines ever built by the United States. They were armed with a pair of 6-inch deck guns to allow engaging armed merchant cruisers or Q-ships on the surface. However, their huge size was a disadvantage in most tactical situations. They could not dive quickly and were slow in maneuvering. They found a role inserting raiders and supplying guerrillas in World War II, famously in the Makin Island raid but also in the Philippines.

After the unsuccessful attempts outlined above, Navy designers finally worked towards a practical fleet submarine. The first successful approaches to this were the Porpoise or "P"-class and Salmon / Sargo or new "S"-class submarines, launched 1935–1939. These were smaller, more maneuverable boats than the cruiser-type V-boats. However, the "P" class was lacking in speed and their early diesel-electric propulsion was vulnerable to arcing. Although the new "S" class had a faster "composite" power plant combining direct drive and diesel-electric components, they were somewhat lacking in reliability and firepower. Some of the new "S" class were equipped with the Hooven-Owens-Rentschler double-acting diesels, which had poor reliability.

=== Tambor-class proposal ===
In the fall of 1937 a proposal for an improved fleet submarine was put forward by the team of officers put together by then-Commander Charles A. Lockwood (later Admiral and Commander Submarine Force Pacific), Lt. Cmdr. Andrew McKee, planning officer at Portsmouth Navy Yard, and Lt. Armand M. Morgan, head of the Navy's submarine design section. It was to be large (1,500 tons), and carry the latest diesel engines, ten torpedo tubes, a 5-inch (127 mm) gun, and an updated Torpedo Data Computer. Habitability would be increased by the addition of fresh water distillation units and air conditioning.

However, the design concepts faced opposition from Admiral Thomas Hart, Chairman of the General Board. Hart stubbornly defended the building of small, coastal defense boats (without "luxuries" like air conditioning, whose primary function was not comfort but the elimination of prevalent electrical shorts). Through determination and skilled political maneuvering, the design of Lockwood's team prevailed (though Hart would consent to only a 3-inch (76 mm) gun). As with other classes, the small gun was to prevent submarines from attempting to engage heavily armed escorts on the surface. This design was finally adopted by the Navy's General Board and the Submarine Officers' Conference for the 1939 program.

=== Design specifications ===
The Tambors had several key improvements over the Sargo class. For the first time in a US submarine, six bow torpedo tubes were equipped. This had been delayed for several years due to an overestimate of the tonnage required for the two extra tubes. The four stern tubes of the Sargos were retained. Larger torpedo rooms eliminated the deck stowage of torpedoes on previous classes, which was abandoned during World War II in any case. Combat efficiency was improved by relocating the sonar operators and the Torpedo Data Computer into an enlarged conning tower to enable direct communication with the captain, and a new periscope with a small head to avoid detection was equipped. The "negative tank" or "down express" tank found on some World War I-era S-boats was revived; this could be quickly flooded when diving to provide negative buoyancy and get the submarine under water more quickly. The hull had improved streamlining for a higher cruising speed.

The full diesel-electric propulsion plant found in a few Sargos was continued, and probably improvements over the Porpoise class eliminated the arcing that had plagued those boats. The "new S-class" had boats with either General Motors-Winton engines or Hooven-Owens-Rentschler (HOR) engines. The HOR engines proved very unreliable, and were replaced by early 1943. The non-GM engine selected was the Fairbanks-Morse 38 8-1/8 engine. Still used as backup power on nuclear submarines, this was one of the best submarine engines ever. The Tambors were lucky; twelve of the subsequent Gato-class boats were initially equipped with HORs, apparently to speed up production.

The Tambors had a significant weakness: all four engines were in one compartment, making the boat very vulnerable to damage. This was corrected in the Gato class, whose test depth was also increased from 250 ft (76 m) to 300 ft (91 m), based on testing of depth charges against Tambor.

=== Torpedoes ===
At the beginning of World War II the standard torpedo for US fleet submarines was the 21-inch, Mark 14 torpedo. Due to a shortage of this torpedo, several substitutions were authorized, including using the shorter Bliss-Leavitt Mark 9 torpedo and Mark 10 torpedo, and the surface-fired Bliss–Leavitt Mark 8 torpedo, Mark 11 torpedo, Mark 12 torpedo, and Mark 15 torpedo. The surface-fired torpedoes required minor modifications. Due to their excessive length, marks 11, 12, and 15 torpedoes were limited to the aft torpedo tubes only. As torpedo production ramped up and the bugs were worked out of the Mark 14, substitutions were less common. As the war progressed, the Navy introduced the electric wakeless Mark 18 Torpedo and the Mark 23 torpedo, a simplified high-speed-only version of the Mark 14. Additionally, a small 19" swim-out acoustic homing Mark 27 torpedo supplemented the armament in fleet boats for defense against escorts. Near the end of the war, the offensive Mark 28 torpedo acoustic homing torpedo was introduced.

==== Deck Guns ====
Although the Tambors were initially equipped with a 3-inch (76 mm)/50 caliber deck gun, Lockwood and the Submarine Officers' Conference prevailed upon Admiral Hart to allow a supporting deck strengthened to accommodate a 5-inch (127 mm)/51 caliber gun if experience warranted this. In 1942–43, four Tambors: SS-198, SS-199, SS-200 (which was the first one to be so modified, with USS Bonita's gun), SS-203, and two Gars: SS-206, SS-209, were rearmed with the 5-inch/51 guns. All pieces were taken from the Barracuda class or spares for that class, as they were the only class with a submarine "wet mount" for that gun. As with many other submarines that started the war with the 3"/50, the remaining Tambors received 4-inch (102 mm)/50 caliber guns removed from old S-boats that were being withdrawn from combat service.

==== Mine armament ====
The Tambor class could substitute mines in place of torpedoes. For the Mk 10 and Mk 12 type mines used in World War II, each torpedo could be replaced by as many as two mines, giving the submarine a true maximum capacity of 48 mines. However, doctrine was to retain at least four torpedoes on mine laying missions, which would limit the capacity to 40 mines, and this is often stated as the maximum in various publications. In practice during the war, submarines went out with at least 8 torpedoes, and the largest minefields laid were 32 mines. Post-war, the Mk 49 mine replaced the Mk 12, while the larger Mk 27 mine was also carried which only allowed one mine replacing one torpedo. This mine could be set to travel 1000 to 5000 yards from the sub before deploying. (not to be confused with the Mk 27 homing torpedo)

== Service ==
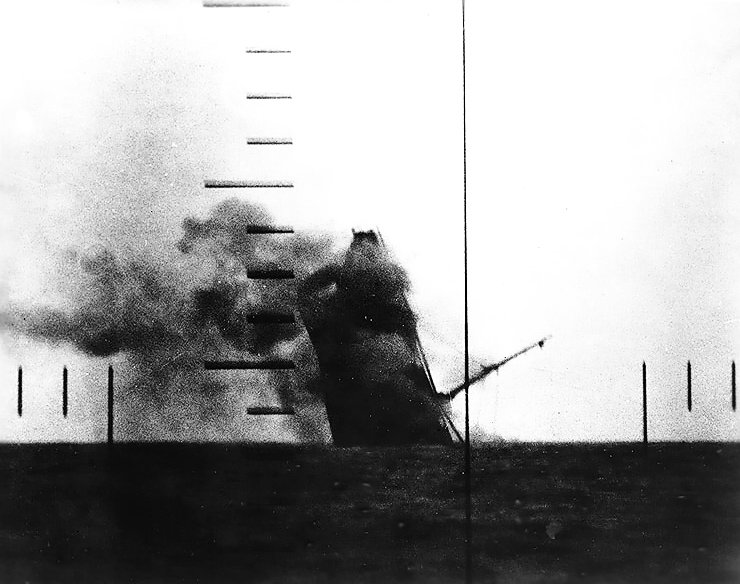
Periscope photo of a Japanese merchant ship sinking.

Six Tambors were in Hawaiian waters or the Central Pacific on 7 December 1941, with Tautog at Pearl Harbor during the attack. The remainder of the class was in the continental United States, recently commissioned or on trials. The bulk of the available submarines in the Pacific (not including any Tambors) had been forward deployed to the Philippines in October 1941. The Tambors went on to see hard service; seven of the twelve boats in the class were sunk before the survivors were withdrawn from front-line service for training and experimental duties in early 1945; this was the highest percentage lost of any US submarine class. Tautog was credited with sinking 26 ships, the second largest number of ships sunk by a US submarine in World War II. Postwar, Tuna was a target in the Operation Crossroads nuclear weapons tests at Bikini Atoll in 1946, but was only lightly damaged. She was later expended as a target in 1948.

== Boats in class ==
Construction data
Name	Hull no.	Builder	Laid down	Launched	Commissioned	Fate
Tambor	SS-198	Electric Boat, Groton, Connecticut	16 January 1939	20 December 1939	3 June 1940	Decommissioned 10 December 1945. Reserve training ship postwar; sold for scrap 1 September 1959.
Tautog	SS-199	Electric Boat, Groton, Connecticut	1 March 1939	27 January 1940	3 July 1940	Decommissioned 8 December 1945. Reserve training ship postwar; sold for scrap 15 November 1959, to the Bultema Dock and Dredge Company of Manistee, Michigan.
Thresher	SS-200	Electric Boat, Groton, Connecticut	27 April 1939	27 March 1940	27 August 1940	Decommissioned 13 December 1945. Sold for scrap 18 March 1948 to Max Siegel of Everett, Massachusetts.
Triton	SS-201	Portsmouth Navy Yard, Kittery, Maine	5 July 1939	25 March 1940	15 August 1940	Lost to attack by three destroyers 20 March 1943.
Trout	SS-202	Portsmouth Navy Yard, Kittery, Maine	8 August 1939	21 May 1940	15 November 1940	Lost around 29 February 1944, probably to enemy action.
Tuna	SS-203	Mare Island Navy Yard, Vallejo, California	19 July 1939	2 October 1940	2 January 1941	Decommissioned on 11 December 1946. Expended as target 24 September 1948.

The last six of the Tambor class are often listed as "Gar-class" submarines. They were ordered in fiscal year 1940 (FY40); the previous six were ordered in FY39, and some design differences were anticipated. On 17 December 1938, the secretary of the navy decided that the FY40 class would duplicate the FY39 class. However, design collapse depth was increased from 450 feet (140 m) to 500 feet (150 m), with test depth remaining at 250 feet (76 m).

Construction data (Gar-class)
Name	Hull no.	Builder	Laid down	Launched	Commissioned	Fate
Gar	SS-206	Electric Boat, Groton, Connecticut	27 December 1939	27 November 1940	14 April 1941	Decommissioned on 11 December 1945. Reserve training ship postwar; sold for scrap 18 November 1959 to Acme Scrap Iron and Metal Company.
Grampus	SS-207	Electric Boat, Groton, Connecticut	14 February 1940	23 December 1940	23 May 1941	Lost 5 March 1943, probably to enemy action.
Grayback	SS-208	Electric Boat, Groton, Connecticut	3 April 1940	31 January 1941	30 June 1941	Lost to enemy action 27 February 1944.
Grayling	SS-209	Portsmouth Navy Yard, Kittery, Maine	15 December 1939	29 November 1940	1 March 1941	Lost between 9 and 12 September 1943, to accident or enemy action.
Grenadier	SS-210	Portsmouth Navy Yard, Kittery, Maine	2 April 1940	29 November 1940	1 May 1941	Scuttled following enemy action 22 April 1943.
Gudgeon	SS-211	Mare Island Navy Yard, Vallejo, California	22 November 1939	25 January 1941	21 April 1941	Lost between 7 April and 7 June 1944, to accident or enemy action.

== See also ==
- List of most successful American submarines in World War II
- Allied submarines in the Pacific War
- Fleet submarine
- Unrestricted submarine warfare
- Torpedo
- List of submarine classes of the United States Navy
- List of lost United States submarines
- List of submarines of the Second World War
