= Frederick Warder =

Frederick Warder may refer to:

- Frederick B. Warder (1904–2000) American naval officer
- Frederick L. Warder (1912–1980), American politician from New York
