= Japanese oiler Tōhō Maru =

Tōhō Maru may refer to:

- Japanese oiler Tōhō Maru (1936), launched in 1936 and sunk in 1943
- Japanese oiler Tōhō Maru (1944), launched in 1944 and sunk in 1945
