= USS Swordfish (SS-193) =

Sargo-class submarine

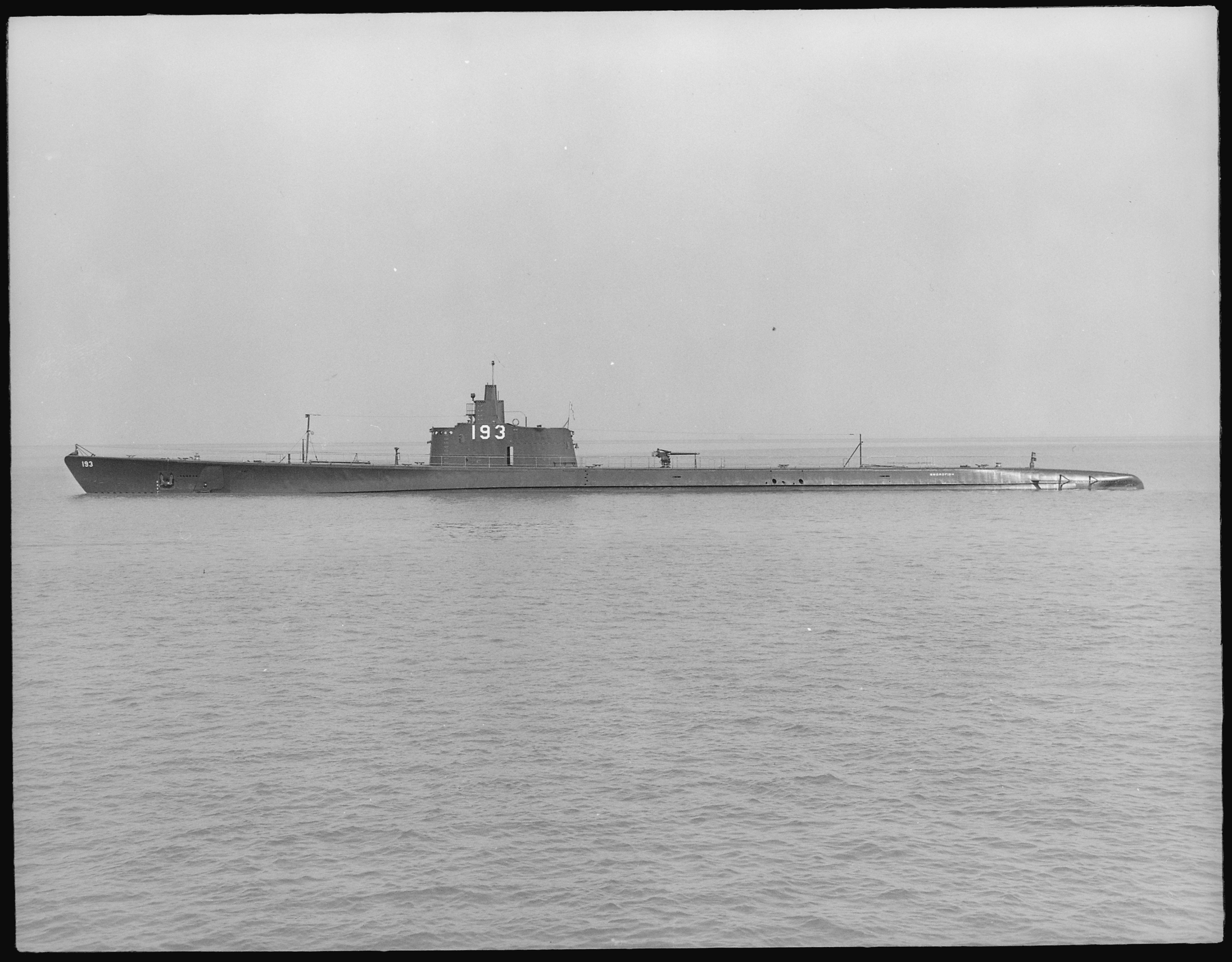
- Swordfish in 1939

History

United States
- Builder: Mare Island Naval Shipyard, Vallejo, California
- Laid down: 27 October 1937
- Launched: 1 April 1939
- Sponsored by: Miss Louise Shaw Hepburn
- Commissioned: 22 July 1939
- Stricken: 19 May 1945
- Fate: Probably sunk by Japanese vessels in the Ryukyu Islands, 12 January 1945

General characteristics
- Class & type: Sargo-class submarine
- Displacement: 1,450 long tons (1,470 t) standard, surfaced; 2,350 long tons (2,390 t) submerged
- Length: 310 ft 6 in (94.64 m)
- Beam: 26 ft 10 in (8.18 m)
- Draft: 16 ft 7 1/2 in (5.067 m)
- Propulsion: 4 × General Motors Model 16-248 V16 diesel engines; 2 × 126-cell Sargo batteries; 4 × high-speed General Electric electric motors with reduction gears; two shafts; 5,500 shp (4.1 MW) surfaced; 2,740 shp (2.0 MW) submerged
- Speed: 21 knots (39 km/h) surfaced; 8.75 knots (16 km/h) submerged
- Range: 11,000 nautical miles (20,000 km) at 10 knots (19 km/h)
- Endurance: 48 hours at 2 knots (3.7 km/h) submerged
- Test depth: 250 ft (76 m)
- Complement: 5 officers, 54 enlisted
- Armament: 8 × 21 inch (533 mm) torpedo tubes; (four forward, four aft); 24 torpedoes; 1 × 3 in (76 mm) / 50 caliber deck gun; four machine guns

USS Swordfish (SS-193), a Sargo-class submarine, was the first submarine of the United States Navy named for the swordfish, a large fish with a long, swordlike beak and a high dorsal fin. She was the first American submarine to sink a Japanese ship during World War II.

== Construction and commissioning ==
Swordfish′s keel was laid down on 27 October 1937 by the Mare Island Navy Yard at Vallejo, California. She was launched on 3 April 1939 sponsored by Miss Louise Shaw Hepburn, and commissioned on 22 July 1939 with Lieutenant (later Rear Admiral) Chester C. Smith in command.

== Operational history ==
=== 1937–1941 ===
Following shakedown and post-shakedown repairs at Mare Island, Swordfish operated out of San Diego, California, until early 1941, when she set sail for Pearl Harbor. On 3 November Swordfish, in company with three other U.S. submarines, under the command of Cdr. Keats Edmund Montross, she departed Pearl, and on 22 November arrived at Manila, Philippine Islands. The submarine remained at Manila until the Japanese attack on Pearl Harbor on 7 December 1941. The following day, she set sail on her first war patrol, conducted off the coast of Hainan, China. After damaging several enemy vessels on the 9th, 11th, and 14th (Kashii Maru), Swordfish sank her initial victim of the war on 16 December. Hit amidships by one of three torpedoes, the cargo ship Atsutasan Maru erupted in a cloud of smoke and flames and disappeared beneath the waves. On 27 December Swordfish embarked the organizational staff of the Submarine Asiatic Command Staff at Manila and headed for Soerabaja, Java, arriving on 7 January 1942.

=== 1942 ===
Swordfish departed Soerabaja on 16 January for her second war patrol, conducted in the Celebes Sea and in the Philippines. On 24 January, she torpedoed and sank the cargo ship Myoken Maru (4,124 tons) off Kema, Celebes Islands. On 20 February, she submerged in the entrance of Mariveles, Luzon, only to surface after dark to take on board the President of the Philippines Manuel L. Quezon, his family, Vice President of the Philippines Sergio Osmeña, Chief Justice of the Philippines José Abad Santos, and three Philippine Army officers. She departed on the surface about 11:30pm and sailed through a minefield. She submerged during the day of 21 February, between 06:20 and 18:20 which caused it to be quite warm, 94F and 92% humidity. She arrived off the coast of San Jose, Panay, Philippine Islands on 22 February at 10pm and they stopped at 2:30am on 23 February about a mile off the coast of San Jose de Buenavista, Antique. Fifteen minutes later they were advised that their launch was approaching. The passengers debarked the sub around 3am on 23 February. The President and his party were transferred to a motor tender. Swordfish then returned to Manila Bay and embarked the High Commissioner of the Philippines, arriving Fremantle, Western Australia, on 9 March.

Swordfish got underway from Fremantle on 1 April for her third war patrol, with her primary mission being to deliver 40 tons of provisions to the besieged island of Corregidor. The island fell to the Japanese before the mission could be carried out and the submarine was ordered to patrol in the vicinity of Ambon Island. The only ships sighted were beyond effective range, and the submarine returned to Fremantle on 1 May.

Departing Fremantle for her fourth war patrol on 15 May, Swordfish was in the Makassar Strait on 23 May when she damaged the Asakaze Maru; in the South China Sea on 29 May where she sank a 1900-ton transport ship Tatsufuku Maru and was in the Gulf of Siam on 12 June, where she torpedoed and sank a 4585-ton cargo ship Burma Maru. The submarine returned to Fremantle on 4 July.

Her fifth war patrol, conducted in the Sulu Sea, and her sixth war patrol, conducted in the Solomon Islands, were unproductive. During her sixth patrol, she possibly was involved in an accidental "friendly fire" attack in Misima Island harbor on HMAS Fauro Chief, which was damaged on 12 November 1942. She was involved in another friendly fire incident at 02:30 on 26 November 1942, when a United States Army Air Forces North American B-25 Mitchell bomber mistook Swordfish for a Japanese submarine and attacked her while she was on the surface off Cape Ward Hunt, New Guinea. She crash-dived, and had reached a depth of 120 feet (37 m) when four bombs detonated across her stern, inflicting no damage or casualties.

=== 1943 ===
On her seventh war patrol, Swordfish sank the 4,122-ton cargo ship Myoho Maru on 19 January 1943. She again was the target of a friendly fire incident when at 09:25 on 7 February 1943 what her crew identified as a U.S. Army Air Forces B-17 Flying Fortress bomber mistakenly attacked her while she was on the surface 240 nautical miles (444 km; 276 mi) north-northeast of Kavieng, New Ireland, at 00°12′N 152°00′E. Her crew heard machine-gun bullets striking her conning tower as she crash-dived, followed by an explosion, and she descended to a depth of 170 feet (52 m) before her crew regained control of her and stabilized her at a depth of 90 feet (27 m). Her damage was significant enough to force her to terminate her patrol early and head to Pearl Harbor for repairs. Returning to Pearl Harbor on 23 February 1943, she underwent overhaul.

On 29 July 1943, Swordfish got underway from Pearl Harbor for her eighth war patrol. On 22 August 1943, she sighted her first target of the patrol, and quickly sent the 3,016-ton cargo ship Nishiyama Maru to the bottom, the victim of two torpedo hits. She intercepted a Japanese convoy on 5 September 1943 and damaged a large tanker before sinking a 3,203-ton transport ship Tenkai Maru. She concluded the patrol at Brisbane, Australia, on 20 September.

Swordfish's ninth war patrol lasted only three weeks. Shortly after reaching her assigned patrol area, her crew discovered material defects, and she had to return to port.

=== 1944 ===
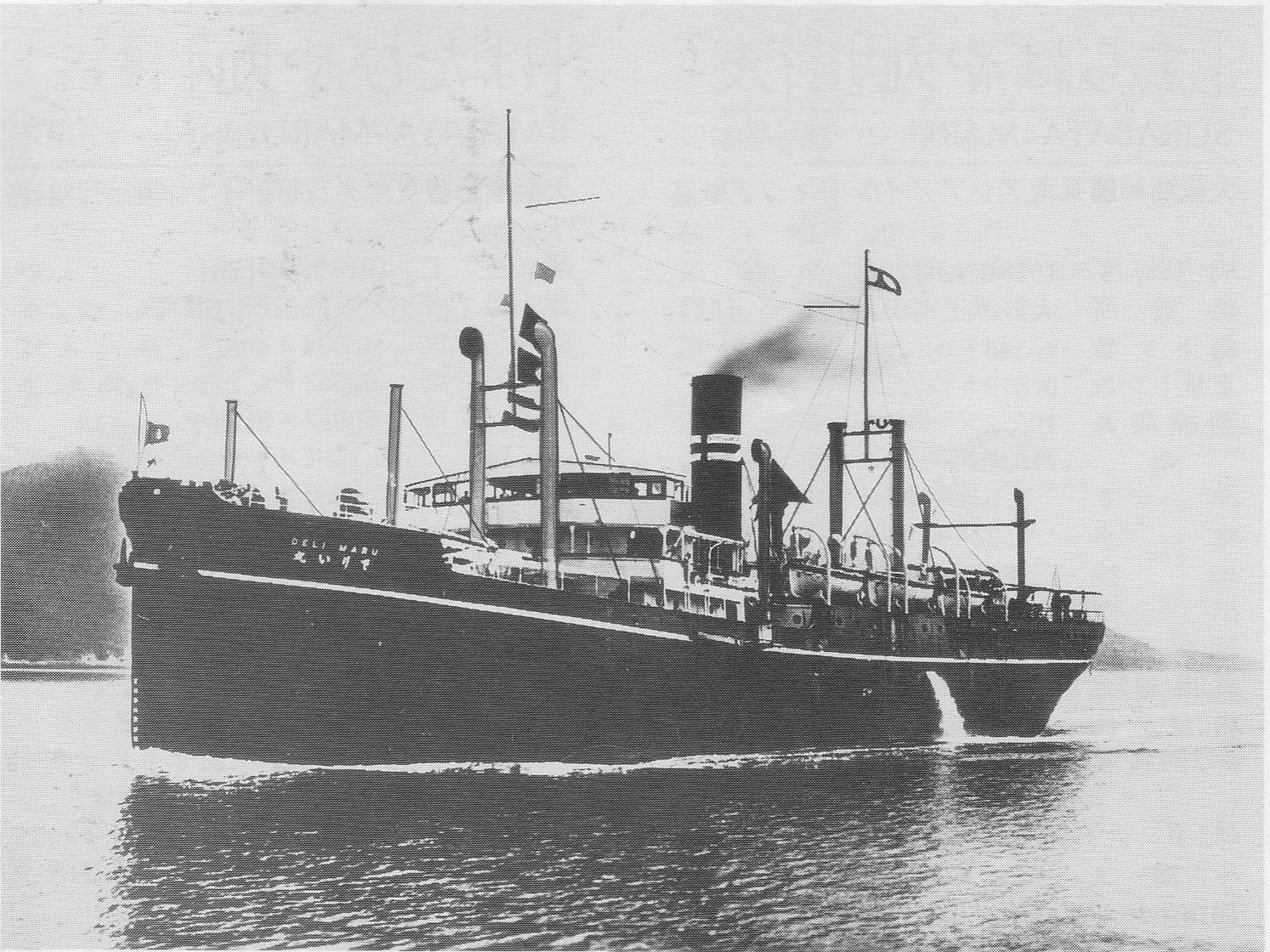
Delhi Maru

On the day after Christmas 1943, Swordfish departed for her tenth war patrol, in the hands of one of the Submarine Force's oldest commanders, 42-year-old Karl G. Hensel (Class of 1923), formerly commanding Submarine Division 101. The patrol was conducted in Tokyo Bay. It was plagued with equipment casualties in old Swordfish, including radar trouble and electrical fires. On 13 January 1944, she sank 6921-ton freighter Yamakuni Maru, while surviving "heavy—and close—depth charges". The depth charging caused her to lose power in her electrical systems, and when she dived at dawn the next day, she suffered two separate fires and nearly went right to the bottom; her captain managed to bring her back up, where she wallowed on the surface, only to have a Japanese patrol boat close on her. She regained power in the nick of time and dived. At around 2200 on 14 January, Swordfish detected another ship, and made radar contact at 7 nmi (8.1 mi; 13 km) on the Japanese navy's first genuine Q-ship, the 2182-ton merchantman Delhi Maru, on her maiden voyage. She had been outfitted with sonar (which Swordfish had heard pinging), new watertight bulkheads, depth charge throwers, and concealed guns, specially to destroy submarines. At midnight, Swordfish fired three bow torpedo tubes, scoring three hits with the recently corrected Mark XIV torpedo. Delhi Maru blew up, and the two patrol boats of her escort kept Swordfish down with depth charges for three hours before she evaded.

17 January, Swordfish was detailed to intercept Shōkaku and her escort. In the dark, it was impossible to see the carrier, but radar made contact on the force at 16,000 yards (15,000 m) (8 nmi (9.2 mi)), making 27 kn (31 mph; 50 km/h). To avoid being detected, Swordfish dived, only to end up 2,000 yards (1,800 m) in front of one of Shōkaku's escorting destroyers, which practically ran right over her. Shōkaku came on so fast, Swordfish could barely get off a shot from her four stern tubes, with the carrier going away; all missed. On 27 January, Swordfish fired two torpedoes at a 3140-ton auxiliary gunboat Kasagi Maru which broke in half and sank. She completed her tenth patrol at Pearl Harbor on 7 February. Her total score was claimed to be two ships for 15,200 tons; the tonnage was reduced by JANAC to 12,543 tons postwar, but the number of ships was raised to three.

Swordfish put to sea on 13 March for her eleventh war patrol, conducted in the Mariana Islands. Although several enemy ships were damaged during this patrol, no sinkings could be confirmed; and the submarine returned to Majuro on 29 April.

Swordfish's twelfth war patrol was conducted in the area of the Bonin Islands. On 9 June, the submarine found Japanese destroyer Matsukaze clearly illuminated against the horizon and sank the enemy ship with two torpedoes from her bow tubes. On 15 June, she torpedoed and sank a 4804-ton transport ship Kanseishi Maru. The remainder of the patrol was unproductive; on 27 June the Swordfish heavily damaged two enemy trawlers near Chici Jima and on 30 June sank or heavily damaged a Japanese picket boat in the Northern Pacific, and the submarine terminated her twelfth patrol at Pearl Harbor on 30 June.

On 22 December, Swordfish departed Pearl Harbor to conduct her thirteenth war patrol, in the vicinity of Nansei Shoto. She topped off with fuel at Midway Atoll in the Northwestern Hawaiian Islands on 26 December and left that day for her area. In addition to her regular patrol, Swordfish was to conduct photographic reconnaissance of Okinawa, for preparation for the upcoming Okinawa campaign.

=== 1945 ===
On 2 January, Swordfish was ordered to delay carrying out her assigned tasks in order to keep her clear of the Nansei Shoto area until completion of carrier-based air strikes which were scheduled. She was directed to patrol the general vicinity of 30°N 132°E until further orders were received. Her acknowledgement of those orders on 3 January was the last communication received from Swordfish.

On 9 January 1945, Swordfish was directed to proceed to the vicinity of Okinawa to carry out her special mission. It was estimated that the task would not take more than seven days after arrival on station, which she should have reached on 11 January. Upon completion of her mission, Swordfish was to proceed to Saipan, or to Midway if she was unable to transmit by radio. Since neither place had seen her by 15 February, and repeated attempts to raise her by radio had failed, she was reported as presumed lost on that date.

In the report of her loss, mention was made that Kete (SS-369), which at the time was patrolling the vicinity of Okinawa, reported that on the morning of 12 January she contacted a submarine by radar. It was believed that contact was with Swordfish. Four hours later Kete heard heavy depth charging from this area, and it was believed that this attack might have been the cause of Swordfish's loss.

Japanese information on antisubmarine attacks does not mention the attack heard by Kete on 12 January, and records no attacks in which Swordfish is likely to have been the victim. However, it is now known that there were many mines planted around Okinawa, since the Japanese were expecting an Allied invasion of that island. The majority of the mines were planted close in. It is considered about equally likely that Swordfish was sunk by depth charge attack before she reached Okinawa for her special mission or that she was lost to a mine at that place. Japanese sources sometimes credit her with sinking Shoto Maru on 4 January and being sunk in return by her escort, Kaibokan CD-4, since no claims for Shoto Maru match her sinking time.

Admiral William S. Pye's son, Lieutenant Commander John Briscoe Pye, was among those lost with Swordfish on her 13th and final war patrol.

== Honors and awards ==
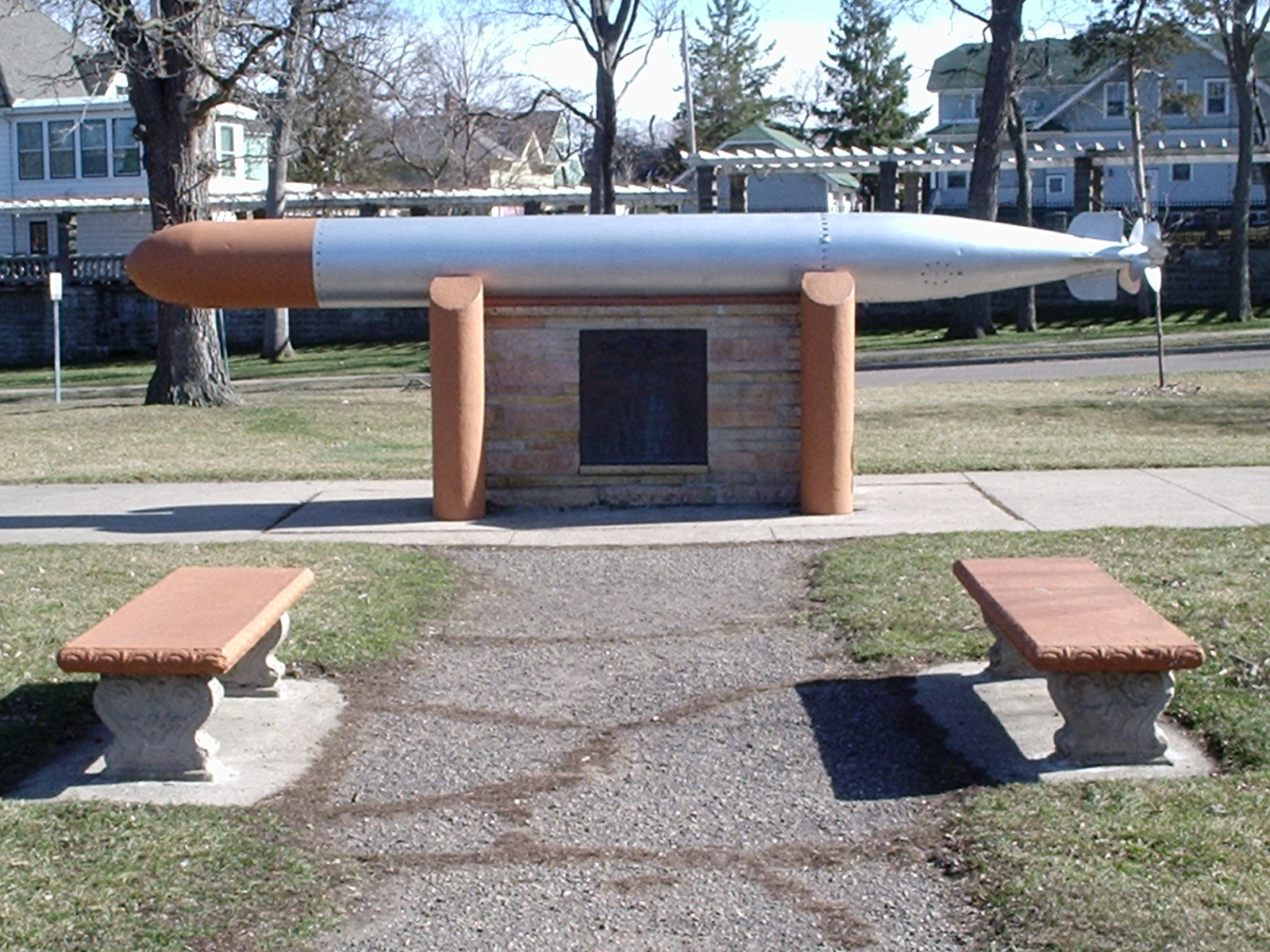
Swordfish Memorial at Como Park, St. Paul, Minnesota

- Navy Unit Commendation for the period of her first, second, and fourth war patrols
- Asiatic-Pacific Campaign Medal with eight battle stars for World War II service

== Commemoration ==
A memorial to Swordfish exists in St. Paul, Minnesota, near the Como Park Zoo and Conservatory, just off Churchill Street on a rise a short walk south of Hamm Falls. It consists of a torpedo on a stand. On one side of the base is a plaque listing the names of her crew and giving a brief history of the vessel. On the other is a roll of U.S. submarines lost in World War II.
