= USS Seawolf (SS-197) =

Submarine of the United States

Coordinates: 2°32′N 129°18′E

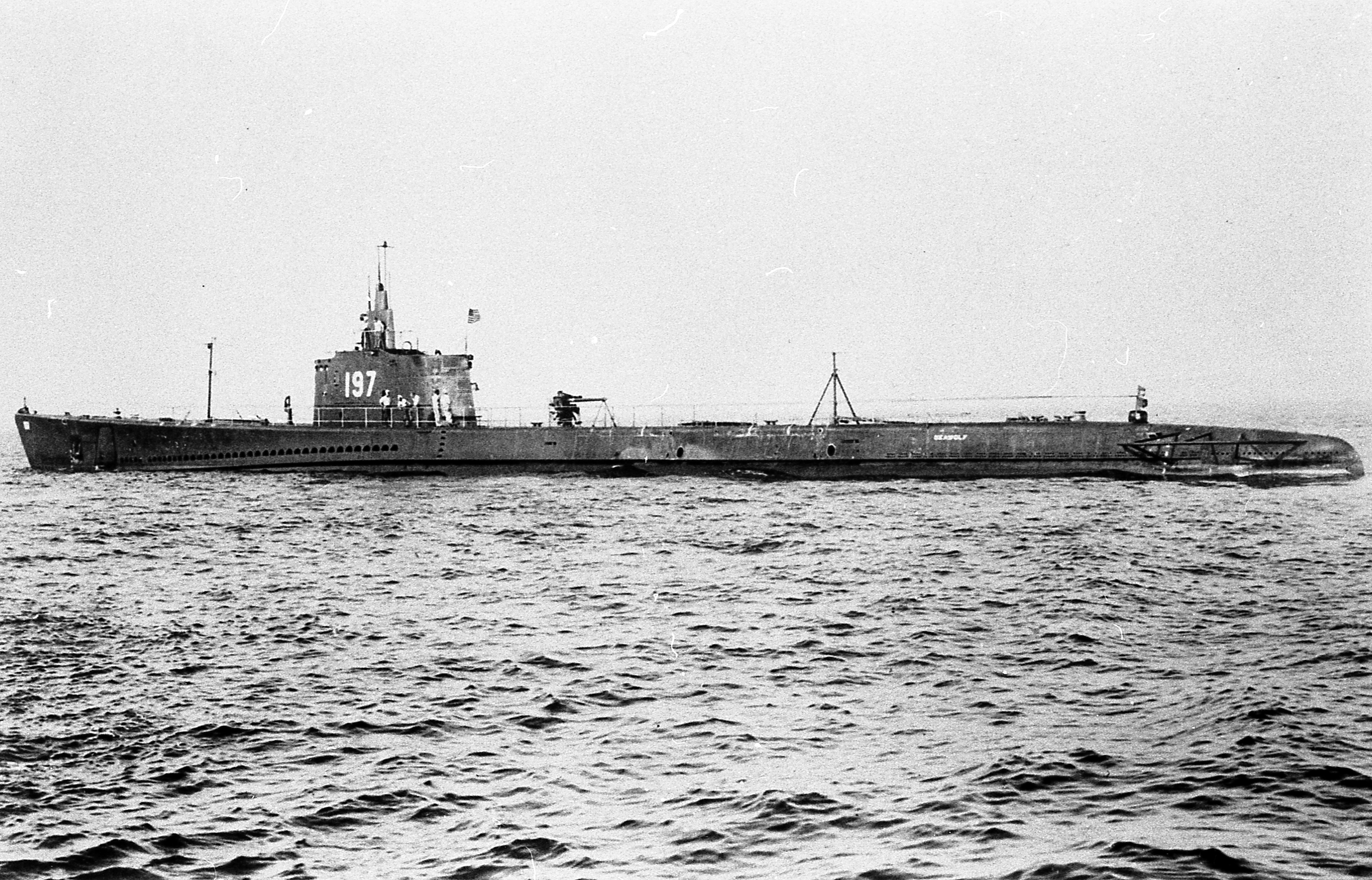
- Seawolf underway

History

United States
- Name: Seawolf
- Namesake: Atlantic wolffish
- Builder: Portsmouth Naval Shipyard, Kittery, Maine
- Laid down: 27 September 1938
- Launched: 15 August 1939
- Commissioned: 1 December 1939
- Stricken: 20 January 1945
- Fate: Probably sunk by friendly fire from USS Richard M. Rowell off Morotai on 3 October 1944

General characteristics
- Class & type: Sargo-class diesel-electric submarine
- Displacement: 1,450 long tons (1,470 t) standard, surfaced, 2,350 long tons (2,390 t) submerged
- Length: 310 ft 6 in (94.64 m)
- Beam: 26 ft 10 in (8.18 m)
- Draft: 16 ft 7 1/2 in (5.067 m)
- Propulsion: 4 × General Motors Model 16-248 V16 diesel engines driving electrical generators, 2 × 126-cell Sargo batteries, 4 × high-speed General Electric electric motors with reduction gears, two shafts, 5,400 shp (4,000 kW) surfaced, 2,740 shp (2,040 kW) submerged
- Speed: 21 knots (39 km/h) surfaced, 8.75 knots (16 km/h) submerged
- Range: 11,000 nautical miles (20,000 km) at 10 knots (19 km/h)
- Endurance: 48 hours at 2 knots (3.7 km/h) submerged
- Test depth: 250 ft (76 m)
- Complement: 5 officers, 54 enlisted
- Armament: 8 × 21 in (533 mm) torpedo tubes (four forward, four aft; 24 torpedoes ({Mark 14s as designed, mixed with Mark 10s or mines during World War Two}), 1 × 3 in (76 mm)/50 cal deck gun, 4 × machine guns

USS Seawolf (SS-197), a Sargo-class submarine, was the second submarine of the United States Navy named for the seawolf.

== Construction and commissioning ==
Seawolf′s keel was laid down on 27 September 1938 by the Portsmouth Navy Yard in Kittery, Maine. She was launched on 15 August 1939, sponsored by Mrs. Syria Florence Kalbfus, wife of Admiral Edward C. Kalbfus, and commissioned on 1 December 1939, Lieutenant Frederick B. Warder in command.

== Service history ==
=== Inter-war period ===
After fitting out, Seawolf departed Portsmouth, New Hampshire on 12 April 1940 for her shakedown cruise, which lasted until 21 June and took her as far south as the Panama Canal Zone. Seawolf was next assigned to the Pacific Fleet, home ported at San Diego. In Autumn 1940, she proceeded to Manila Bay and operated from the Cavite Navy Yard.

=== World War II ===
==== First through fourth war patrols ====
When war with Japan began, the submarine readied for sea and was on her first war patrol from 8–26 December 1941.

Seawolf hunted Japanese shipping off San Bernardino Strait. On 14 December, she fired a spread of torpedoes at Sanyo Maru in Port San Vicente. One torpedo hit, but did not explode. She promptly underwent her first depth charge attack but suffered no damage.

Seawolf departed Manila on 31 December 1941 for Australia and arrived at Darwin on 9 January 1942. She loaded 30–40 tons of .50 cal (12.7 mm) antiaircraft ammunition for use by American forces on Corregidor and sailed for Manila Bay on 16 January. The submarine sighted seven Japanese freighters accompanied by four destroyers and a cruiser on 21 January, but had no opportunity to fire any of the eight torpedoes that she had aboard. The ammunition was unloaded on 28–29 January at Corregidor.

Seawolf then left Corregidor with sixteen torpedoes, submarine spare parts, and 25 passengers, that included a British intelligence officer, 12 Army pilots, 11 Navy pilots, and a yeoman.

Seawolf sailed out of Surabaya on 15 February and began patrolling in the Java Sea-Lombok Strait area. On 19 February, she fired four torpedoes at two Japanese freighter-transports in the Badung Strait. Damage to one was not ascertained, but the other was reported last seen down by the stern and listing to starboard. (However, Sagami Maru had been damaged by USAAF air attack, not by Seawolf's torpedo.)

A week later, she fired her stern tubes at a freighter and watched one hit forward of the bridge before going deep to evade depth charges from an escorting destroyer at which she had also fired. In March, Seawolf was hunting between Java and Christmas Island. On 1 April, she stealthily approached the anchorage at Christmas Island where the Japanese invasion force lay at anchor. Seawolf fired a spread at Naka. Though Seawolf was credited with a sinking at the time, only one torpedo hit, causing significant damage to the ship, although not harming any of the crew. Naka was forced to return to Japan for repairs and was out of the war for almost a year. Unaware she had hit her target, Seawolf then underwent 7 1/2 hours of depth charge attacks. On 1 April, she attacked two cruisers. A violent explosion was heard, but no flames were seen. Seawolf ended her patrol on 7 April at Fremantle and received the Navy Unit Commendation.

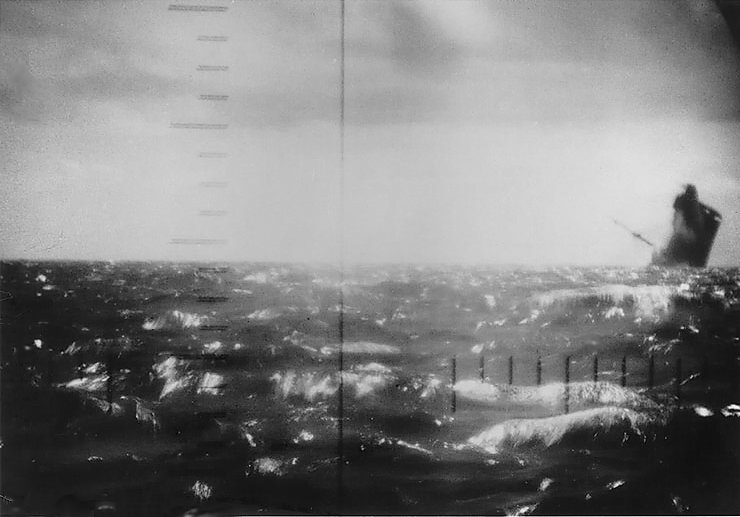
Periscope photograph of a sinking Japanese ship, torpedoed by Seawolf during a war patrol in the Philippines-East Indies area in the fall of 1942. This may be Gifu Maru, sunk on 2 November 1942 in Davao Gulf, Mindanao

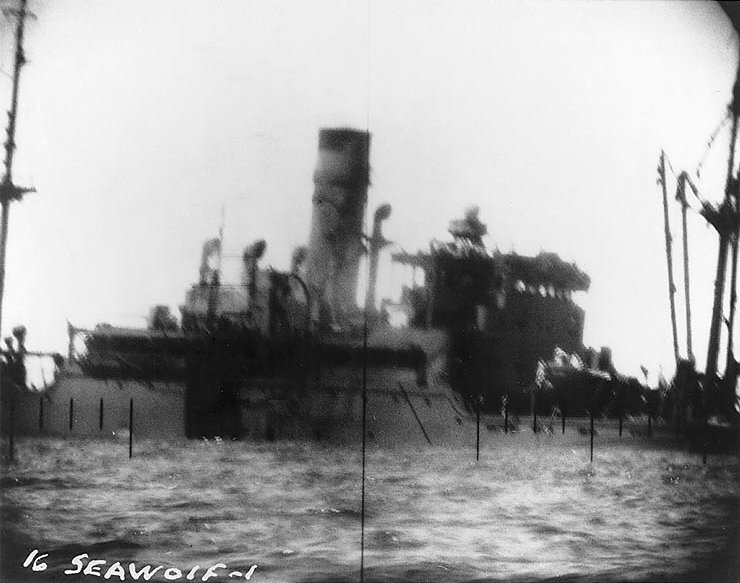
Periscope photograph of a sinking Japanese ship, torpedoed by Seawolf in the Philippines-East Indies area during the fall of 1942. This ship carries at least one landing craft forward, has a searchlight above her pilothouse and a gun mounted at the aft end of the midships superstructure. Her general configuration resembles Gifu Maru, sunk on 2 November 1942, but she could also be Keiko Maru, sunk on 8 November. Note the boat hanging from one davit amidships, as crewmen attempt to lower another boat further forward.

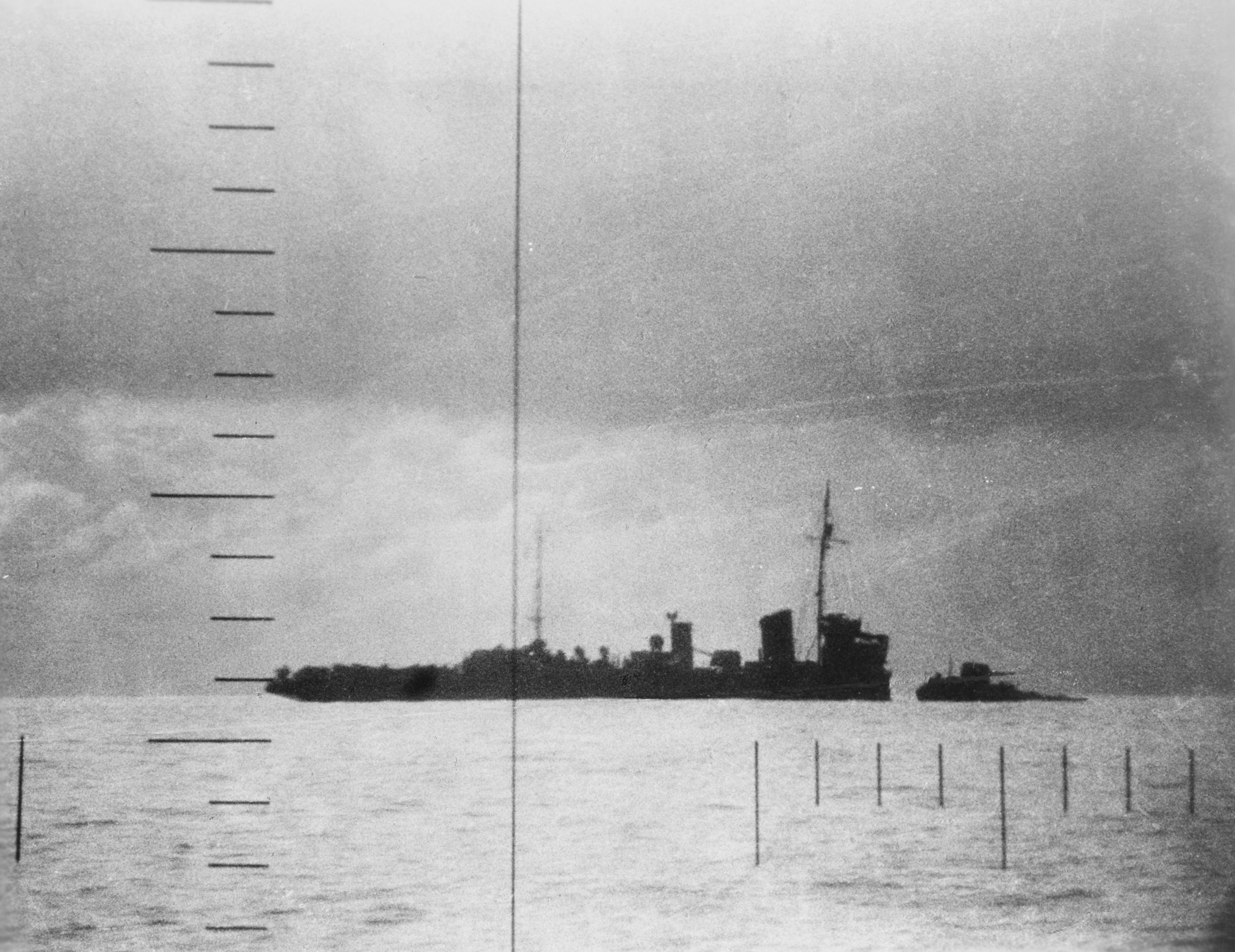
Periscope photo of Patrol Boat #39 (Japanese escort vessel, originally the destroyer Tade, 1922) sinking after being torpedoed by Seawolf on 23 April 1943.

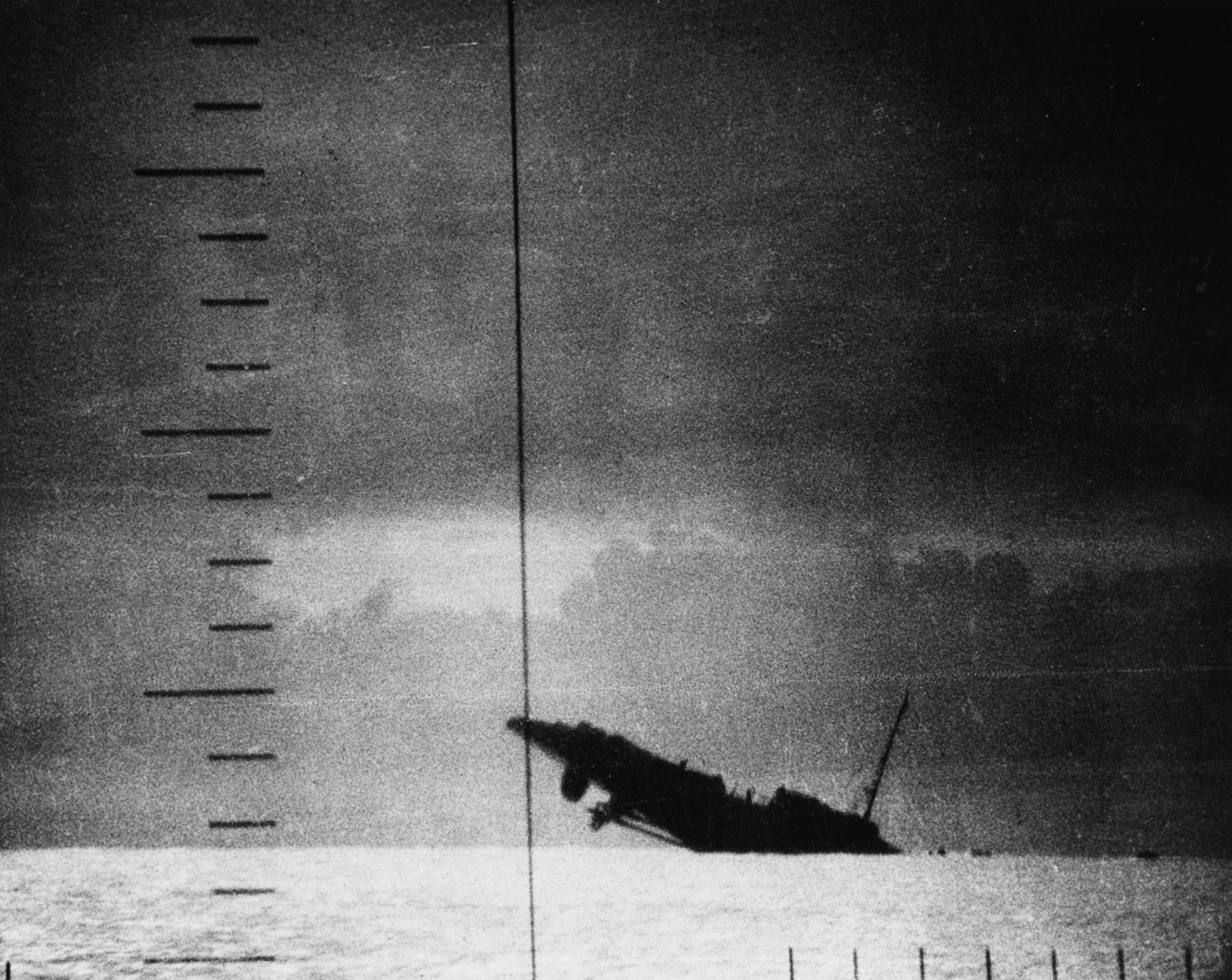
Patrol Boat No. 39 (ex-Tade)

==== Fifth through tenth war patrols ====
On her fifth patrol, from 12 May until 2 July (a total of 51 days at sea), Seawolf patrolled the Philippine Islands area. She attacked freighters on 20 May, 23 May, 12 June, 13 June, 15 June, and 28 June. On 13 June, she fired at two ships and her crew heard four explosions, but no sinkings were confirmed. Seawolf returned to Fremantle for three weeks before beginning her sixth war patrol.

Seawolf prowled the Sulu Sea and Celebes Sea from 25 July – 15 September. She attacked a tanker on 3 August, sank Hachigen Maru on 14 August and Showa Maru eleven days later. She returned to Fremantle to refit and then hunted in the Davao Gulf area from 7 October–1 December. Seawolf sank Gifu Maru on 2 November, Sagami Maru the next day, and Keiko Maru on 8 November. She ended her patrol at Pearl Harbor, where Lieutenant Commander Royce L. Gross relieved Commander Warder. She then proceeded to the West Coast of the United States.

Seawolf arrived at Mare Island Naval Shipyard on 10 December 1942 and underwent an overhaul that lasted until 24 February 1943. She returned to Pearl Harbor on 13 March, and on 3 April stood out for another patrol near the Bonin Islands. On 15 April, she torpedoed Kaihei Maru, sank an old destroyer now known as Patrol Boat Number 39 on 23 April; and sank two 75-ton sampans with her 3 in (76 mm) gun. She ended this patrol early, on 3 May, because she had expended all torpedoes on enemy shipping.

Seawolf returned to Hunters Point Naval Shipyard for refitting and departed that island on 17 May and headed for the East China Sea. She ran into several large convoys as she prowled from Formosa to Nagasaki. The submarine tracked a convoy of 11 ships and fired a spread of torpedoes at a large freighter on 6 June. One torpedo hit the target but proved to be a dud, and another passed under the freighter and hit an escort. Two weeks later, she fired a spread at four ships. One was hit in the stern and sank in approximately nine minutes. This was Shojin Maru loaded with troops. Seawolf returned to Midway Island on 8 July and, four days later, steamed into Pearl Harbor.

Her next patrol was from 14 August–15 September. This patrol, in the East China Sea, was also ended prematurely due to firing all torpedoes. She sank 12,996 tons of enemy shipping, excluding two 75-ton sampans sunk by shellfire. Seawolf made contact with a six-ship convoy on her third day in the patrol area. She attacked day and night for three days before finally surfacing to sink Fusei Maru with her deck gun.

==== Eleventh through fourteenth war patrols ====
On Seawolf's 11th patrol, in the South China Sea from 5 October–27 November, she sank Wuhu Maru, Kaifuku Maru, and damaged a 10,000-ton cargo ship. The submarine refitted at Pearl Harbor, and on 22 December 1943, headed for the East China Sea on what was to be her most lucrative patrol. She attacked a seven-ship convoy on the night of 10–11 January 1944 and sank three ships totaling 19,710 tons.

On 14 January, Seawolf fired her last four torpedoes at two merchant ships in a convoy, damaging one and sinking Yamatsuru Maru. She continued tracking the convoy while radioing its position to Whale. Whale arrived on 16 January and promptly attacked, damaging one ship and sinking Denmark Maru. The next morning, Whale damaged another before action was broken off.

Seawolf returned to Pearl Harbor on 27 January and sailed for San Francisco two days later. After undergoing a major overhaul at Hunters Point, the submarine headed west on 16 May, with Lieutenant Commander Richard Barr Lynch in command. When she reached Pearl Harbor, she was assigned the task of photographing Peleliu Island in the Palau Islands, in preparation for the forthcoming attack on that stronghold. She carried out this mission despite constant enemy air patrols from 4 June–7 July.

The submarine headed to Majuro for voyage repairs and was rerouted to Darwin. There, she received orders sending her on a special mission to Tawitawi, in the Sulu Archipelago. The submarine approached to within 700 yards (640 m) of the beach, offloaded supplies and men, picked up a Captain Frank Young, an Allied Intelligence Bureau coast watcher, and took him to Brisbane. The operation order also called for Seawolf to land a party and their supplies on northern Palawan Island.

==== Fifteenth war patrol and loss ====
Seawolf stood out of Brisbane on 21 September to begin her 15th war patrol under the command of Lieutenant Commander Albert Marion Bontier. She reached Manus Island on 29 September, refueled, and sailed the same day carrying stores and Army personnel to the east coast of Samar.

Seawolf and Narwhal exchanged radar recognition signals at 0756 on 3 October in the Morotai area. Shortly thereafter, a 7th Fleet task group was attacked by Ro-41. The destroyer escort Shelton was torpedoed and sunk, and Richard M. Rowell began to search for the enemy.

Since there were four friendly submarines in the vicinity of this attack, they were directed to give their positions and the other three did, but Seawolf was not heard from. On 4 October, Seawolf again was directed to report her position, and again she failed to do so. One of two planes from the escort carrier Midway sighted a submarine submerging and dropped two bombs on it even though it was in a safety zone for American submarines. The site was marked by dye. Rowell's commanding officer knew he was in a safety lane, but, having failed to get word Seawolf was behind schedule, believed there was no U.S. submarine nearby and chose to attack. Rowell established sonar contact on the submarine, which then sent a series of dashes and dots which Rowell stated bore no resemblance to the existing recognition signals. Believing this an attempt to jam her sonar, Rowell attacked with Hedgehog. The second attack was followed by underwater explosions, and debris rose to the surface.

On 28 December 1944, Seawolf was declared overdue from patrol and presumed lost. She was stricken from the Naval Vessel Register on 20 January 1945.

Post-war examination of Japanese records shows no attack listed that could account for the loss of Seawolf. While it is possible Seawolf was lost to an operational casualty or as a result of an unrecorded enemy attack, it is more likely she was sunk by friendly fire. 83 officers and men as well as 17 Army passengers were lost. She was the thirty-fourth U.S. submarine lost in the Pacific War, the second to friendly fire. One of the Army passengers was Captain Howell S. Kopp, an Alamo Scout. Kopp was en route to an undisclosed location in the Philippines to conduct a clandestine mission in support of the upcoming Allied landing on Leyte.

== Honors and awards ==
- Asiatic-Pacific Campaign Medal with 13 battle stars for World War II service

Seawolf ranked fourteenth in confirmed tonnage sunk (71,609 tons), the most for a Sargo-class submarine. She tied for seventh with the submarines USS Rasher (SS-269) and USS Trigger (SS-237) in confirmed ships sunk, according to the postwar accounting of the Joint Army–Navy Assessment Committee (JANAC).

== Commemoration ==
The contributions and sacrifices of Seawolf and her crew are officially commemorated in Seawolf Park, located on Pelican Island, just north of Galveston, Texas.

== In popular culture ==
Seawolf is one of several submarines (along with the era's USS Tang, Bowfin, Growler, and Spadefish) whose war patrols can be re-enacted in the 1985 MicroProse computer game Silent Service and the game's various ports, including Konami's 1989 release for the Nintendo Entertainment System.

== See also ==
- List of most successful American submarines in World War II
