= Sargo-class submarine =

US Navy submarine class of World War II

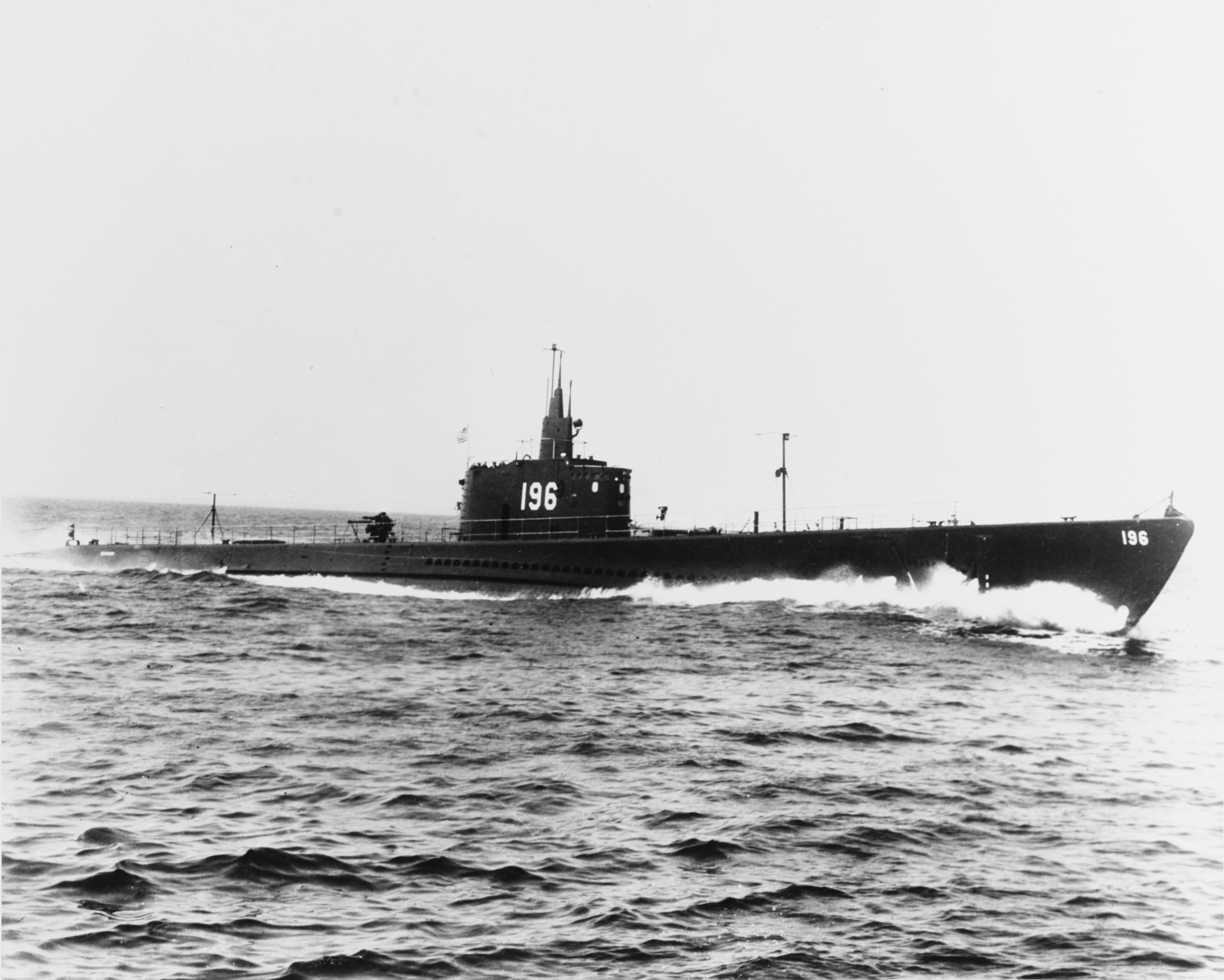
- USS Searaven during her sea trials on 13 May 1940

Class overview
- Name: Sargo class
- Builders: Electric Boat Company, Portsmouth Naval Shipyard, Mare Island Naval Shipyard
- Operators: United States Navy
- Preceded by: Salmon class
- Succeeded by: Tambor class
- Built: 1937–1939
- In commission: 1939–1946
- Completed: 10
- Lost: 4
- Retired: 6

General characteristics
- Type: Composite direct-drive and diesel-electric (first 6) or full diesel-electric (last 4) submarine
- Displacement: 1,450 tons (1473 t) standard, surfaced; 2,350 tons (2,388 t) submerged
- Length: 310 ft 6 in (94.64 m)
- Beam: 26 ft 10 in (8.18 m)
- Draft: 16 ft 7½ in – 16 ft 8 in (5.08 m)
- Propulsion: 4 × Hooven-Owens-Rentschler (H.O.R.) or General Motors diesel engines (two direct-drive, two driving electrical generators in early boats, all driving electrical generators in late boats), 1,535 hp (1,145 kW) each; 2 × 126-cell Sargo batteries; 4 × high-speed geared electric motors, 685 hp (511 kW) each; 2 × auxiliary diesel generators, 258 kW (346 hp) each; two shafts; Net 5,200–5,500 shp (3,900–4,100 kW) surfaced; 2,740 hp (2,040 kW) submerged
- Speed: 21 knots (39 km/h) surfaced; 8.75 knots (16 km/h) submerged
- Range: 11,000 nautical miles (20,000 km) at 10 knots (19 km/h)
- Endurance: 48 hours at 2 knots (3.7 km/h) submerged
- Test depth: 250 ft (76 m) Crush Depth Possible 450 ft (140 m)
- Complement: 5 officers, 54 enlisted
- Armament: 8 × 21 inch (533 mm) torpedo tubes (four forward, four aft); 24 torpedoes; 1 × 3-inch (76 mm)/50 caliber deck gun; four machine guns

The Sargo-class submarines were among the first United States submarines to be sent into action after the Japanese attack on Pearl Harbor, starting war patrols the day after the attack, having been deployed to the Philippines in late 1941. Similar to the previous Salmon class, they were built between 1937 and 1939. With a top speed of 21 knots, a range of 11,000 nautical miles (20,000 km) (allowing patrols in Japanese home waters), and a reliable propulsion plant, along with the Salmons they were an important step in the development of a true fleet submarine. In some references, the Salmons and Sargos are called the "New S Class", 1st and 2nd Groups.

The Sargo-class submarine USS Swordfish (SS-193) had the distinction of being the first US Navy submarine to sink a Japanese ship in World War II.

== Design ==
In most features the Sargos were a repeat of the Salmons, except for the return to full diesel-electric drive for the last four boats and the adoption of the improved Sargo battery design. The first six Sargos were driven by a composite direct-drive and diesel-electric plant (two engines in each mode) in the same manner as the Salmons. In this arrangement, two main engines in the forward engine room drove generators. In the after engine room, two side-by-side engines were clutched to reduction gears which sat forward of the engines, with vibration-isolating hydraulic clutches. Two high-speed electric motors, driven by the generating engines or batteries, were also connected to each reduction gear. The Bureau of Steam Engineering (BuEng) and the General Board desired a full diesel-electric plant, but there were some dissenting opinions, notably Admiral Thomas C. Hart, the only experienced submariner on the General Board, who pointed out that a full diesel-electric system could be disabled by flooding. Technical problems went against the use of two large direct-drive diesels in place of the four-engine composite plant. No engine of suitable power to reach the desired 21-knot speed existed in the US, and the current vibration-isolating hydraulic clutches were not capable of transmitting enough power. It was also not practical to gear two engines to each shaft. So a full diesel-electric plant was adopted for the last four Sargos, and remained standard for all subsequent conventionally-powered US submarines.

Four of the class (Sargo, Saury, Spearfish, and Seadragon) were equipped with the troublesome Hooven-Owens-Rentschler (HOR) double-acting diesels. An attempt to produce more power from a smaller engine than other contemporary designs, the double-acting system proved unreliable in service. During World War II, all had their engines replaced with GM Cleveland Diesel 16-278A engines, probably during their overhauls in early 1943.

BuEng had designed a new lead-acid battery to resist battle damage, known as the Sargo battery because it was first installed on Sargo and was based on a suggestion by her commissioning commanding officer, Lieutenant E. E. Yeomans. Instead of a single hard rubber case, it had two concentric hard rubber cases with a layer of soft rubber between them. This was to prevent sulfuric acid leakage in the event one case cracked during depth-charging. This remained the standard battery design until replaced with Sargo II and GUPPY batteries in submarines upgraded under the Greater Underwater Propulsion Power Program after World War II. Each battery's capacity was slightly increased by installing 126 cells instead of 120; this also raised the nominal voltage from 250 volts to 270 volts, which has been standard in US usage ever since, including the backup batteries of nuclear submarines.

The original Mark 21 3-inch (76 mm)/50 caliber deck gun proved to be too light in service. It lacked sufficient punch to finish off crippled or small targets quickly enough to suit the crews. It was replaced by the Mark 9 4-inch (102 mm)/50 caliber gun in 1943-44, in most cases removed from an S-boat being transferred to training duty.

== Boats in class ==
Name	Hull no.	Builder	Laid down	Launched	Commissioned	Fate
Sargo	SS-188	Electric Boat, Groton, Connecticut	12 May 1937	6 June 1938	7 February 1939	Sold for scrap 19 May 1947 to Learner Company of Oakland, California
Saury	SS-189	Electric Boat, Groton, Connecticut	28 June 1937	20 August 1938	3 April 1939	Sold for scrap 19 May 1947 to Learner Company of Oakland, California
Spearfish	SS-190	Electric Boat, Groton, Connecticut	9 September 1937	29 October 1938	12 July 1939	Sold for scrap 19 May 1947 to Learner Company of Oakland, California
Sculpin	SS-191	Portsmouth Navy Yard, Kittery, Maine	7 September 1937	27 July 1938	16 January 1939	Damaged by depth charges and gunfire from the Yamagumo 19 November 1943; scuttled
Squalus	SS-192	Portsmouth Navy Yard, Kittery, Maine	18 October 1937	14 September 1938	1 March 1939	Sank on trials 23 May 1939; raised and recommissioned as Sailfish 15 May 1940; sold for scrap 18 June 1948 to Luria Brothers and Company of Philadelphia, Pennsylvania
Swordfish	SS-193	Mare Island Navy Yard, Vallejo, California	27 October 1937	4 January 1939	22 July 1939	Lost on or about 12 January 1945 presumed sunk by mine or by depth charge by Japanese anti-submarine vessel
Seadragon	SS-194	Electric Boat, Groton, Connecticut	18 April 1938	21 April 1939	23 October 1939	Sold for scrap 2 July 1948 to Luria Brothers and Company of Philadelphia
Sealion	SS-195	Electric Boat, Groton, Connecticut	20 June 1938	25 May 1939	27 November 1939	Bombed by Japanese aircraft at Cavite Navy Yard 10 December 1941; scuttled 25 December 1941
Searaven	SS-196	Portsmouth Navy Yard, Kittery, Maine	9 August 1938	21 June 1939	2 October 1939	Target in Operation Crossroads atomic bomb test at Bikini Atoll 1946, later expended as target 11 September 1948
Seawolf	SS-197	Portsmouth Navy Yard, Kittery, Maine	27 September 1938	15 August 1939	1 December 1939	Sunk by "friendly fire" from the destroyer escort USS Richard M. Rowell 3 October 1944

== Service ==
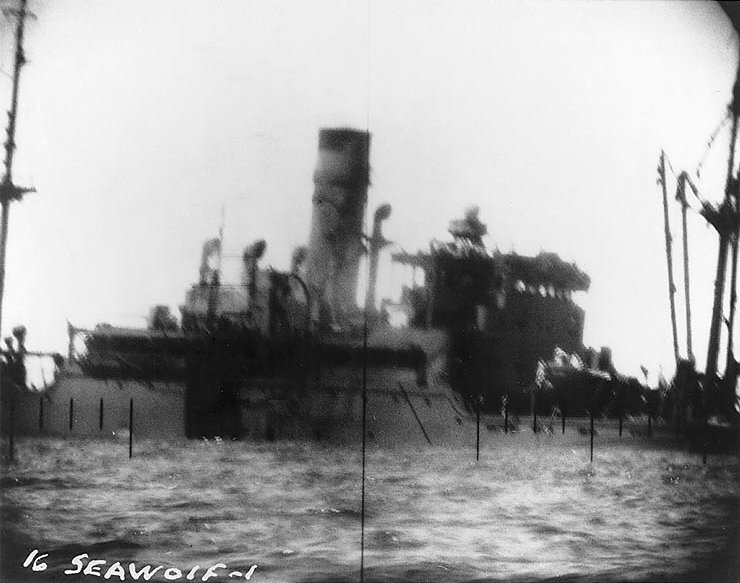
Periscope photo of a Japanese merchant ship sinking after being torpedoed by Seawolf.

From commissioning until late 1941 the first six Sargos were based first at San Diego, later at Pearl Harbor. The last four were sent to the Philippines shortly after commissioning. In October 1941, the remaining Sargos and most other newer available submarines were transferred to the Asiatic Fleet in the Philippines as part of a belated effort to reinforce U.S. and Allied forces in Southeast Asia. The Japanese occupation of southern Indo-China and the August 1941 American-British-Dutch retaliatory oil embargo had raised international tensions.

After the Japanese attack on Pearl Harbor on 7 December 1941, the submarines of the Asiatic Fleet were the primary striking force available to Admiral Thomas C. Hart, the fleet's commander. He was assigned sixteen Salmons or Sargos; the entirety of both classes. Seven Porpoise-class and six S-boats rounded out the force. The Japanese did not bomb the Philippines until 10 December 1941, so almost all of the submarines were able to get underway before an attack. Sealion and Seadragon were the unlucky exceptions. In overhaul at the Cavite Navy Yard, Sealion was damaged beyond repair and was scuttled on 25 December. Seadragon, assisted by USS Canopus and USS Pigeon, was able to leave port with emergency repairs and went on to fight for most of the war.

The Sargo class was very active during the war, sinking 73 ships, including a Japanese submarine. Four were lost, including one to "friendly fire".

Sailfish of this class sank the Japanese aircraft carrier Chūyō, which was carrying 21 survivors from the submarine Sculpin; only one of these prisoners survived the sinking. Sculpin had been one of the ships assisting in the rescue of 33 men when Squalus sank during a test dive in 1939; Squalus was refloated and recommissioned as USS Sailfish.

In early 1945 the surviving boats of this class were transferred to training roles for the remainder of the war, eventually being scrapped in 1947-48. Searaven was used in the Bikini Atoll atomic weapon tests in 1946. There was negligible damage so she was later expended as a target in 1948. Sailfish was also due to become a target in the same atomic weapon tests but she was scrapped instead in 1948.

== See also ==
- List of most successful American submarines in World War II
- Allied submarines in the Pacific War
- List of lost United States submarines
- Unrestricted submarine warfare
- Torpedo
- List of submarine classes of the United States Navy
- List of submarines of the Second World War
