= Operation Starvation =

World War II operation

- Part of the Pacific War
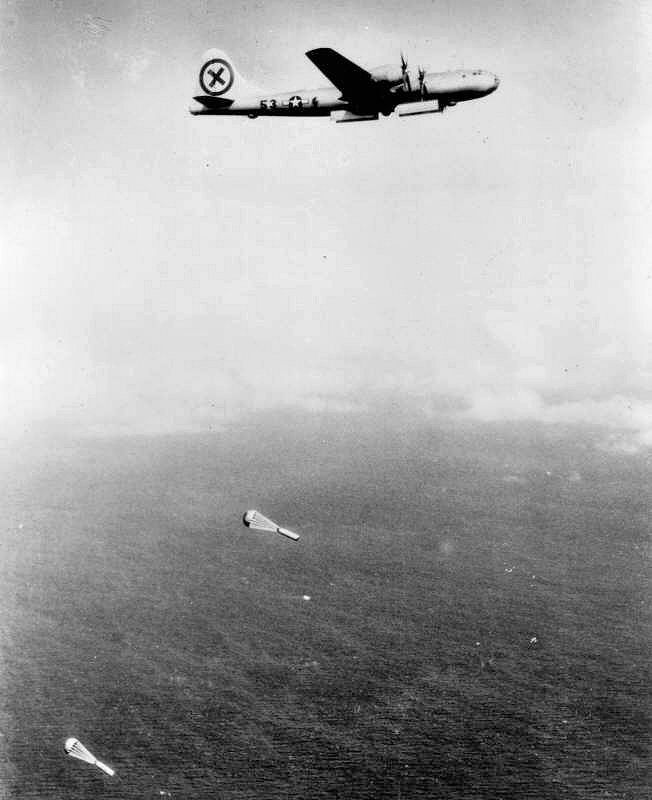
- B-29 dropping sea mines on a training mission in the Marianas
Date	April 1945
Location	Japanese territorial waters

Belligerents
United States	Empire of Japan

Commanders and leaders
Chester Nimitz	Koshirō Oikawa

Casualties and losses
15 aircraft lost	670 ships sunk or damaged, totaling 1,250,000+ tons

Operation Starvation was a naval mining operation conducted in World War II by the United States Army Air Forces (USAAF) to disrupt Japanese shipping.

== Operation ==
The mission was initiated at the insistence of Admiral Chester Nimitz who wanted his naval operations augmented by an extensive mining of Japan conducted by the USAAF. While General Henry H. Arnold felt this was strictly a naval priority, he assigned General Curtis LeMay to carry it out.

LeMay assigned one group of about 160 aircraft of the 313th Bombardment Wing to the task, with orders to plant 2,000 mines in April 1945. The mining runs were made by individual B-29 Superfortresses at night at moderately low altitudes. Radar provided mine release information. The 313th Bombardment Wing received preliminary training in aerial mining theory while their B-29 aircraft received bomb-bay modification to carry mines. Individual aircrew were then given four to eight training flights involving five radar approaches on each flight and dummy mine drops on the last flight.

Beginning on 27 March 1,000 parachute-retarded influence mines with magnetic and acoustic detonators were initially dropped, followed by many more, including models with water pressure displacement detonators. This mining proved the most efficient means of destroying Japanese shipping during World War II. In terms of damage per unit of cost, it surpassed strategic bombing and the United States submarine campaign.

Eventually most of the major ports and straits of Japan were repeatedly mined, severely disrupting Japanese logistics and troop movements for the remainder of the war with 35 of 47 essential convoy routes having to be abandoned. For instance, shipping through Kobe declined by 85%, from 320,000 tons in March to only 44,000 tons in July. Operation Starvation sank more ship tonnage in the last six months of the war than the efforts of all other sources combined. The Twentieth Air Force flew 1,533 sorties, with 1,384 mining the primary fields (90.3%) and 42 mining secondary fields (2.75%). They laid 12,135 mines (nearly 9,100 tons) in 26 fields on 46 separate missions. Mining demanded only 5.9% of the XXI Bomber Command's total successful sorties, and only 16 B-29s were lost in the effort (including three scrapped because of battle damage). In return, mines sank or damaged 670 ships totaling more than 1,250,000 tons. Bomber crews counted 54 attacks by Japanese fighters during the campaign and claimed one shot down.

== Aftermath ==
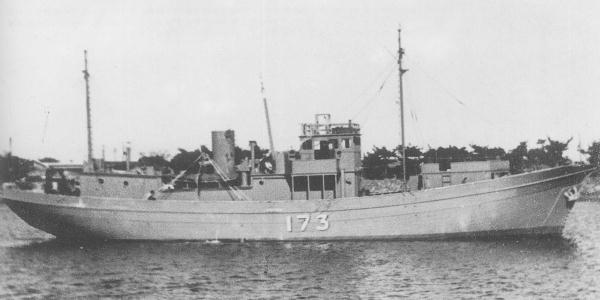
No.1-class auxiliary patrol boats played an active part in the post-war minesweeping effort

After the war, the commander of Japan's mine sweeping operations noted that he thought this mining campaign could have directly led to the defeat of Japan on its own had it begun earlier. Similar conclusions were reached by American analysts who reported in July 1946 in the Strategic Bombing Survey that it would have been more efficient to combine the United States' effective anti-shipping submarine effort with land- and carrier-based air power to strike harder against merchant shipping and begin a more extensive aerial mining campaign earlier in the war. This would have starved Japan, forcing an earlier end to the war.

== See also ==
- Air raids on Japan
- Blockade of Germany (World War II)
