= Allied submarines in the Pacific War =

Submarine warfare conducted by Allied forces in the Pacific during World War II

- Part of the Pacific Theater of World War II
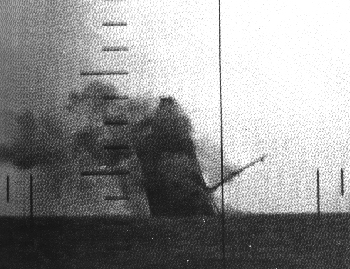
- Japanese freighter Nittsu Maru sinks after being torpedoed by USS Wahoo on 21 March 1943.
Date	1941 – 1945
Location	Pacific Ocean, Indian Ocean
Result	Allied victory

Belligerents
Allies United States Navy Royal Navy Royal Netherlands Navy Soviet Navy	Axis Imperial Japanese Navy Kriegsmarine

Allied submarines were used extensively during the Pacific War and were a key contributor to the defeat of the Empire of Japan. A total of 283 allied submarines were active in the Pacific and Southeast Asia between 1941 and 1945, of which 61 were sunk.

During the war, submarines of the United States Navy were responsible for 56% of Japan's merchant marine losses; other Allied navies added to the toll. The war against shipping was the single most decisive factor in the collapse of the Japanese economy. Allied submarines also sank a large number of Imperial Japanese Army (IJA) troop transports, killing many thousands of Japanese soldiers and hampering the deployment of IJA reinforcements during the battles on the Pacific islands.

They also conducted reconnaissance patrols, landed special forces and guerrilla troops and performed search and rescue tasks. The majority of the submarines involved were from the U.S. Navy, with the British Royal Navy committing the second largest number of boats and the Royal Netherlands Navy contributing smaller numbers of boats.

The Allied submarine campaign is one of the least-publicized feats in military history, in large part because of the efforts of Allied governments to ensure their own submarines' actions were not reported in the media. The U.S. Navy adopted an official policy of unrestricted submarine warfare, and it appears the policy was executed without the knowledge or prior consent of the government. The London Naval Treaty, to which the U.S. was signatory, required submarines to abide by prize rules (commonly known as "cruiser rules"). It did not prohibit arming merchantmen, but arming them, or having them report contact with submarines (or raiders), made them de facto naval auxiliaries and removed the protection of the cruiser rules. This made restrictions on submarines effectively moot.

== Background ==
The U.S. had the largest and most powerful submarine force of all the Allied countries in the Pacific at the outbreak of war. Pre-war U.S. Navy doctrine—like that of all major navies—specified that the main role of submarines was to support the surface fleet by conducting reconnaissance and attacking large enemy warships. Merchant ships were regarded as secondary targets, and the circumstances in which they could be attacked were greatly limited by prize rules set out in the London Naval Treaty, to which the U.S. was a signatory.

The U.S. Navy built large submarines which boasted long range, a relatively fast cruising speed and a heavy armament of torpedoes. United States submarines were better suited for long patrols in the tropics than those of the other major powers due to amenities such as air conditioning (which German U-boats, for instance, lacked) and fresh water distillation units. The submarines' commanders and crewmen were considered elite and enjoyed a strong esprit de corps. On 7 December 1941, the USN had 55 fleet- and 18 medium-sized submarines (S-boats) in the Pacific, 38 submarines elsewhere, and 73 under construction. (By war's end, the U.S. had completed 228 submarines.)

While Britain stationed a force of submarines in the Far East prior to the outbreak of war, no boats were available in December 1941. The British had 15 modern submarines in the Far East in September 1939. These submarines formed part of the China Station and were organised into the 4th Flotilla. Although the number of British submarines in the Far East increased in early 1940 when the 8th Flotilla arrived at Ceylon, both flotillas and all their submarines were withdrawn in mid-1940 to reinforce the Mediterranean Fleet.

The Netherlands also maintained a submarine force in the Far East in order to protect the Netherlands East Indies (NEI). In December 1941, this force comprised 15 boats based at Surabaya, most of which were obsolete.

== Strategic implications ==
Throughout the war, Japan was dependent on sea transport to provide adequate resources, including food, to the home islands and supply its military at garrisons across the Pacific. Before the war, Japan estimated the nation required 5,900,000 long tons (6,000,000 t) of shipping to maintain the domestic economy and military during a major war. At the time of the attack on Pearl Harbor Japan's shipping capacity was much greater than that, totaling 7,600,000 long tons (7,700,000 t) of shipping: the Japanese merchant fleet was capable of 6,400,000 long tons (6,500,000 t), and smaller craft were capable of an additional 1,200,000 long tons (1,200,000 t).

Despite an awareness that shipping was vital, the Japanese navy seriously underestimated the (eventual) threat from Allied submarines. Anti-submarine warfare was accorded a low priority and few warships were allocated to protecting merchant shipping, while aircraft were rarely used. Japanese destroyers formed the bulk of convoy protection; they had impressive night fighting capabilities with powerful surface armament of guns and torpedoes, but had deficiencies in sonar and radar compared to equivalents of other navies. Moreover, Japanese Navy doctrine in relation to commerce defense was very bad. This overconfidence was reinforced by the ineffectiveness of Allied submarines in the early part of the war, in particular due to the U.S. submarines being led largely by timid skippers and being equipped with faulty Mark 14 torpedoes. While the Allies in the Atlantic had to ramp up their shipbuilding capability quickly to replace the large number of ships sunk by German U-boats in the Atlantic theatre, the initial low losses of Japanese ships in the Pacific meant that Japanese shipbuilding faced no immediate urgency to increase production.

The size and effectiveness of the Allied submarine force increased greatly during the Pacific War. The U.S. increased production of modern submarines from 1942 onward. The efforts of Admiral Charles A. Lockwood were crucial for the rectification of the Mark 14's problems which were finally resolved in September 1943. Lockwood also selected more aggressive submarine skippers. Signals intelligence broke the "maru code" in January 1943, after a gaffe by U.S. Customs pre-war had caused Japan to change it, and American aircraft engaged in aerial minelaying in Operation Starvation. As a result of all of these developments, U.S. submarines suddenly inflicted devastating losses on Japanese merchant shipping in 1943 and 1944, which caught Japanese military planners off-guard as they lacked the industrial capacity to replace ships that were sunk, and by January 1945 the Japanese merchant fleet was effectively destroyed.

== Countering the Japanese offensive (1941-42) ==
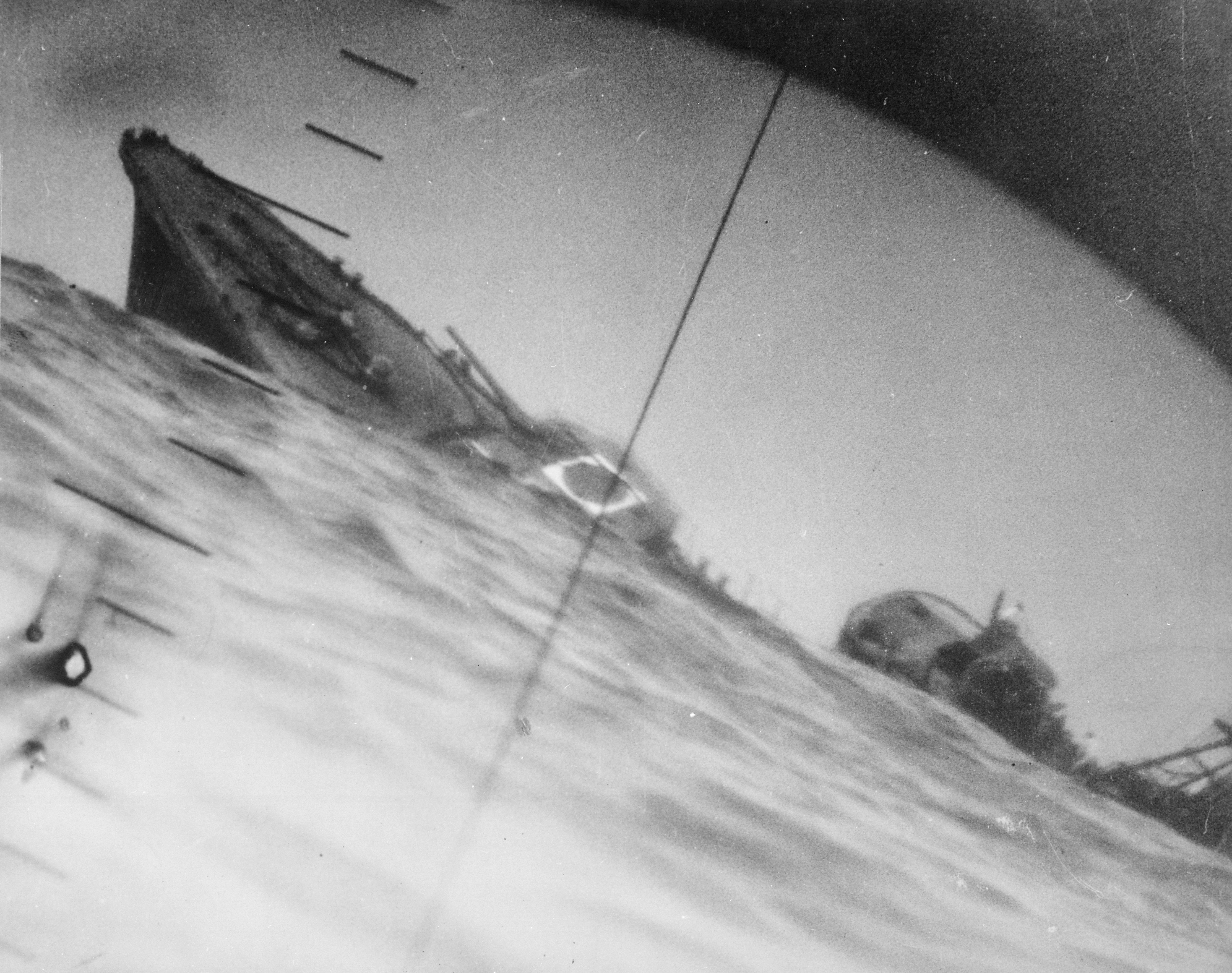
Torpedoed Japanese destroyer Yamakaze photographed through the periscope of American submarine USS Nautilus on 25 June 1942.

In a break with pre-war doctrine (which, like Japan's, had presumed a rush across the Pacific and a "decisive battle" between battleships), with the London Naval Treaty, and with long-standing U.S. defense of freedom of the seas, U.S. naval commanders in the Pacific were ordered by the U.S. Navy Chief of Staff to "execute unrestricted air and submarine warfare against Japan" on the afternoon of 7 December 1941, six hours after the Japanese attack. This order authorized all U.S. submarines in the Pacific to attack and sink any warship, commercial vessel, or civilian passenger ship flying the Japanese flag, without warning. Thomas C. Hart, commander in chief, U.S. Asiatic Fleet, issued the same order at 03:45 Manila time (09:15 in Hawaii, 14:45 in DC) on his own initiative (but knowing U.S. Navy Chief of Operations Harold "Betty" Stark intended to do so).

The Pacific Fleet submarine force had emerged unscathed from the attack on Pearl Harbor and USS Gudgeon departed on the fleet's first offensive war patrol on 11 December. The Asiatic Fleet's 27 submarines (including more fleet boats than at Pearl Harbor) also went into action on the first day of U.S. involvement in the war, beginning war patrols in the waters around the Philippines and Indochina. Due to inadequate prewar planning, which made no provision for defensive minelaying, nor for placing submarines on station around the Philippines, nor off enemy harbors, the Asiatic Fleet's efforts to counter the Japanese invasion of the Philippines were unsuccessful and the fleet's surviving submarines were forced to withdraw to Surabaya in the Dutch East Indies (DEI).

British, and U.S. submarines took part in the unsuccessful defense of British Malaya and the DEI in late 1941 and early 1942. In December 1941, five Dutch submarines attacked the Japanese invasion fleet off Malaya. These submarines sank two Japanese merchant ships and damaged four others, but three of the attackers were sunk. The two surviving Dutch submarines were withdrawn to defend the DEI, where they were assisted by two British submarines, which had been transferred from the Mediterranean Fleet, and several U.S. boats. The U.S. Asiatic Fleet's submarine force left Surabaya for Fremantle, Western Australia, on 1 March. (They would remain in Australia, on the most hazardous and unproductive stations for U.S. submarines, for the duration.) By this date, the Asiatic Fleet's 27 submarines had sunk 12 Japanese ships for the loss of four U.S. boats. Following the fall of the DEI, only a handful of British and Dutch submarines were based in the Indian Ocean, and these had little impact on Japanese forces in the area.

After the Battle of the Coral Sea, the U.S. Navy detached eight submarines to finish off the damaged aircraft carrier Shōkaku, but she evaded all of them. At the Battle of Midway, although the attack on the battleship Kirishima by USS Nautilus had been unsuccessful, it drew the destroyer Arashi temporarily away from the main fleet to drop depth charges, and the destroyer's return was traced by USS Enterprise's VB-6 to the Japanese task force, where the dive bombers promptly set on fire the fleet carriers Akagi and Kaga.

In 1942, the only significant warships that U.S. submarines had managed to sink were the heavy cruiser Kako and the light cruiser Tenryū.

=== Reasons for ineffectiveness ===
At the start of the war, the U.S. submarine fleet was ineffective, for multiple reasons:

- A high proportion of the submarines deployed against the Japanese were obsolete.
- U.S. boats were hampered by defects in their primary weapon, the Mark 14 torpedo.
- Poor training led to an excessive reliance on sonar.
- Skippers were insufficiently aggressive, and they exhibited an undue fear of destroyers' sonar and aircraft.
- Poor dispositions – the fleet were scattered on close surveillance of Japan's major bases.
- Command was divided, which kept submarines out of one of the best hunting areas, the Luzon Strait, for fear of friendly fire.

U.S. submarines struggled to sink Japanese warships or merchant ships, having only a 20% success rate from December 1941 to late 1943. For example, during the 1941-42 Philippines campaign the United States Navy's Asiatic Fleet's 23 modern state-of-the-art submarines failed to sink a single Japanese warship even when scoring direct hits, because the torpedoes all failed to explode for myriad reasons. It turns out that the defective Mark 14 and Mark 15 torpedoes were mass produced without adequate testing during development, so four major engineering faults remained undetected. Poor torpedoes claimed at least two U.S. submarines out of 48 lost on patrol.

== Increasing sinkings of Japanese shipping (1943-45) ==
From 1943, Allied submarines waged an increasingly effective campaign against Japanese merchant shipping and the IJN. By the end of the war in August 1945, the Japanese merchant marine had less than a quarter of the tonnage it had in December 1941. Overall, U.S. Navy submarines sank around 1,300 Japanese merchant ships, as well as roughly 200 warships.

Despite the need to maintain sea lanes for its empire, the Japanese never successfully developed a cost-effective destroyer escort better suited for convoy duties, while it also did not have the industrial might to replace the losses of its heavily armed destroyers, nor of its ill-protected merchantmen. The initial lack of U.S. submarine successes certainly reinforced Japanese complacency in convoy defense, compared to the Battle of the Atlantic where the continued menace of German U-boats against Allied convoys forced the Allies into developing new tactics and equipment, and such Allied attitudes as well as the massive U.S. shipbuilding capability meant that the Allies successfully maintained their Atlantic shipping routes despite pessimistic assessments from consistent merchant ship sinkings. By contrast in the Pacific War, once U.S. submarine skippers became more aggressive in their tactics and the U.S. Navy rectified their faulty torpedoes, the Japanese shipbuilding industry was unable to ramp up production to cope with the sudden uptick of losses. The Allies also used code-breaking to their advantages in both naval theatres which the Axis could not counter; in the Atlantic this allowed convoys to be rerouted away from U-boat wolfpacks and later in the war the Allies would use this intelligence to aggressively target wolfpacks with Hunter-killer Groups, while in the Pacific this alerted the Americans to Japanese convoys (especially certain vessels like oil tankers and those carrying engineers or mechanics) so that U.S. submarines could be deployed to interdict them.

Besides sinking increasing numbers of Japanese merchant ships, U.S. submarines inflicted tremendous losses to the heavy units of the Imperial Japanese Navy in 1944. They sunk the Japanese fleet carriers Shōkaku and Taihō in the Battle of the Philippine Sea; the sinking of two of three operational fleet carriers that the Japanese had left as well as heavy losses in aircraft ended the Japanese carriers as a potent force. U.S. submarines then sank or disabled three Takao-class cruisers at the start of the Battle of Leyte Gulf, then afterwards claimed the battleship Kongō (the only Japanese battleship lost to a submarine) which had survived Leyte. That year, U.S. submarines also sunk the escort carriers Shin'yō, Taiyō and Un'yō, and the fleet carriers Unryu and Shinano, the latter the largest vessel ever sunk by a submarine; most of these Japanese carriers would be sunk before being fully operation with their own airwings except for Taiyō who was screening Convoy Hi-71.

In 1943, U.S. Congressman Andrew J. May revealed the fact that Japanese depth charges were not being set deep enough to destroy U.S. submarines. While it has never been definitively established that May's disclosure actually prompted the Japanese to augment their strategy, Japanese anti-submarine warfare grew in effectiveness, particularly after the debut of radar in the IJN.

=== British and Dutch submarine operations ===
The British submarine force in the Far East was greatly expanded from August 1943 onward. The British Eastern Fleet was responsible for submarine operations in the Bay of Bengal, Strait of Malacca as far as Singapore, and the western coast of Sumatra to the Equator. Few large Japanese cargo ships operated in this area, and the British submarines' main targets were small craft operating in inshore waters. The submarines were deployed to conduct reconnaissance, interdict Japanese supplies travelling to Burma, and attack U-boats operating from Penang. The Eastern Fleet's submarine force continued to expand during 1944, and by October 1944 had sunk a cruiser, three submarines, six small naval vessels, 40,000 long tons (41,000 t) of merchant ships, and nearly 100 small vessels.

The British submarine force expanded its areas of operation in the last months of the war. In late 1944, the 8th Flotilla—with 11 British and Dutch submarines—was transferred to Fremantle and operated in the Java Sea and surrounding areas under the command of the U.S 7th Fleet. The 4th Flotilla and the newly formed 2nd Flotilla remained at Ceylon.

By March 1945, British boats had gained control of the Strait of Malacca, preventing any supplies from reaching the Japanese forces in Burma by sea. By this time, there were few large Japanese ships in the region, and the submarines mainly operated against small ships which they attacked with their deck guns.

In April the 8th Flotilla moved to Subic Bay in the Philippines and the 4th Flotilla replaced it at Fremantle. At this time, there were 38 British and Dutch submarines in the theater, and an additional five boats on their way from Europe. The submarine HMS Trenchant torpedoed and sank the heavy cruiser Ashigara in the Bangka Strait, taking down some 1,200 Japanese army troops.

Three British submarines were sunk by the Japanese during the war: HMS Stratagem, HMS Porpoise, and HMS Stonehenge (which was mined).

=== Merchant shipping losses ===
Different sources provide varying figures for the size of the Japanese merchant marine and its wartime losses.

Size of the Japanese merchant fleet during World War II (all figures in tons)

Date	Additions	Losses	Net change	End of period total	Index
12/07/1941				6,384,000	100
12/1941	44,200	51,600	−7,400	6,376,600	99
1942	661,800	1,095,800	−434,000	5,942,600	93
1943	1,067,100	2,065,700	−998,600	4,494,400	77
1944	1,735,100	4,115,100	−2,380,000	2,564,000	40
1/45 – 8/45	465,000	1,562,100	−1,097,100	1,466,900	23

Japanese merchant fleet losses during World War II (all figures in tons, taken from JANAC)

Date	Starting tonnage	Additions	Losses	Net change	End of period total
1942 (including 12/41)	5,975,000	111,000	725,000	−89,000	5,886,000
1943	5,886,000	177,000	1,500,000	−1,323,000	4,963,000
1944	4,963,000	624,000	2,700,000	−2,076,000	2,887,000
1945	2,887,000	?	415,000	−415,000	2,472,000
end of war				-3,903,000	1,983,000

One Japanese reference reports 15,518 civilian ships lost. JANAC reports 2,117 Japanese merchant ships lost with a total tonnage of 7,913,858 long tons (8,040,851 t) and 611 IJN ships lost with a total tonnage of 1,822,210 long tons (1,851,450 t).

=== Attacks on IJA troopships and hell ships ===
In addition to taking a heavy toll on Japan's merchant shipping, a large number of troopships were also sunk. This resulted in the loss of thousands of Japanese troops, who were being transported to bolster Japan's already declining manpower on land in the final years of the war. Allied submarines sank an estimated 44 Japanese troopships with greater than 1,000 casualties in 33 of them. The threat of submarine attack seriously hampered the ability of the Japanese Army to move troops.

Allied submarines also sank a number of hell ships, which were transporting Allied POWs and rōmusha slave labourers. It is estimated that 10,800 POWs died at sea. Most of these deaths were the result of an Allied submarine attack. Donald L. Miller has estimated the loss of life among POWs was twice that, asserting "approximately 21,000 Allied POWs died at sea, about 19,000 of them killed by friendly fire."

=== American submarine losses ===
Some 16,000 American submariners served during the war, of whom 375 officers and 3,131 enlisted men were killed, resulting in a total fatality rate of around 22%. While this paled in comparison to the ~70% fatality rate suffered by German submariners, it was nevertheless made the submarine service among the most dangerous duties of all the American armed service.

Fifty-two submarines of the United States Navy were lost during World War II, all but one, Dorado (SS-248), were lost in the Pacific theater of operations. Two – Dorado (SS-248) and Seawolf (SS-197) – were lost to friendly fire (though there is speculation that the Dorado may have struck a German mine), at least three more – Tulibee, Tang, and Grunion – to defective torpedoes, and six to accident or grounding.

Another eight submarines went missing while on patrol and are presumed to have been sunk by Japanese mines, as there are no known Japanese anti-submarine attacks in their patrol areas. The other thirty-three lost submarines are known to have been sunk by the Japanese.

== Other duties ==
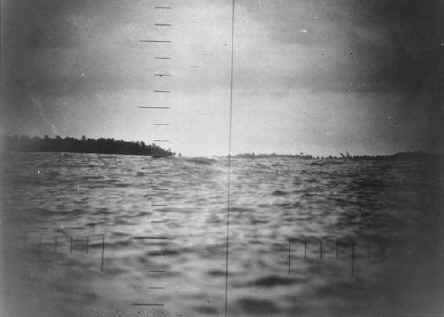
Photograph of Makin Island taken from USS Nautilus during the raid on the island in August 1942.

Allied submarines served in a range of other duties during the Pacific War. U.S. Navy submarines were often used for surveillance. This included taking photos of areas of interest (such as potential beaches for amphibious landings), and reporting on the movements of IJN warships. U.S. submarines landed and supplied reconnaissance and guerrilla forces and played a role in sustaining the guerrilla movement in the Philippines, at the cost of their diversion from attacks on Japanese commerce.

In late 1944 and 1945 several submarines were fitted with a newly developed FM (frequency modulated) sonar that was intended for detection of submerged mines, first Tinosa and Spadefish, and later Flying Fish, Skate, Bonefish, Crevalle, and Sea Dog. Tinosa surveyed and mapped the minefields around Okinawa prior to the US invasion, and the boats of Operation Barney used the sonar to map and penetrate the minefields of Tsushima Strait prior to operating inside the Sea of Japan.

They also occasionally transported commandos, such as Nautilus and Argonaut landing Marine Raiders for an abortive raid on Makin Atoll.

From early 1944 U.S. submarines were also used to rescue the crews of aircraft which had been forced down over the ocean. By the end of the war, submarines had rescued 504 airmen (including George H. W. Bush, who later became the 41st President of the United States).

British and Dutch submarines also landed and supplied special forces troops, rescued airmen, and shelled shore installations on nine occasions.

Britain also deployed a flotilla of midget submarines to the Far East which were used to conduct sabotage raids. The Fourteenth Flotilla, which was equipped with six XE-class submarines, arrived in Australia in April 1945 but was almost disbanded in May as no suitable targets could be found. The Flotilla's fortunes improved in early June, however, when undersea telegraph lines in the South China Sea were identified as being worthwhile targets along with a heavy cruiser at Singapore. On 31 July, XE4 cut the submerged Singapore-Saigon telegraph cable near Cape St. Jacques in French Indochina and XE5 cut the Hong Kong-Saigon cable close to Lamma Island, Hong Kong. At the same time, XE1 and XE3 penetrated the Straits of Johor where they severely damaged the Japanese heavy cruiser Takao with limpet mines.

== Submarine captain Medal of Honor awards ==
- Harder • Samuel D. Dealey^{(KIA)}
- Sculpin • John P. Cromwell^{(KIA)}
- Barb • Eugene B. Fluckey
- Parche • Lawson P. Ramage
- Tang • Richard O'Kane
- Growler • Howard W. Gilmore^{(KIA)}
- Tirante • George L. Street

== Post-war ==
Allied actions in the Pacific are believed to have been a mitigating factor in reducing the sentence of Großadmiral Karl Dönitz following the Nuremberg Trials, who was accused of similar actions in the Battle of the Atlantic; indeed, Admiral Nimitz provided Dönitz with a statement saying his boats behaved no differently. The official judgment of the International Military Tribunal cited the statement as part of the reason Dönitz's sentence was "not assessed on the ground of his breaches of the international law of submarine warfare".

== See also ==
- Hell ship
- Imperial Japanese Army shipping artillery – Gun crews for Japanese troop transports and defensively equipped merchant ships
- Japanese submarines in the Pacific War
- List of ships sunk by submarines by death toll
- List of most successful American submarines in World War II
- List of lost United States submarines
- Operation Starvation
- United States Submarine Operations in World War II by Theodore Roscoe
