= List of most successful American submarines in World War II =

Size of the Japanese merchant fleet during World War II (all figures in tons)
Date	Additions	Losses	Net change	End of period total	Index
12 July 1941				6,384,000	100
12/1941	44,200	51,600	−7,400	6,376,600	99
1942	661,800	1,095,800	−434,000	5,942,600	93
1943	1,067,100	2,065,700	−998,600	4,494,400	77
1944	1,735,100	4,115,100	−2,380,000	2,564,000	40
1/45 – 8/45	465,000	1,562,100	−1,097,100	1,466,900	23

In World War II, the United States Navy used submarines heavily. Overall, 263 US submarines undertook war patrols, claiming 1,392 ships and 5,583,400 tons during the war. (Note: In the Pacific Theater. Figures vary for the American and European Theaters) Submarines in the United States Navy were responsible for sinking 540,192 tons or 30% of the Japanese navy and 4,779,902 tons of shipping, or 54.6% of all Japanese shipping in the Pacific Theater. Submarines were responsible for laying 18,553 mines. At the beginning of the war, Japanese merchant ships had a carrying capacity of around six million tons. By the end of the war, in August 1945, the capacity was two million, with only 320,000 in condition to carry cargo.

Submarine warfare began on December 7, 1941, when the Chief of Naval Operations ordered the navy to "execute unrestricted air and submarine warfare against Japan." It appears the policy was executed without the knowledge or prior consent of the government. The London Naval Treaty, which the U.S. had signed, required submarines to abide by prize rules (commonly known as "cruiser rules"). It did not prohibit arming merchantmen, but arming them, or having them report contact with submarines (or raiders), made them de facto naval auxiliaries and removed the protection of the cruiser rules. This made restrictions on submarines effectively moot. U.S. Navy submarines also conducted reconnaissance patrols, landed special forces and guerrilla troops and performed search and rescue tasks. The submarines were so successful that by early 1944, they struggled to find targets. The war against shipping was the single most decisive factor in the collapse of the Japanese economy, and the Cabinet of Japan reported to the National Diet after the war that "the greatest cause of defeat was the loss of shipping."

Starting in 1941, submarines patrolled the American Theater, hunting German U-boats and protecting shipping lanes. Submarine Squadron 50, formed in 1942, served in the European Theater. The squadron was present in several invasions, and hunted blockade runners, first off of Spain and later Norway. The ships scored several hits, but a lack of targets led to them being returned to the United States.

== Total tonnage ==
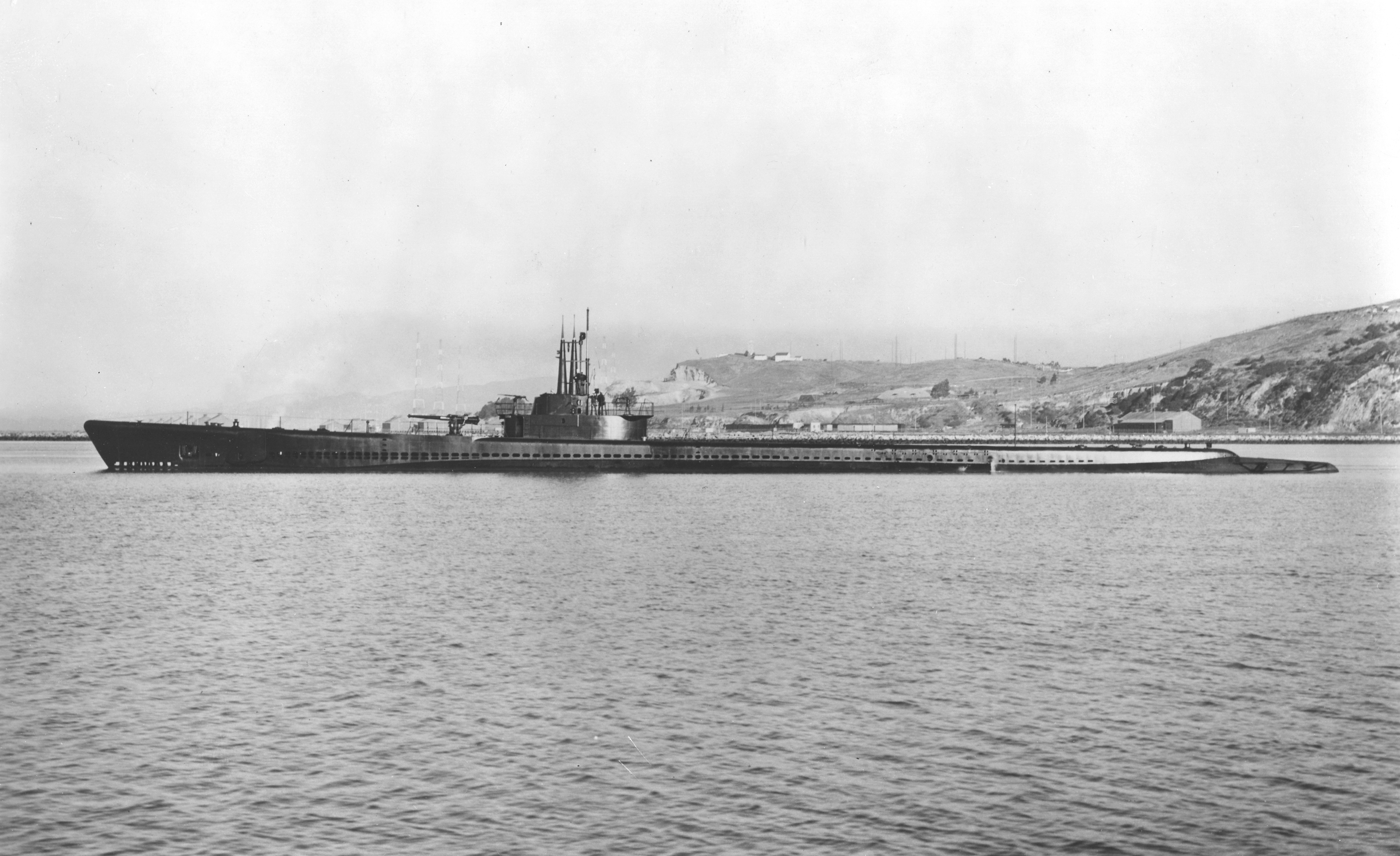
USS Tang

With 116,454 tons sunk, USS Tang sank the most tonnage of shipping in World War II for the United States. Its tonnage was revised from the Joint Army–Navy Assessment Committee (JANAC) report, which initially credited Tang with fewer sinkings. (93,824 tons and 24 ships) In 1980, the relevant JANAC section was officially replaced and updated. Tang sank more than 16,000 tons over the second highest submarine, USS Flasher (100,231). All 23 other submarines sank between 99,901 (USS Rasher) and 59,800 (USS Archerfish) tons. Fourteen of the submarines were Gato-class, six were Balao-class, four were Tambor-class and one was Sargo-class.

Top 25 scoring American submarines of World War II by tonnage sunk
Boat	Type	Total tonnage	Ref(s)
Tang	Balao-class	116,454 (Note: O'Kane 1989, p. 458. Her commanding officer, Lieutenant Commander Richard O'Kane, explains the Joint Army–Navy Assessment Committee (JANAC) report initially credited Tang with fewer sinkings. (93,824 tons and 24 ships) In 1980, the relevant JANAC section "was officially replaced by the credits in the patrol reports." These figures do not include Tang herself, who was accidentally sunk by her own torpedo in October 1944.)	
Flasher	Gato-class	100,231	
Rasher	Gato-class	99,901	
Barb	Gato-class	96,628	
Silversides	Gato-class	90,080	
Spadefish	Balao-class	88,091	
Trigger	Gato-class	86,552	
Drum	Gato-class	80,580	
Jack	Gato-class	76,687	
Snook	Gato-class	75,473	
Tautog	Tambor-class	72,606	
Seahorse	Balao-class	72,529	
Guardfish	Gato-class	72,424	
Seawolf	Sargo-class	71,609	
Gudgeon	Tambor-class	71,047	
Sealion	Balao-class	68,297	
Bowfin	Balao-class	67,882	
Thresher	Tambor-class	66,172	
Tinosa	Gato-class	64,655	
Grayback	Tambor-class	63,835	
Pogy	Gato-class	62,633	
Bonefish	Gato-class	61,345	
Wahoo	Gato-class	60,038	
Sunfish	Gato-class	59,815	
Archerfish	Balao-class	59,800	

== Ships sunk ==
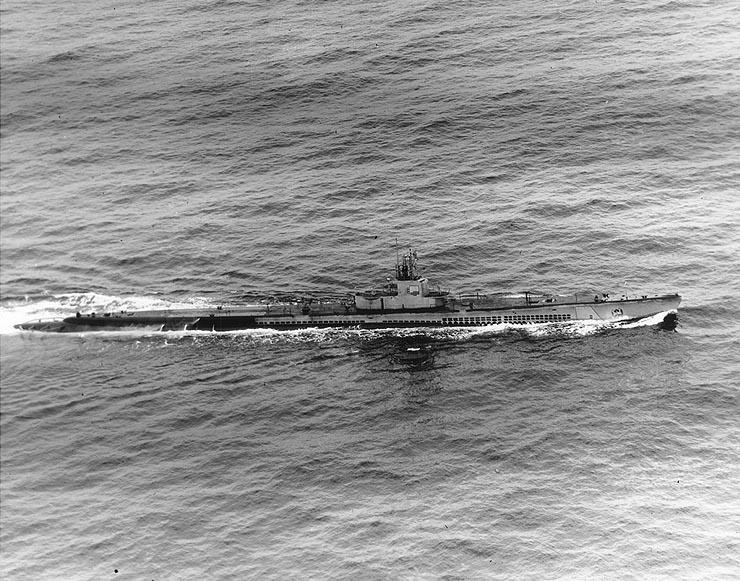
USS Tautog

With 33 ships sunk, USS Tang sank the most ships in World War II for the United States. Its number of ships sunk was revised from the Joint Army–Navy Assessment Committee (JANAC) report, which initially credited Tang with fewer sinkings (24 ships). In 1980, the relevant JANAC section was officially replaced and updated. Tautog sank the second most, with 26. The other submarines sank from 23 (Silversides) to 14 (Kingfish) ships. Seventeen ships were Gato-class, four were Balao-class and three were Tambor-class.

Top 25 scoring American submarines of World War II by ships sunk
Boat	Type	Ships sunk	Ref(s)
Tang	Balao-class	33	
Tautog	Tambor-class	26	
Silversides	Gato-class	23	
Flasher	Gato-class	21	
Spadefish	Balao-class	21	
Seahorse	Balao-class	20	
Wahoo	Gato-class	20	
Guardfish	Gato-class	19	
Rasher	Gato-class	19	
Seawolf	Sargo-class	18	
Trigger	Gato-class	18	
Snook	Gato-class	17	
Barb	Gato-class	17	
Thresher	Tambor-class	17	
Bowfin	Balao-class	16	
Harder	Gato-class	16	
Tinosa	Gato-class	16	
Pogy	Gato-class	16	
Sunfish	Gato-class	16	
Drum	Gato-class	15	
Flying Fish	Gato-class	15	
Greenling	Gato-class	15	
Jack	Gato-class	15	
Grayback	Tambor-class	14	
Kingfish	Gato-class	14	

== See also ==
- Allied submarines in the Pacific War
- List of lost United States submarines
- List of successful U-boats

== Bibliography ==
- Alden, John D.; McDonald, Craig R (2009). United States and Allied Submarine Successes in the Pacific and Far East during World War II. Jefferson NC: McFarland & Co. ISBN 9780786442133.
- Gruner, William P. (2012). "U.S. Pacific Submarines in World War II". San Francisco: Maritime Park Association.
- "Japanese Naval and Merchant Shipping Losses During World War II by All Causes". Joint Army–Navy Assessment Committee. 1947.
- Blair, Clay (1975). Silent Victory: The U.S. Submarine War against Japan. New York: Bantam. pp. 988–989. ISBN 9780553010503.
- O'Kane, Richard H. (1989) [1977]. Clear the Bridge!: The War Patrols of the U.S.S. Tang. Presidio Press. ISBN 978-0-89141-346-2.
