= USS Gudgeon (SS-211) =

Submarine of the United States Navy

Coordinates: 22°52′N 143°32′E

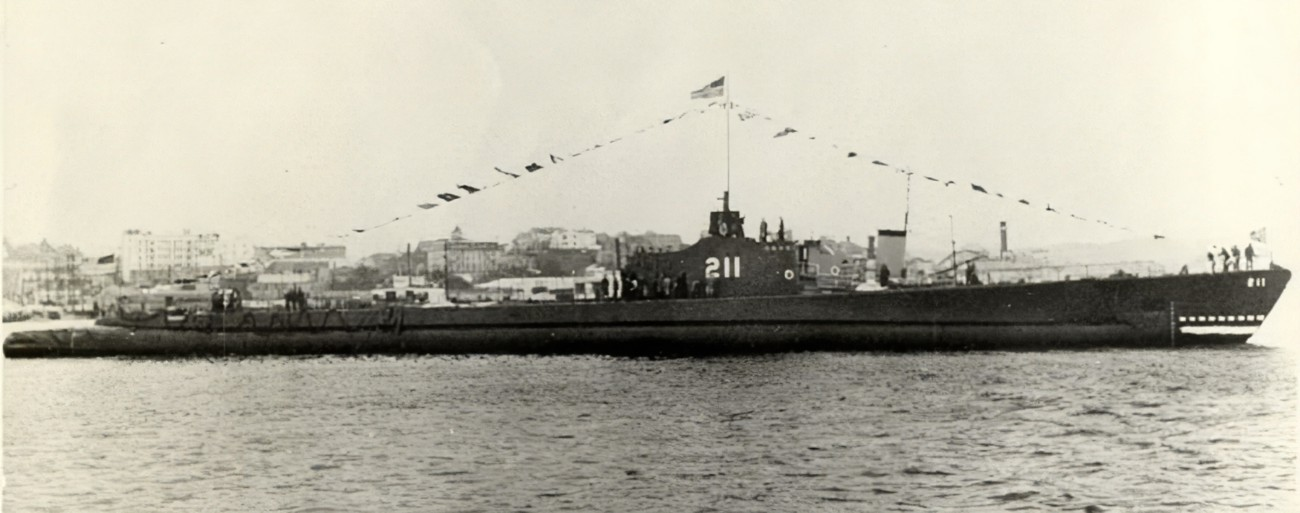
- Gudgeon anchored off Mare Island California

History

United States
- Name: Gudgeon
- Namesake: The Gudgeon
- Builder: Mare Island Naval Shipyard
- Laid down: 22 November 1939
- Launched: 25 January 1941
- Commissioned: 21 April 1941
- Fate: Lost off the Maug Islands, 18 April 1944

General characteristics
- Class & type: Tambor class diesel-electric submarine
- Displacement: 1,475 long tons (1,499 t) standard, surfaced; 2,370 long tons (2,410 t) submerged
- Length: 307 ft 2 in (93.62 m)
- Beam: 27 ft 3 in (8.31 m)
- Draft: 14 ft 7 1/2 in (4.458 m)
- Propulsion: 4 × Fairbanks-Morse Model 38D8-⅛ 9-cylinder opposed piston diesel engines driving electrical generators; 2 × 126-cell Sargo batteries; 4 × high-speed General Electric electric motors with reduction gears; two propellers; 5,400 shp (4.0 MW) surfaced; 2,740 shp (2.0 MW) submerged
- Speed: 20.4 knots (38 km/h) surfaced; 8.75 knots (16 km/h) submerged
- Range: 11,000 nautical miles (20,000 km) at 10 knots (19 km/h)
- Endurance: 48 hours at 2 knots (3.7 km/h) submerged
- Test depth: 250 ft (76 m)
- Complement: 6 officers, 54 enlisted
- Armament: 10 × 21-inch (533 mm) torpedo tubes; 6 forward, 4 aft; 24 torpedoes; 1 × 3-inch (76 mm) / 50 caliber deck gun; Bofors 40 mm and Oerlikon 20 mm cannon

USS Gudgeon (SS-211) was the first American submarine to sink an enemy warship in World War II (Pacific, 27 January 1942). She was the last of the long-range Tambor-class vessels commissioned for the United States Navy in the years before the country entered World War II. Gudgeon scored 14 confirmed kills, placing her 15th on the honor roll of American submarines. She was declared overdue, presumed lost with all hands, on 7 June 1944. Of the twelve Tambor-class submarines, only five survived the war.

== Pre-war ==
Her keel was laid down by the Mare Island Navy Yard. She was launched on 25 January 1941, sponsored by Mrs. Annie B. Pye, wife of Vice Admiral William S. Pye, Commander Battleships, Battle Force and Commander Battle Force. The boat was commissioned on 21 April 1941. Her construction cost $6 million.

After shakedown along the California coast, Gudgeon sailed north on 28 August, heading for Alaska via Seattle, Washington. On her northern jaunt the new submarine inspected Sitka, Kodiak, and Dutch Harbor for suitability as naval bases. Continuing to Hawaii, she moored at the Pearl Harbor submarine base on 10 October 1941. Training exercises and local operations filled Gudgeon’s time for the next two months. During the Japanese attack on Pearl Harbor on 7 December she was at Lahaina Roads on special exercises, but returned to base immediately.

== World War II ==
=== First war patrol ===
On 11 December, Gudgeon (commanded by Elton W. "Joe" Grenfell) departed Pearl Harbor on the first American submarine war patrol of World War II. Her commanding officer was provided with explicit written orders to carry out unrestricted submarine warfare. Gudgeon made her first contact on a target in Japanese Home Waters 31 December. When she returned 50 days later, Gudgeon had contributed two more impressive "firsts" to the Pacific submarine fleet. She was the first American submarine to patrol along the Japanese coast itself, as her area took her off Kyūshū in the home islands. On 27 January 1942, en route home, Gudgeon became the first United States Navy submarine to sink an enemy warship in World War II. Gudgeon fired three torpedoes, and the submarine I-73 was destroyed; though Gudgeon claimed only damage, the loss was confirmed by HYPO.

=== Second and third patrols ===
On her second war patrol, 22 February to 15 April 1942, Gudgeon scored two kills, first an unknown freighter on 26 March (not identified or confirmed by JANAC), then sinking the 6526-ton Nissho Maru on 27 March in the East China Sea southeast of Kumun Island.

She then checked into dry-dock for overhaul, but undocked three weeks early and readied for sea in a remarkable 40 hours to participate in the momentous Battle of Midway.

Departing Pearl Harbor on 18 May, Gudgeon took station off Midway Atoll as part of the submarine screen which encircled the two giant fleets clashing there. Gudgeon was prevented from offensive action by the confusion of battle, the possibility of mistaken identity, and poor staff work by Admiral Robert English, COMSUBPAC. She returned to Pearl Harbor on 14 June.

=== Fourth patrol ===
Departing for her fourth patrol 11 July, Gudgeon sank the 4853-ton transport Naniwa Maru in a night submerged attack off Truk on 3 August, her only kill of the patrol. In her other attack of the fourth patrol USS Gudgeon carried out an aggressive attack on a four-ship convoy 17 August, torpedoing and damaging the Japanese tankers Shinkoku Maru (10020 BRT) and Nichiei Maru (10020 BRT) northwest of Truk before the patrol ended at Fremantle, Australia, on 2 September.

=== Fifth and sixth patrols ===
Now a part of the Southwestern Pacific submarine forces, Gudgeon sank the 6783-ton Choko Maru west-northwest of Rabaul on 21 October during her fifth war patrol, 8 October to 1 December, and carried out a daring attack on a seven ship convoy on 11 November, torpedoing several ships but sinking none.

The submarine's sixth war patrol, from 27 December 1942 to 18 February 1943, was unsuccessful in terms of ships sunk, but she carried out two special missions. On 14 January 1943 Gudgeon successfully landed six men on Catmon Point, Negros Island, Western Visayas, Philippines, to carry out the vital guerrilla resistance movement there. Returning from her patrol area, Gudgeon was diverted to Timor Island on 9 February, and the following day rescued 28 men—Australian, English, Portuguese, and Filipino—for passage to Fremantle. One of the Australians was 22 year old Alfred James Ellwood, Z special force.

=== Seventh and eighth patrols ===
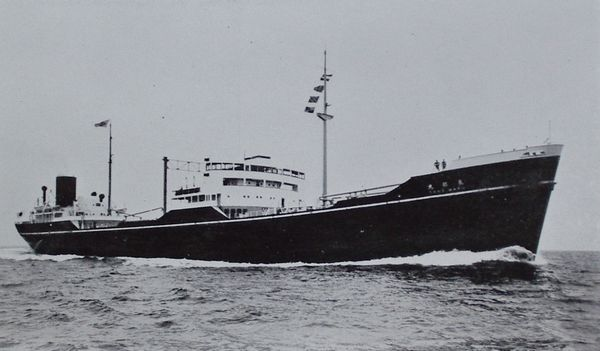
Toho Maru

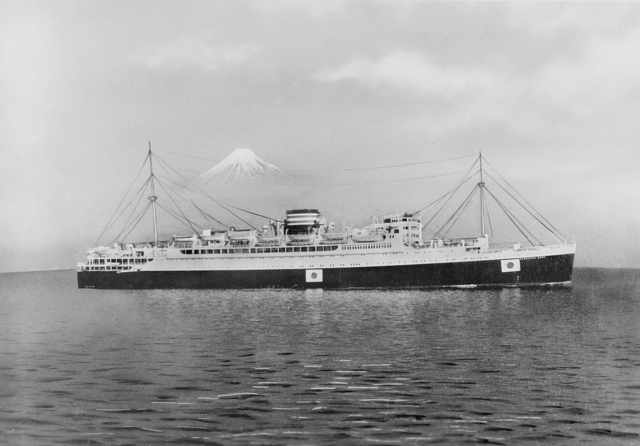
Kamakura Maru

Gudgeon's seventh war patrol, from 13 March into April 1943, netted her two more Japanese ships before she ran out of torpedoes and had to return to Australia. On 22 March she sank the 5434-ton transport Meigen Maru as well as seriously damaging two other ships in the Java Sea convoy some 30 miles north of Surabaya, Java, Netherlands East Indies. Five days later Gudgeon took on 9987-ton tanker Tōhō Maru in a night surface attack in the Makassar Strait punctuated by bursts of gunfire as the Japanese ships spotted and fired on the submarine. It took five torpedoes to sink Tōhō Maru, and most of Gudgeon's crew enjoyed the rare treat of watching her slide into the depths. Another attack later the same day damaged the 1192-ton tanker Kyoei Maru.

On her eighth war patrol, conducted as she sailed from Australia to Pearl Harbor on 15 April to 25 May 1943, Gudgeon chalked up three more kills. Her first came 28 April as she sank Kamakura Maru, a former ocean liner, southwest of Pucio Point, Panay (now Poblacion, Libertad, Antique), Philippines. The 17,526-ton transport was the largest Japanese transport, and one of the largest enemy ships sunk by an American submarine. Special operations interrupted Gudgeon's patrol as she landed six trained guerrilla fighters and three tons of equipment for the guerrilla movement on Panay on 30 April.

After sinking the 500-ton trawler Naku Maru with her deck guns west of Panay 4 May, Gudgeon battle-surfaced again that same day and left a coastal steamer burning and settling. Eight days later, on 12 May, she torpedoed and sank the 5861-ton freighter Sumatra Maru off Bulusan, Luzon, Philippines. Returning to Pearl Harbor, the veteran submarine was sent to San Francisco, California, for badly needed overhaul, her first since commissioning two years earlier.

=== Ninth and tenth patrols ===
A refreshed sub and crew departed Pearl Harbor for their ninth war patrol 1 September 1943 in the Mariana Islands area. Before returning to Midway Island on 6 October with all torpedoes expended, Gudgeon had sunk the 3158-ton Taian Maru, torpedoed and damaged the 3266-ton auxiliary gunboat Santo Maru north of Saipan, as well as seriously damaging several other ships.

Heading along the China coast for her tenth war patrol, from 31 October to 11 December, Gudgeon chalked up two more marus. Early in the morning of 23 November she spotted a convoy of four ships in the East China Sea some 70 miles north of Shusan Island and closed for attack. Gudgeon fired a spread of six torpedoes with gratifying results. The 870-ton escort Wakamiya, hit by one torpedo, broke in two, sinking almost immediately. The two tankers in the convoy, the 5106-ton Ichiyo Maru and the 8469-ton Goyo Maru, were also hit but managed to escape. Gudgeon closed in to finish off the 6783-ton troop transport Nekka Maru.

=== Eleventh patrol ===
Gudgeon's 11th war patrol saw a few successful sinkings of Japanese vessels, the first on 11 February. Before this sinking the submarine had a spell of bad luck where, on 2 February 1944, she had sighted a damaged aircraft carrier with two escorts. Gudgeon had closed for attack, but the escorts spotted her and attacked. A down-the-throat shot with four torpedoes temporarily discouraged the destroyers and allowed Gudgeon to seek deep water and safety, but when she surfaced the Japanese men-of-war were gone. Later in the same patrol Gudgeon was forced to try another down-the-throat shot at an enemy escort, but no hits. Success came only on 11 February. This date saw her torpedoing and sinking the already damaged (by Chinese air attack) 3091-ton merchant Satsuma Maru off Wenzhou, China. On 17 February Gudgeon sank a Japanese sampan with gunfire in the East China Sea, another sampan being damaged in the attack. She returned to Pearl Harbor on 5 March 1944.

=== Twelfth patrol and loss ===
Gudgeon sailed for her 12th war patrol on 4 April 1944. The submarine stopped off for fuel at Johnston Island on 7 April, and was never seen or heard from again. On 7 June 1944, Gudgeon was officially declared overdue and presumed lost. Uboat.net claims Gudgeon was sunk 18 April 1944 at a known location by the Japanese southeast of Iwo Jima. Some sources say the submarine was more likely to have sunk by attack near the Maug Islands.

== Tally and awards ==
During her three-year career, Gudgeon scored 14 confirmed kills of a total of well over 71,372 tons sunk, placing her 15th on the honor roll of American submarines.

- Presidential Unit Citation for her first eight war patrols
- American Defense Service Medal with "FLEET" clasp
- Asiatic-Pacific Campaign Medal with 11 battle stars
- World War II Victory Medal

== Legacy ==
On 21 November 1952 the Tang class submarine USS Gudgeon (SS-567) was placed in commission. The second Gudgeon served in the United States Pacific Fleet until 30 September 1983 when she was transferred to the Turkish Navy and renamed TCG Hızırreis (S 342). TCG Hızırreis served until 2004, when she was decommissioned and became a museum ship.
