= Japanese oiler Tōhō Maru (1936) =

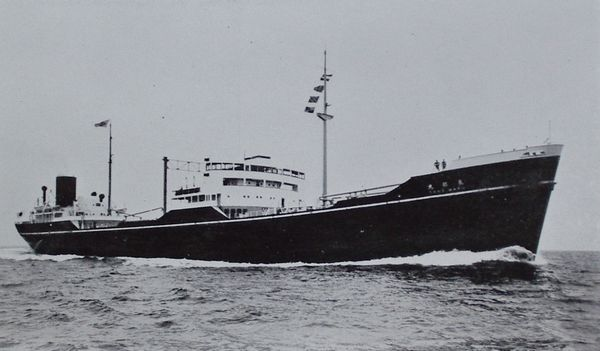
- Toho Maru

History
- Name: Tōhō Maru
- Builder: Kawasaki Shipyards
- Laid down: 1 May 1936
- Launched: 31 October 1936
- Completed: 24 December 1936
- Acquired: by requisition, 20 August 1941
- Fate: Sunk by torpedo, 29 March 1943

General characteristics
- Tonnage: 10,000 GRT
- Length: 503 ft (153 m)
- Beam: 65 ft (20 m)
- Draught: 37 ft (11 m)
- Propulsion: 1 × Kawasaki diesel engine, 8,600 hp (6,413 kW)
- Speed: 19.5 knots (36.1 km/h; 22.4 mph)
- Capacity: approx. 12,700 tons of crude oil
- Armament: 1 × 4.7 in (120 mm) gun

Tōhō Maru was an oiler of the Imperial Japanese Navy (IJN). The ship was launched as a civilian oil tanker for Iino Kaiun Kaisha on 1 May 1936. On 20 August 1941 the ship was requisitioned by the IJN and converted into a fleet replenishment oiler. The ship subsequently served Japan during the Pacific Campaign of World War II. On 29 March 1943 the ship was torpedoed and sunk in the Makassar Strait at 00°00′N 118°19′E by the United States Navy submarine USS Gudgeon.

== See also ==
Foreign commerce and shipping of Empire of Japan
