= Mark 10 torpedo =

- Type: Anti-surface ship torpedo
- Place of origin: United States

Service history
- In service: 1915–1945
- Used by: United States Navy
- Wars: World War II

Production history
- Designer: E. W. Bliss Company and Naval Torpedo Station
- Designed: 1915
- Manufacturer: Naval Torpedo Station
- Variants: Mod 3

Specifications
- Mass: 2215 pounds
- Length: 195 inches
- Diameter: 21 inches
- Effective firing range: 3500 yards
- Warhead: Mk 10 Mod 3, TNT
- Warhead weight: 497 pounds
- Detonation mechanism: Mk 3 contact exploder
- Engine: Steam turbine
- Propellant: Alcohol
- Maximum speed: 36 knots
- Guidance system: gyro, straight running
- Launch platform: Submarines

The Mark 10 torpedo was a torpedo put into use by the United States in 1915. It was derived from the Mark 9 aircraft torpedo converted to submarine use. It was used as the primary torpedo in the R- and S-class submarines. (Seven of the R class, R-21 through R-27, were equipped with 18-inch torpedo tubes, but were decommissioned in 1924 and 1925.) It used alcohol-water steam turbine propulsion. It was succeeded by the problematic Mark 14 torpedo, but remained in service in S-boats and fleet submarines through the Pacific War. The Mark 10 featured the largest warhead (497 lb, 225 kg of TNT) of any U.S. torpedo developed at that time. Stockpiles of Mark 10 Mod 3 torpedoes were used extensively during the first part of World War II due to short supply of the newer and longer (246 in, 6.2 m) Mark 14s, with some fleet submarines carrying a mixture of both types on patrol.

Mark 10 torpedoes, and those developed at the same time (Mark 9 air- and Mark 8 surface ship-launched) used essentially the same control package (the Ulan gear) as the newer Mark 14 for depth and direction. The running depth could be set to between 5 and 35 m (16 and 115 ft). The gyro angle could be set for a new course up to 90 degrees port or starboard from the current course of the submarine before launch. The Mark 10 would run out of the tube straight ahead for the "reach", then turn to a new, pre-set course, through a total angular targeting of 180 degrees over the end of the submarine, and then run on this intercept course straight to the target.

To use a Mark 10 Mod 3 (the earlier Mark 10 torpedo mod numbers would not work) torpedo in fleet submarine tubes required a gyro angle setting spindle adapter be slipped into the torpedo housing to extend the reach of the spindle into the torpedo. In pre-fleet submarines, the gyro setting machinery was on the outside of the tube, while the fleet submarine gyro spindles are on the inside of the tube.

The Mark 10 torpedo had the same "deep running" problem (where actual running depth was greater than that set before launch) as the Mark 14. By January 5, 1942 the Bureau of Ordnance informed Commander, Submarines, Pacific Fleet the Mark 10 torpedoes ran four feet deeper than set. Because the Mark 10 used Mark 3-1 and Mark 3-3 exploder mechanism with contact-only firing, it suffered none of the problems with prematures or duds the Mark 14 did. However, for a short period at the beginning of the war, the Mark 10 was viewed as more reliable, and in some cases preferred over the Mark 14.

The Mark 10 torpedo was withdrawn from service with the retirement of the R and S classes in late 1945. The last R-class submarine was decommissioned in September 1945. All but one of the S-class submarines were decommissioned by December 1945. The last S-class submarine, USS S-15, was decommissioned in June 1946.

== See also ==
- American 21-inch torpedo
