= List of ship launches in 1935 =

The list of ship launches in 1935 includes a chronological list of some ships launched in 1935.

	Ship	Class	Builder	Location	Country	Notes
12 January	Australia Star	Refrigerated cargo ship	Harland & Wolff	Belfast	United Kingdom	For Blue Star Line.
16 January	Potsdam	Ocean liner	Blohm & Voss	Hamburg	Germany	For Hamburg America Line
23 January	Dale	Farragut-class destroyer	Brooklyn Navy Yard	Brooklyn, New York	United States	
2 February	Casabianca	Redoutable-class submarine			France	
6 February	Baron Renfrew	Cargo ship	Harland & Wolff	Belfast	United Kingdom	For H. Hogarth & Sons.
7 February	Calabar	Passenger ship	Harland & Wolff	Belfast	United Kingdom	For Elder Dempster.
19 February	San Arcadio	Tanker	Harland & Wolff	Belfast	United Kingdom	For Eagle Oil and Shipping Company.
21 February	Rothesay Castle	Refrigerated cargo ship	Harland & Wolff	Belfast	United Kingdom	For Union-Castle Line.
6 March	Saganaga	Cargo ship	Harland & Wolff	Belfast	United Kingdom	For Christian Salvesen.
7 March	Duke of York	Ferry	Harland & Wolff	Belfast	United Kingdom	For London, Midland and Scottish Railway.
11 March	De Ruyter	De Ruyter-class cruiser	Wilton-Fijenoord	Schiedam	Netherlands	
28 March	Yarra	Grimsby-class sloop	Cockatoo Island Dockyard	Sydney	Australia	
March	Rapana	Tanker	Wilton-Fijenoord	Schiedam	Netherlands	For N.V. Petroleum Maatschappij La Corona.
5 April	Shiratsuyu	Shiratsuyu-class destroyer	Sasebo Naval Arsenal	Sasebo	Japan	
11 April	Talisman	Motor paddle ferry	A. & J. Inglis Ltd.	Glasgow	United Kingdom	For London and North Eastern Railway.
16 May	Krossfonn	Tanker	Odense Steel Shipyard	Odense, Denmark	Norway	
18 May	Shigure	Shiratsuyu-class destroyer	Uraga Dock Company	Uraga	Japan	
21 May	Shark	Porpoise-class submarine	Electric Boat Company	Groton, Connecticut	United States	
May	Tannenberg	Fishing trawler	Deschimag Seebeckwerft	Wesermünde	Germany	For Nordsee Deutsche Hochseefischerei Bremen-Cuxhaven AG
1 June	Shōhō	Zuihō-class aircraft carrier	Yokosuka Naval Arsenal	Yokosuka	Japan	
19 June	Quincy	New Orleans-class cruiser	Bethlehem Shipbuilding Company	Quincy, Massachusetts	United States	
20 June	Pike	Porpoise-class submarine	Portsmouth Naval Shipyard	Kittery, Maine	United States	
20 June	Porpoise	Porpoise-class submarine	Portsmouth Naval Shipyard	Kittery, Maine	United States	
20 June	Murasame	Shiratsuyu-class destroyer	Fujinagata Shipyard	Osaka	Japan	
June	Ostpreussen	Fishing trawler	Deschimag Seebeckwerft	Wesermünde	Germany	For Nordsee Deutsche Hochseefischerei Bremen-Cuxhaven AG
3 July	Inventor	Cargo ship	Harland & Wolff	Belfast	United Kingdom	For T. & J. Harrison.
6 July	Samidare	Shiratsuyu-class destroyer	Uraga Dock Company	Uraga	Japan	
17 July	Marseillaise	La Galissonnière-class cruiser	Ateliers et Chantiers de la Loire	Nantes	France	
18 July	Phelps	Porter-class destroyer	Bethlehem Shipbuilding Company	Quincy, Massachusetts	United States	
22 July	Glowworm	G-class destroyer	John I. Thornycroft & Company	Woolston, Hampshire	United Kingdom	
31 July	Jean de Vienne	La Galissonnière-class cruiser	Arsenal de Lorient	Lorient	France	
15 August	Stirling Castle	Passenger ship	Harland & Wolff	Belfast	United Kingdom	For Union-Castle Line.
15 August	Grenville	G-class destroyer	Yarrow Shipbuilding Company	Scotstoun, Glasgow	United Kingdom	
15 August	Greyhound	G-class destroyer	Vickers Armstrong	Barrow-in-Furness	United Kingdom	
15 August	Griffin	G-class destroyer	Vickers Armstrong	Barrow-in-Furness	United Kingdom	
18 August	Leberecht Maass	Type 1934-class destroyer	Deutsche Werke	Kiel	Germany	
18 August	Georg Thiele	Type 1934-class destroyer	Deutsche Werke	Kiel	Germany	
August	Tonina	Barge	Alabama Drydock and Shipbuilding Company	Mobile, Alabama	United States	For CN San Cristobal SA.
4 September	Tarpon	Porpoise-class submarine	Electric Boat Corporation	Groton, Connecticut	United States	
14 September	Case	Mahan-class destroyer	Boston Navy Yard	Boston, Massachusetts	United States	
18 September	Grafton	G-class destroyer	John I. Thornycroft & Company	Woolston, Hampshire	United Kingdom	
21 September	Harusame	Shiratsuyu-class destroyer	Maizuru Naval Arsenal	Maizuru	Japan	
26 September	Empire Star	Refrigerated cargo ship	Harland & Wolff	Belfast	United Kingdom	For Blue Star Line.
26 September	Gallant	G-class destroyer	Alexander Stephen and Sons	Glasgow	United Kingdom	
28 September	Flusser	Mahan-class destroyer	Federal Shipbuilding and Drydock Company	Kearny, New Jersey	United States	
28 September	Gloire	La Galissonnière-class cruiser	Forges et Chantiers de la Gironde	Lormont	France	
2 October	Dunkerque	Dunkerque-class battleship	Arsenal de Brest	Brest	France	
15 October	Clark	Porter-class destroyer	Bethlehem Shipbuilding Corporation	Quincy, Massachusetts	United States	
15 October	Mahan	Mahan-class destroyer	United Dry Docks	Staten Island, New York	United States	
15 October	Penelope	Arethusa-class cruiser	Harland & Wolff	Belfast	United Kingdom	For Royal Navy.
24 October	Garland	G-class destroyer	Fairfield Shipbuilding and Engineering	Govan, Glasgow	United Kingdom	
26 October	Montcalm	La Galissonnière-class cruiser	Forges et chantiers de la Méditerranée	La Seyne	France	
28 October	Cassin	Mahan-class destroyer	Philadelphia Navy Yard	Philadelphia, Pennsylvania	United States	
28 October	Shaw	Mahan-class destroyer	Philadelphia Navy Yard	Philadelphia, Pennsylvania	United States	
7 November	Gipsy	G-class destroyer	Fairfield Shipbuilding and Engineering	Govan, Glasgow	United Kingdom	
5 November	Friedrich Ihn	Type 1934A-class destroyer	Blohm & Voss	Hamburg	Germany	
12 November	Grenade	G-class destroyer	Alexander Stephen and Sons	Glasgow	United Kingdom	
13 November	R.P. Resor	Oil tanker	Federal Shipbuilding and Drydock Company	Kearny, New Jersey	United States	For Standard Oil Company of New Jersey
26 November	Sonavati	Ferry	Harland & Wolff	Belfast	United Kingdom	For Bombay Steam Navigation Co.
28 November	Athlone Castle	Passenger ship	Harland & Wolff	Belfast	United Kingdom	For Union-Castle Line.
30 November	Max Schultz	Type 1934-class destroyer	Deutsche Werke	Kiel	Germany	
30 November	Richard Beitzen	Type 1934-class destroyer	Deutsche Werke	Kiel	Germany	
3 December	Macoma	Tanker	N.V. Nederlandsche Scheepsvaarts Maatschappi	Amsterdam	Netherlands	For N.V. Petroleum Maatschappij La Corona.
11 December	Cummings	Mahan-class destroyer	United Shipyards	Staten Island, New York	United States	
11 December	Moffett	Porter-class destroyer	Bethlehem Shipbuilding Corporation	Quincy, Massachusetts	United States	
12 December	Kanimbala	Passenger ship	Harland & Wolff	Belfast	United Kingdom	For McIlwraith & MacEachern Ltd.
12 December	Porter	Porter-class destroyer	New York Shipbuilding Corporation	Camden, New Jersey	United States	
12 December	Ro-34	Kaichū VI-type submarine	Mitsubishi	Kobe	Japan	For Imperial Japanese Navy
23 December	Sōryū	Sōryū-class aircraft carrier	Kure Naval Arsenal	Kure	Japan	
31 December	Cushing	Mahan-class destroyer	Puget Sound Navy Yard	Bremerton, Washington	United States	
31 December	Perkins	Mahan-class destroyer	Puget Sound Navy Yard	Bremerton, Washington	United States	
Date unknown	Adrian	Cargo ship	Nordseewerke	Emden	Germany	For Motorschiff Adrian GmbH
Date unknown	Camroux II	Coaster	James Pollock & Sons	Faversham	United Kingdom	For Newcastle Coal & Shipping Co. Ltd.
Date unknown	Catania	Cargo ship	Neptun AG.	Rostock	Germany	For R. M. Sloman Jr.
Date unknown	Düsseldorf	Cargo ship	Bremer Vulkan Schiff- und Maschinenbau	Bremen	Germany	For Norddeutscher Lloyd.
Date unknown	Florence	Tank barge	Alabama Drydock and Shipbuilding Company	Mobile, Alabama	United States	For Hyer Towing Co.
Date unknown	Heimat	Schooner	Flender Werke	Lübeck	Germany	For Hugo Rubarth
Date unknown	Krischan III	Krischan-class seaplane tender	Norderwerft Koser und Meyer	Hamburg	Germany	For the Luftwaffe
Date unknown	Liselotte Essberger	Tanker	H. C. Stulcken Sohn.	Hamburg	Germany	For J. T. Essberger.
Date unknown	Masuren	cargo ship	Schichau GmbH Abt. Schiffswerft	Danzig	(Free City of Danzig) Danzig	For Kohlen-Import & Poseidon Schiffahrt AG. Königsberg
Date unknown	Mpasa	Coaster	Harland & Wolff	Belfast	United Kingdom	For Nyasaland Railways.
Date unknown	Neuss	Cargo ship	Howaldtswerke.	Hamburg	Germany	For Schiffarts-und-Assekuranz G.m.b.H.
Date unknown	ODA 1	barge	Alabama Drydock and Shipbuilding Company	Mobile, Alabama	United States	For United States Army Corps of Engineers.
Date unknown	ODA 2	Barge	Alabama Drydock and Shipbuilding Company	Mobile, Alabama	United States	For United States Army Corps of Engineers.
Date unknown	Pontos	Cargo ship	Bremer Vulkan Schiff- und Maschinenbau.	Bremen	Germany	For F. Laeisz.
Date unknown	Roach	Modified Warrior-type tug	Scott & Sons Ltd.	Bowling	United Kingdom	For Government of Palestine.
Date unknown	Roxburgh	Cargo ship	Burntisland Shipbuilding Co. Ltd.	Burntisland	United Kingdom	For private owner.
Date unknown	Warrior	Warrior-type tug	Scott & Sons Ltd.	Bowling	United Kingdom	For Steel & Bennie Ltd.
Date unknown	Trusty	Steamship	Turner Boat Works at Coal Harbour	Vancouver, British Columbia	Canada	
Date unknown	Wilhelm Traber	Cargo ship	Flensburger Schiff- Gesellschaft.	Flensburg	Germany	For W. Traber & Co.
Date unknown	No. 6	Derrick boat	Alabama Drydock and Shipbuilding Company	Mobile, Alabama	United States	For United States Army Corps of Engineers.
Date unknown	No. 7	Derrick boat	Alabama Drydock and Shipbuilding Company	Mobile, Alabama	United States	For United States Army Corps of Engineers.
Date unknown	No. 53	Barge	Alabama Drydock and Shipbuilding Company	Mobile, Alabama	United States	For United States Army Corps of Engineers.
