= USS Pike (SS-173) =

Submarine of the United States

Coordinates: 28°30′N 158°50′E

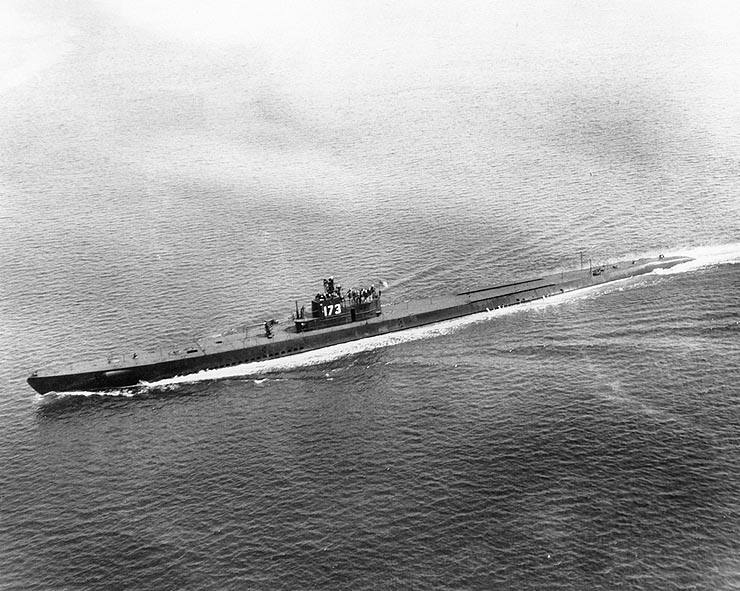
- USS Pike underway off New London, Connecticut, 5 May 1944

History

United States
- Builder: Portsmouth Naval Shipyard, Kittery, Maine
- Laid down: 20 December 1933
- Launched: 12 September 1935
- Commissioned: 2 December 1935
- Decommissioned: 15 November 1945
- Stricken: 17 February 1956
- Fate: Sold for breaking up, 14 January 1957

General characteristics
- Class & type: Porpoise-class diesel-electric submarine
- Displacement: 1,310 long tons (1,330 t) standard, surfaced, 1,934 long tons (1,965 t) submerged
- Length: 283 ft 0 in (86.26 m) (waterline), 301 ft 0 in (91.74 m) (overall)
- Beam: 24 ft 11 3/4 in (7.614 m)
- Draft: 13 ft 10 in (4.22 m)
- Propulsion: (as built) 4 × Winton Model 16-201A 16-cylinder two-cycle diesel engines, 1,300 hp (970 kW) each, driving electrical generators through reduction gears 2 × 120-cell Exide VL31B batteries, 4 × high-speed Elliott electric motors, total 2,085 hp (1,555 kW) 3 × General Motors six-cylinder four-cycle 6-228 auxiliary diesels, (re-engined 1942) 4 × GM two-cycle Model 12-278A diesels, 1,200 hp (890 kW) each, 2 shafts
- Speed: 19 knots (35 km/h) surfaced, 8 knots (15 km/h) submerged
- Range: 6,000 nautical miles (11,000 km) at 10 knots (19 km/h), 22,000 nautical miles (41,000 km) at 8 knots (15 km/h) with fuel in the main ballast tanks, (bunkerage 93,129 US gallons (352,530 L) maximum, 89,945 US gallons (340,480 L) typical, 1944)
- Endurance: 10 hours at 5 knots (9.3 km/h), 36 hours at minimum speed submerged
- Test depth: 250 ft (76 m)
- Complement: 5 officers, 9 chief petty officers, 42 enlisted (1944)
- Armament: 6 × 21 inch (533 mm) torpedo tubes (four forward, two aft, 16 torpedoes), (two external bow tubes added 1942), 1 × 3-in (76 mm)/50 cal deck gun, 2 × .30 cal (7.62 mm) machine guns

USS Pike (SS–173), a Porpoise-class submarine in the United States Navy, was laid down on 20 December 1933 by Portsmouth Navy Yard, in Kittery, Maine. She was launched on 12 September 1935, sponsored by Jane Logan Snyder, and commissioned on 2 December 1935.

== Service history ==
After a shakedown in the Atlantic, Pike departed Newport, Rhode Island on 10 February 1937, and proceeded via the Panama Canal to Naval Station San Diego. In 1937-1938, she participated in maneuvers near Hawaii. Entering Manila Bay on 1 December 1939, she served with Submarine Squadron 5 (SubRon 5) out of Cavite, Philippines, Departing on 20 June 1940, she cruised along the coast of China from Shanghai to Tsingtao, returning to Cavite on 24 August.

=== War patrol #1 ===
In response to the Japanese attack upon Pearl Harbor, she put to sea on 8 December, to guard sea lanes between Manila and Hong Kong.

=== War patrol #2 ===
Pike sailed from Manila on 31 December 1941.

On 1 January 1942 she sighted the hospital ship SS Mactan.

On 10 January she sighted USS Shark (SS-174).

On 12 January she sighted the Japanese minelayer Shirataka. Shirataka was heard "pinging" in the supersonic range.

On 18 January she possibly sighted the USS Salmon (SS-182), although there was no positive identification.

During this patrol she reported numerous aircraft sightings.

She moored at Port Darwin, Australia, 24 January 1942.

=== War patrol #3 ===
On her third war patrol from 5 February-28 March, she detected enemy craft off the Alor Islands on 20 and 24 February, and off Lombok Strait on the 28 February 1942.

=== War patrol #4 ===
On her fourth war patrol, she sailed from Fremantle, Western Australia, on 19 April, and patrolled north of the Palau Islands and off Wake Island, before reaching Honolulu on 25 May 1942.

=== War patrol #5 ===
From 30 May – 9 June 1942, she patrolled north of Oahu.

=== War patrol #6 ===
Overhauled at Mare Island Naval Shipyard, California, she guided bombers to Wake Island in December, and escaped a severe depth-charging on 14 January 1943 during an attempted attack off Japan.

=== War patrol #7 ===
Departing Pearl Harbor on 31 March 1943, she fired torpedoes at targets off Truk from 12–14 April, and shelled Satawan Island on the 25th.

=== War patrol #8 ===
Getting under way from Pearl Harbor on 22 July 1943 for her eighth war patrol, Pike sank 2,022-ton Japanese cargo ship Shoju Maru near Marcus Island 5 August.

On 6 August, Pike attacked and damaged a 22,500 ton Kasuga-class aircraft carrier under escort by a Fubuki-class destroyer.

On 22 August, Pike sighted a Japanese convoy consisting of six cargo vessels with a Chidori-class torpedo boat escort. Pike attacked the convoy at night, damaging two ships, one of which was determined to be a 2,500 ton Gosei-class freighter, the other was an unidentified 4,000 ton freighter.

Sailing from Pearl Harbor on 28 September, she arrived at New London, Connecticut, 3 November 1943. During the remainder of World War II, she trained submarine crews at the Naval Submarine Base New London.

== Decommissioned ==
Pike was decommissioned on 15 November 1945 at Boston, Massachusetts, she became a Naval Reserve training ship at Baltimore, Maryland, in September 1946. Upon completion of this duty, she was stricken from the Naval Vessel Register on 17 February 1956, and sold for scrapping on 14 January 1957.

== War patrol totals ==
Total number of ships damaged and sunk by Pike during her time in service:

War patrol number	Ships damaged; number and type	Ships sunk; number and type
1	0	0
2	0	0
3	0	0
4	0	0
5	0	0
6	0	0
7	2 - AK	0
8	2 - AK, 1 - ACV	1 - AO

== Awards ==
- Asiatic-Pacific Campaign Medal with four battle stars for World War II service
