= Japanese survey ship Hakuyo Maru =

- Pre-war photo of inspection and observation ship Hakuyo Maru

History

Empire of Japan
- Name: Hakuyo Maru
- Builder: Kawasaki Shipyard Co., Ltd.
- Laid down: 15 December 1928
- Launched: 6 August 1929
- Sponsored by: Ministry of Agriculture and Forestry
- Completed: 12 November 1929
- Acquired: Requisitioned by the Imperial Japanese Navy, 15 September 1942
- Homeport: Tokyo
- Identification: 35354
- Fate: Torpedoed and sunk, 20 March 1945
- Notes: Call sign: JFCC

General characteristics
- Displacement: 1,327 long tons (1,348 t) standard
- Length: 68.5 m (224 ft 9 in) o/a
- Beam: 10.9 m (35 ft 9 in)
- Draught: 6.1 m (20 ft 0 in)
- Installed power: 980 hp (731 kW)
- Propulsion: oil
- Armament: 1 x 93-type single machine gun

Hakuyo Maru (Japanese: 白鷹丸) was a Ministry of Agriculture and Forestry fisheries inspection and observation ship. It was requisitioned by the Imperial Japanese Navy during World War II for service primarily as an auxiliary survey vessel. It later served as a submarine chaser, cargo ship, and patrol boat.

== History ==
She was laid down on 15 December 1928 by the Kawasaki Shipyard Co., Ltd. (株式會社川崎造船所) at the behest of the Ministry of Agriculture and Forestry (農林省). She was launched on 6 August 1929, completed on 12 November 1929, and registered in Tokyo. The Lloyd's registry lists her as Hakuyo Maru but some western sources list her as Shirataka Maru apparently due to a different translation of her name in kanji.

On 10 June to 10 July 1937, Hakuyo Maru was part of a government authorized and funded exploratory fishing fleet to determine if the salmon fishery in Bristol Bay, Alaska was commercially viable. Other vessels in this fleet included Taihoku Maru, Toten Maru, and Taiyo Maru operated by the seafood company Hayashikane Shoten, K.K. The sudden appearance of the Japanese fishing fleet outraged American salmon fishermen. These fishermen raised the incident with their congressional representative, Anthony Dimond, setting off an international incident called the Bristol Bay salmon crisis. Although the Japanese fleet did not return after complaints from the U.S. government, this event escalated tensions on the eve of World War II.

On 15 September 1942, she was requisitioned by the Imperial Japanese Navy as a survey vessel tasked with taking soundings in the South China Sea and the Java Sea. On 14 December 1943, she briefly served as a cargo ship on the Truk to Rabaul route. On 1 February 1944, she was designated as a submarine chaser and reassigned to the Yokosuka Defense Force, Yokosuka Naval District.

On 20 March 1944, she was torpedoed and sunk by USS Pollack 50 kilometres (31 mi) northeast of Torishima at (30°40′N 140°42′E). 28 crew were killed in action. Submarine chaser CH-44 counterattacked, but was unsuccessful and USS Pollack escaped. She was struck from the Navy List on 30 November 1945.
