= USS Nautilus (SS-168) =

Submarine of the United States

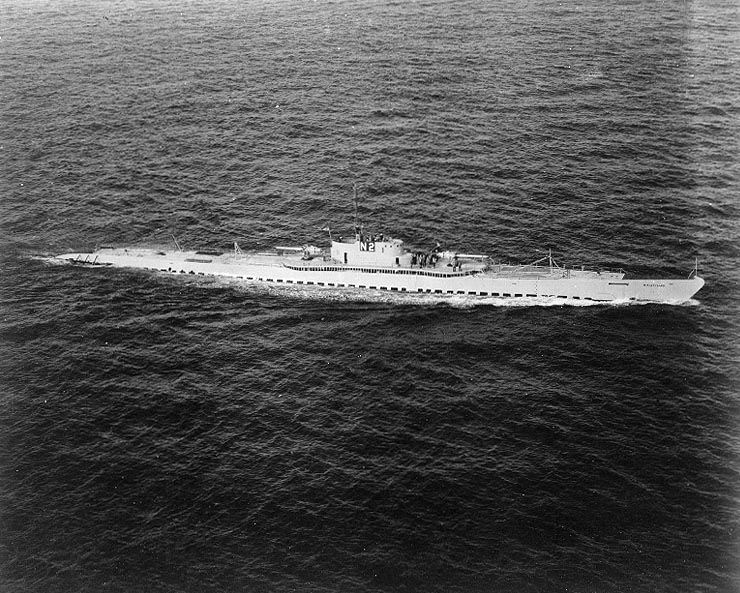
- USS Nautilus SS-168

History

United States
- Name: USS Nautilus
- Builder: Mare Island Naval Shipyard
- Laid down: 2 August 1927
- Launched: 15 March 1930
- Commissioned: 1 July 1930
- Decommissioned: 30 June 1945
- Stricken: 25 July 1945
- Fate: Sold for scrap, 16 November 1945

General characteristics
- Class & type: V-boat V-6 composite direct-drive diesel and diesel-electric submarine
- Displacement: 2,730 long tons (2,770 t) surfaced, standard; 3,900 tons (4,000 t) submerged
- Length: 349 ft (106 m) (waterline), 371 ft (113 m) (overall)
- Beam: 33 ft 3 1/4 in (10.141 m)
- Draft: 16 ft 11 1/4 in (5.163 m)
- Propulsion: As Built: 2 × BuEng-built, MAN-designed direct-drive main diesel engines, 2,350 hp (1,750 kW) each, 2 × BuEng MAN; 300 kW (400 hp) auxiliary diesel generators, 2 × 120-cell Exide ULS37 batteries, 2 × Westinghouse electric motors, 800 hp (600 kW) each; Re-engined 1941-42: 4 × General Motors Winton Model 16-278A 16-cylinder two-cycle diesel-electric diesel engines, 1,600 hp (1,200 kW) each, 2 × GM Winton 8-268A 2-cycle auxiliary diesel generators, 300 kW (400 hp) each, 2 × 120-cell Exide UHS39B batteries, 2 × Westinghouse electric motors, 1,270 hp (950 kW) each, Fairbanks-Morse reduction gears, 2 × shafts
- Speed: 17.4 knots (32.2 km/h) surfaced, trial; 14 knots (26 km/h) surfaced, service; 8 knots (15 km/h) submerged; 6.5 knots (12.0 km/h) submerged, service, 1939
- Range: 9,380 nautical miles (17,370 km) at 10 knots (19 km/h); 25,000 nautical miles (46,000 km) at 5.7 knots (10.6 km/h) with fuel in main ballast tanks
- Endurance: 10 hours at 5 knots (9 km/h); (bunkerage 178,460–182,778 US gallons (675,540–691,890 L); (as transport) 147,344 US gallons (557,758 L) diesel and 18,360 US gallons (69,500 L) gasoline
- Test depth: 300 ft (90 m)
- Complement: (as built) 9 officers, 10 petty officers, 70 enlisted; (1942) 9 officers, 88 enlisted; (1943) 8 officers, 80 enlisted
- Armament: 6 × 21-inch (533 mm) torpedo tubes (four forward, two aft; 24-26 internal torpedoes); (four external tubes {two each bow and stern, four torpedoes} added 1941-42; provision for 8-12 additional torpedoes externally) 2 × 6-inch (152 mm)/53 caliber Mark XII Mod. 2 wet type deck guns

USS Nautilus (SF-9/SS-168), a Narwhal-class submarine, a very large cruiser submarine and one of the "V-boats", was the third ship of the United States Navy to bear the name.

== Construction and commissioning ==
Nautilus was originally named and designated V-6 (SF-9), but was redesignated and given hull classification symbol SC-2 on 11 February 1925. Her keel was laid on 10 May 1927 by the Mare Island Naval Shipyard of Vallejo, California. She was launched on 15 March 1930 sponsored by Miss Joan Keesling, and commissioned on 1 July 1930. It was the first of many submarines built at Mare Island CA.

== Design ==
The configuration of V-4, V-5, and V-6 resulted from an evolving strategic concept that increasingly emphasized the possibility of a naval war with Japan in the far western Pacific. This factor, and the implications of the 1922 Washington Naval Treaty, suggested the need for long-range submarine "cruisers", or "strategic scouts", as well as long-range minelayers, for which long endurance, not high speed, was most important. The design was possibly influenced by the German "U-cruisers" of the Type U-139 and Type U-151 U-boat classes, although V-4, V-5, and V-6 were all larger than these. A raised gun platform was provided around the conning tower, and deck stowage for spare torpedoes was included under the platform and in the superstructure. V-6 and her near-sisters V-4 (Argonaut) and V-5 (Narwhal) were initially designed with larger and more powerful MAN-designed diesel engines than the Busch-Sulzer engines that propelled earlier V-boats, which were failures. Unfortunately, the specially built engines failed to produce their design power, and some developed dangerous crankcase explosions. The engineering plant was replaced in 1941-42.

The as-built engine specifications were two BuEng-built, MAN-designed direct-drive 10-cylinder 4-cycle main diesel engines, 2,350 hp (1,750 kW) each, with two BuEng MAN 4-cycle 6-cylinder auxiliary diesel engines, 450 hp (340 kW) each, driving 300 kW (400 hp) electrical generators. The auxiliary engines were for charging batteries or for increased surface speed via a diesel-electric system providing power to the main electric motors.

Similar to her sister built at Portsmouth, V-6 was built to a partial welded/partial riveted construction method. Welding was used to join the vertical keel plates, and also in other non-critical areas like the superstructure, piping brackets, and support framing. The inner and outer hulls were still entirely riveted.

== Inter-war period ==
V-6 operated out of New London, conducting special submergence tests, until March 1931. She was renamed Nautilus on 19 February and given hull number SS-168 on 1 July. She proceeded to Pearl Harbor where she became flagship of Submarine Division 12 (SubDiv 12). Reassigned to SubDiv 13 at San Diego, California, 1935–1938, then re-homeported at Pearl Harbor, she maintained a regular schedule of training activities and fleet exercises and problems throughout the decade. In July 1941, she entered the Mare Island Naval Shipyard for modernization – radio equipment, external torpedo tubes (two bow and two stern-firing in the gun deck), re-engining (with four Winton diesels), and air conditioning.

== First patrol – the Battle of Midway ==
She departed San Francisco, California, on 21 April 1942, reaching Pearl Harbor on 28 April. On 24 May, Nautilus (commanded by Lieutenant Commander William H. Brockman Jr.) got underway for her first war patrol, to Midway Island to help repel the expected attack by the Japanese fleet.

At 07:55, 4 June, while approaching the northern boundary of her patrol area near Midway Island, she sighted masts on the horizon. Japanese planes sighted the submarine at the same time and began strafing. After diving to 100 feet (30 m), she continued observation. At 08:00, a formation of four enemy ships was sighted: the battleship Kirishima, the cruiser Nagara, and two destroyers (misidentified, as they often were early in the war, as cruisers) in company. Within minutes the submarine was again sighted from the air and was bombed. Two of the "cruisers" closed for a kill and nine depth charges were dropped at a distance of about 1,000 yards (910 m).

When the attack ceased, Nautilus rose to periscope depth. Ships surrounded her. Sighting on Kirishima, she fired two bow tubes; one misfired, one missed. At 08:30, a destroyer immediately headed for the boat, which dived to 150 feet (46 m) to wait out the depth charge attack. At 08:46, periscope depth was again ordered. The cruiser and two of the destroyers were now out of range; echo ranging by the third appeared too accurate for comfort. At 09:00, the periscope was raised again and an aircraft carrier was sighted. Nautilus changed course to close for an attack. The enemy destroyer followed suit and at 09:18 attacked with six depth charges.

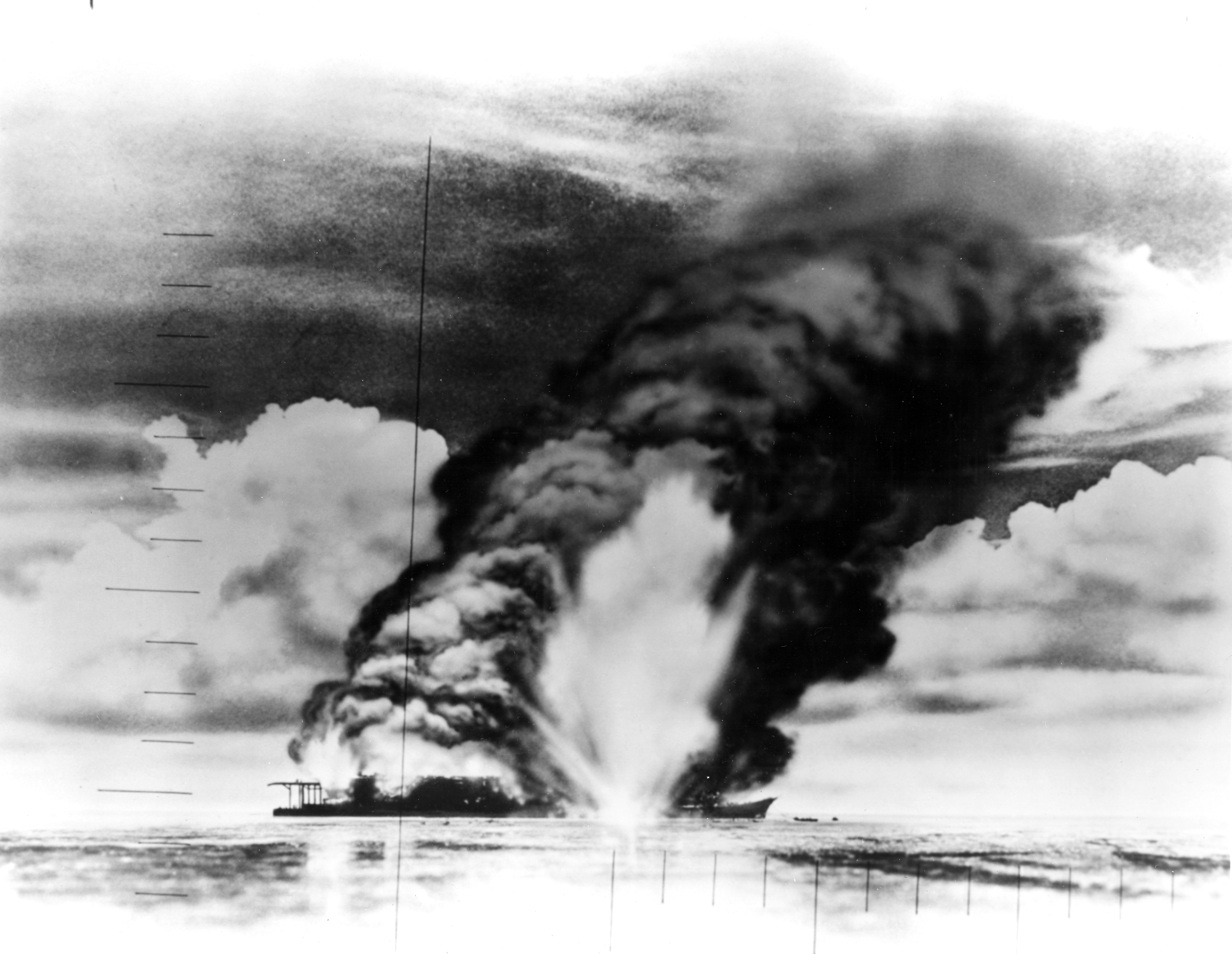
Diorama simulating periscope view from Nautilus, attacking a Japanese aircraft carrier at the Battle of Midway.

By 09:55 echo ranging ceased and Nautilus raised her periscope. The carrier, her escorts, and the attacking destroyer had disappeared. (Unbeknownst to her skipper at the time, the counter-attacking Japanese destroyer Arashi, in her rush to rejoin the carrier, was tracked by Enterprise's VB-6, led by Wade McClusky, back to the Japanese task force.) At 12:53, a damaged aircraft carrier with two escorts was sighted. The carrier was identified as Sōryū, but later research suggests it was probably Kaga. An hour later, Nautilus had moved into attack position. Between 13:59 and 14:05, after the battle was largely over, Nautilus launched four torpedoes at the carrier from less than 3,000 yards (2,700 m). One failed to run, two ran erratically, and the fourth was a dud (a familiar problem for the Mark XIV), impacting amidships and breaking in half. Nautilus reported flames appeared along the length of the ship as the first hit, and the skeleton crew which had been aboard (survivors of which reported no torpedo hit) began going over the side, with the air flask of the dud torpedo acting as a life preserver for Japanese sailors.

Nautilus went to 300 feet (91 m) as a prolonged depth charge attack commenced. At 16:10, the submarine rose to periscope depth. The carrier, burning along her entire length, had been abandoned. At 19:41, Nautilus resumed her patrol, having expended five torpedoes and survived 42 depth charges, but accomplished little of substance. (Not until much later was the importance of her attack on the battleship, and its connection to McClusky, recognized.) Brockman was awarded a Navy Cross for his actions.

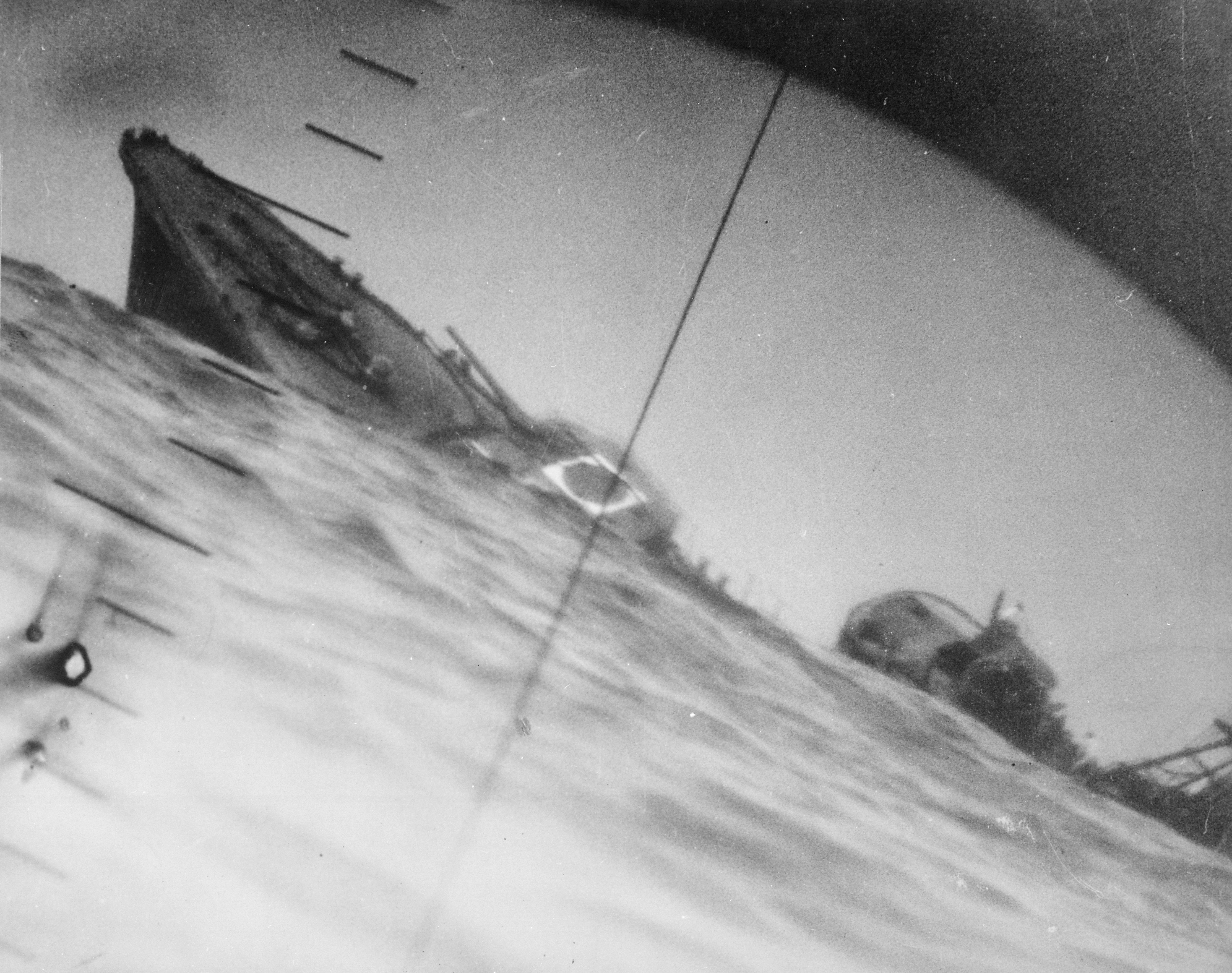
Yamakaze sinks after being torpedoed

Between 7 June and 9 June, Nautilus replenished at Midway Island and then resumed her patrol to the west. By 20 June, she was operating off Honshū at the northern end of the Tokyo-Marshall Islands supply route. On 22 June, she damaged a destroyer guarding the entrance to the Sagami Sea off Ōshima. Three days later, she sank the destroyer Yamakaze and damaged an oil tanker. On 27 June, she sent a sampan to the bottom and on 28 June, after damaging a merchantman, underwent her severest depth charging, which forced her back to Pearl Harbor for repairs, 11 July to 7 August.

== Second patrol – the Makin Raid ==
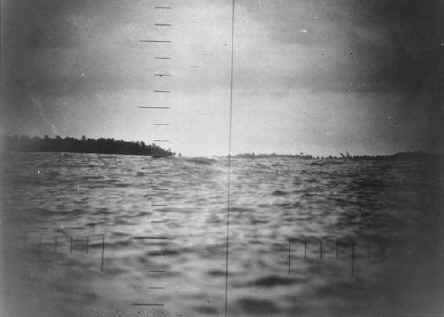
Makin Atoll periscopic view

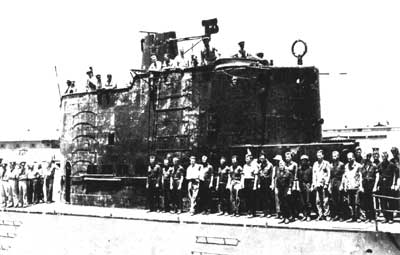
U.S. Marines arrive at Pearl Harbor, Hawaii on 26 August 1942 on board the U.S. submarine Nautilus following their raid on Makin Island

Nautilus departed Hawaiian waters for her second war patrol, a special troop transport mission of three weeks duration, 8 August. Sailing with submarine Argonaut and carrying the Second Raider Battalion under Lieutenant Colonel Evans F. Carlson (the Marine Raiders, or "Carlson's Raiders") she arrived off Makin Atoll on 16 August to stage a raid to divert Japanese attention from the Solomon Islands. Early the following morning, she sent the Raiders ashore on Butaritari Island in rubber boats rigged with outboard motors. At 07:03, she provided gunfire support against enemy positions at Ukiangong Point on Butaritari and shelled enemy ships in the lagoon, sinking two, a troop barge and a patrol boat. At 10:39, an enemy plane appeared and Nautilus dove. Two aerial attacks followed at 11:30 and at 12:55. The latter flight was made up of 12 planes, two of which landed in the lagoon to discharge troops. About 35 of the reinforcements made it to shore to fire on the Americans.

The Marines began to withdraw at 17:00. At 19:00, they launched their boats. Many were unable to clear the breakers without the aid of their damaged outboards. Only seven boats and less than 100 men returned that night. The remainder, less nine who were later captured and executed, discovered there were no Japanese left to fight and crossed to the lagoon side, whence they headed for the submarine after nightfall on 18 August. Thinking all surviving marines were on board, Nautilus and Argonaut set course for Pearl Harbor, arriving 25 August.

== 3rd–5th patrols, September 1942 – April 1943 ==
On her third war patrol, from 15 September to 5 November, Nautilus returned to Japanese waters to join the submarine blockade chain stretched from the Kurile Islands to the Nansei Shoto. Despite heavy seas, which precluded periscope use and torpedo firing during much of the patrol, and mechanical breakdowns, which impeded approaches to targets, she torpedoed and sank three marus (Japanese merchant ships) and, in surface action, destroyed three sampans to add over 12,000 tons to her score. On 12 October, however, the patrol became one of her more perilous, as she took a heavy depth charging. Two days later, her crew noticed a slight oil slick in her wake. The hindering seas now protected by breaking up the trace. By 19 October, the leak had enlarged considerably and on 20 October, the first relatively calm day since the depth charging, air leaks were discovered. Nautilus was leaving a trail for Japanese defense patrols. Moving to a quieter area, with less aerial activity, she continued her patrol until 24 October when she sank Kenun Maru, then headed for home without sighting enemy planes. She reached Midway Island 31 October, performed temporary repairs, and continued on to Pearl Harbor.

During her fourth patrol, conducted in the Solomon Islands from on 13 December 1942 to on 4 February 1943, Nautilus rescued 26 adults and three children from Teop Harbor on 31 December and 1 January, then added the cargo ship Yosinogawa Maru to her kills and damaged a tanker, a freighter, and a destroyer. On 4 February, she arrived at Brisbane, debarked her passengers, and sailed for Pearl Harbor. Arriving 15 April, she departed five days later heading north. On 27 April, she put into Dutch Harbor, Alaska, and commenced instructing the 7th Infantry Division Provisional Scout Battalion in amphibious landings. She then embarked 109 Scouts (including Alaskan Native scouts of the Alaska Territorial Guard) and on 1 May, headed for Attu. There, on 11 May, she landed her "passengers" five hours before the main assault.

== 6th–8th patrols, September 1943 – April 1944 ==
Overhaul at Mare Island occupied most of the summer and on 16 September Nautilus left Pearl Harbor to spend her sixth war patrol conducting photo-reconnaissance of the Gilbert Islands, concentrating on Tarawa, Kuma, Butaritari, Abemama, and Makin, all of which had been reinforced, particularly Tarawa, since the sub's 1942 excursion into those waters. The information, including continuous panoramic pictures of the coastlines and chart corrections, which she brought back to Pearl Harbor on 17 October, proved among the most useful intelligence gathered of the area prior to the invasion of Tarawa.

She returned to Tarawa 18 November to obtain last-minute information on weather and surf conditions, landing hazards and the results of recent bombardments. At 21:59 on 19 November, mistaking her for a Japanese submarine, the destroyer USS Ringgold (DD-500) fired at her while she was off Maiana in the Gilbert Islands at 01°05′N 173°03′E, hitting her at the base of her conning tower with a five-inch (127 mm) shell which did not explode but damaged the main induction valve. Diving as soon as the water depth permitted, Nautilus was rigged for depth charging and the damage control party went to work. Nautilus avoided further damage and suffered no casualties, but reached a depth of 310 feet (94 m) before her crew gained control of her. Within two hours repairs were sufficient to allow Nautilus to continue with her primary mission: landing a 78-man scouting party, composed of 5th Amphibious Reconnaissance Company Marines and an Australian scout, on Abemama.

At midnight 20–21 November, Nautilus lay 3,000 yards (2,700 m) off an island in the Abemama Atoll, Kenna to discharge her passengers. By 15:00, all were safely ashore. On the afternoon of 22 November, Nautilus provided fire support to bring the tiny (25-man) enemy garrison out of their bunkers. This proved accurate, killing 14; the remainder committed suicide. By the time the main assault force arrived on 26 November, Abemama had been secured and preparations to turn it into an air base for the Marshall Islands campaign had begun.

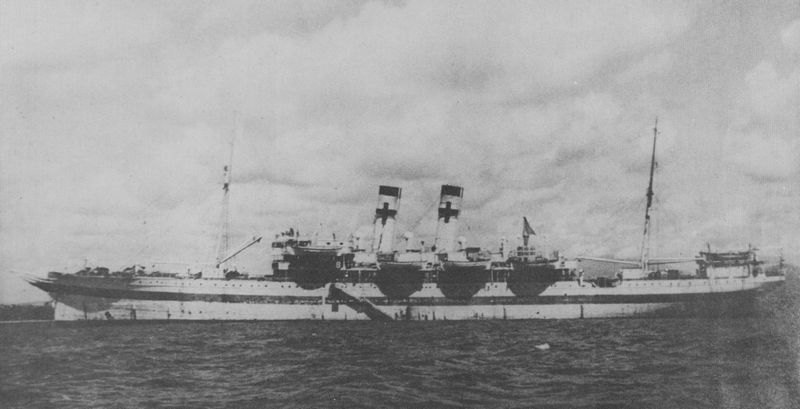
America Maru

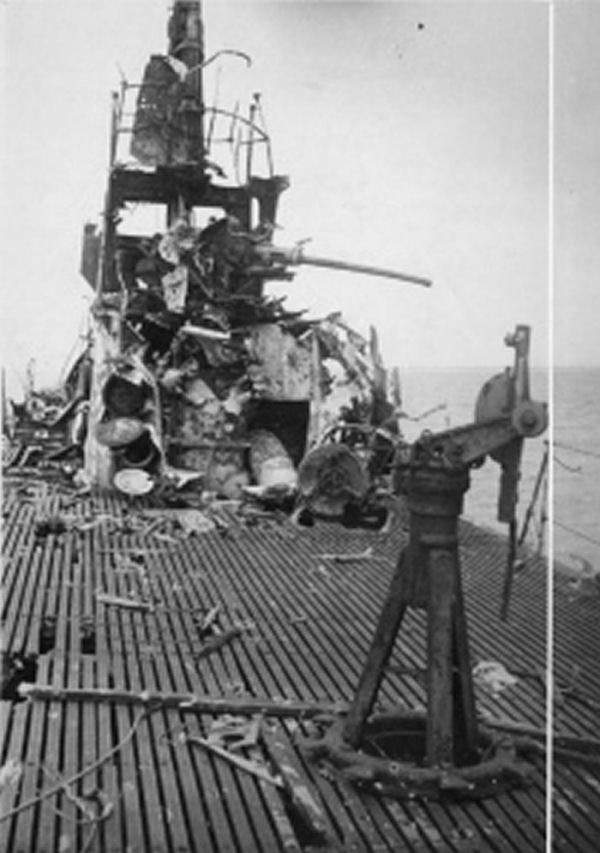
USS Darter Destruction on the deck after she was grounded and destroyed by shellfire on Bombay Shoal off Palawan

For actions during this mission, Commander William D. Irvin, Nautilus Commanding Officer, was awarded the Navy Cross.

Nautilus returned to Pearl Harbor on 4 December to prepare for her eighth war patrol. Conducted north of Palau and west of the Mariana Islands from 27 January. On 21 March 1944 she sank the ex-hospital ship America Maru (she had been reverted to a transport December 1943) and damaged three cargo ships. On 26 April, Nautilus sailed for Brisbane, whence she departed 29 May to begin a series of special missions in support of guerrilla and reconnaissance activities in the Philippines.

== 9th–14th patrols, May 1944 – January 1945 ==
On her ninth patrol, from 29 May to 11 June, she carried ammunition, oil, and dry stores to Philippine guerrillas under Colonel R.V. Bowler on Mindanao. Between 12 June and 27 June, she transported a similar cargo to Negros Island and embarked evacuees, including one German POW, for Darwin. During her 11th patrol, from 30 June to 27 July, she landed a reconnaissance party and 12 tons of stores on North Pandan Island, and more supplies to Colonel Kangleon on Leyte and Colonel Abcede on Mindanao. On her 12th, 13th and 14th patrols, she returned to the central Philippines, landed personnel and supplies at various points on Mindanao and Luzon, and carried evacuees to Australia. On 25 September, during the first of these three patrols, she grounded on Iuisan Shoal. Forced to lighten her load, her evacuees, mail, captured documents, and cargo were sent ashore. All secret materials were burned. Her reserve fuel tanks were blown dry, variable ballast was blown overboard and six-inch (152 mm) ammunition jettisoned. With the blowing of her main ballast tanks she was finally able to get off the reef within three and a half hours, despite the receding tide, and clear the area by dawn.

During her 13th patrol, on 31 October 1944, Nautilus finished off USS Darter, which had run aground on a reef and could not be recovered. Numerous attempts to torpedo the wreck had failed as torpedoes detonated on the reef. Nautilus's six-inch (152 mm) guns, however, scored 55 hits, and her report states, "It is doubtful that any equipment in Darter at 11:30 this date would be of any value to Japan – except as scrap."

Nautilus completed her 14th, and last, patrol at Darwin on 30 January 1945. From Australia, she was routed on to Philadelphia, Pennsylvania, where she arrived 25 May for inactivation. Decommissioned with a bottle of champagne over the forward 6 inch (152 mm) gun on 30 June, she was stricken from the Naval Vessel Register 25 July and sold 16 November, to the North American Smelting Company of Philadelphia, Pennsylvania, for scrapping.

== In popular culture ==
Season 2, Episode 26 of the American television series The Silent Service, first broadcast in 1958, dramatizes the Teop Harbor rescue of 24 December 1942.

Nautilus's actions during the Battle of Midway are depicted in the 2019 film Midway. In the film, the interior shots of Nautilus were actually filmed aboard USS Bowfin in Pearl Harbor.

The second mission in 2004's Medal of Honor: Pacific Assault features Nautilus as the submarine that transports the player and squad to the Raid on Makin Island. The end of the mission requires the player to defend the Nautilus from Japanese air attack using a BAR and then by using the submarine's own anti-aircraft weapons.

== Awards ==
- Presidential Unit Citation, for her aggressive war patrols in enemy-controlled waters.
- American Defense Service Medal
- Asiatic-Pacific Campaign Medal with 14 battle stars
- World War II Victory Medal
