= United States Porpoise-class submarine =

Class of US Navy submarine

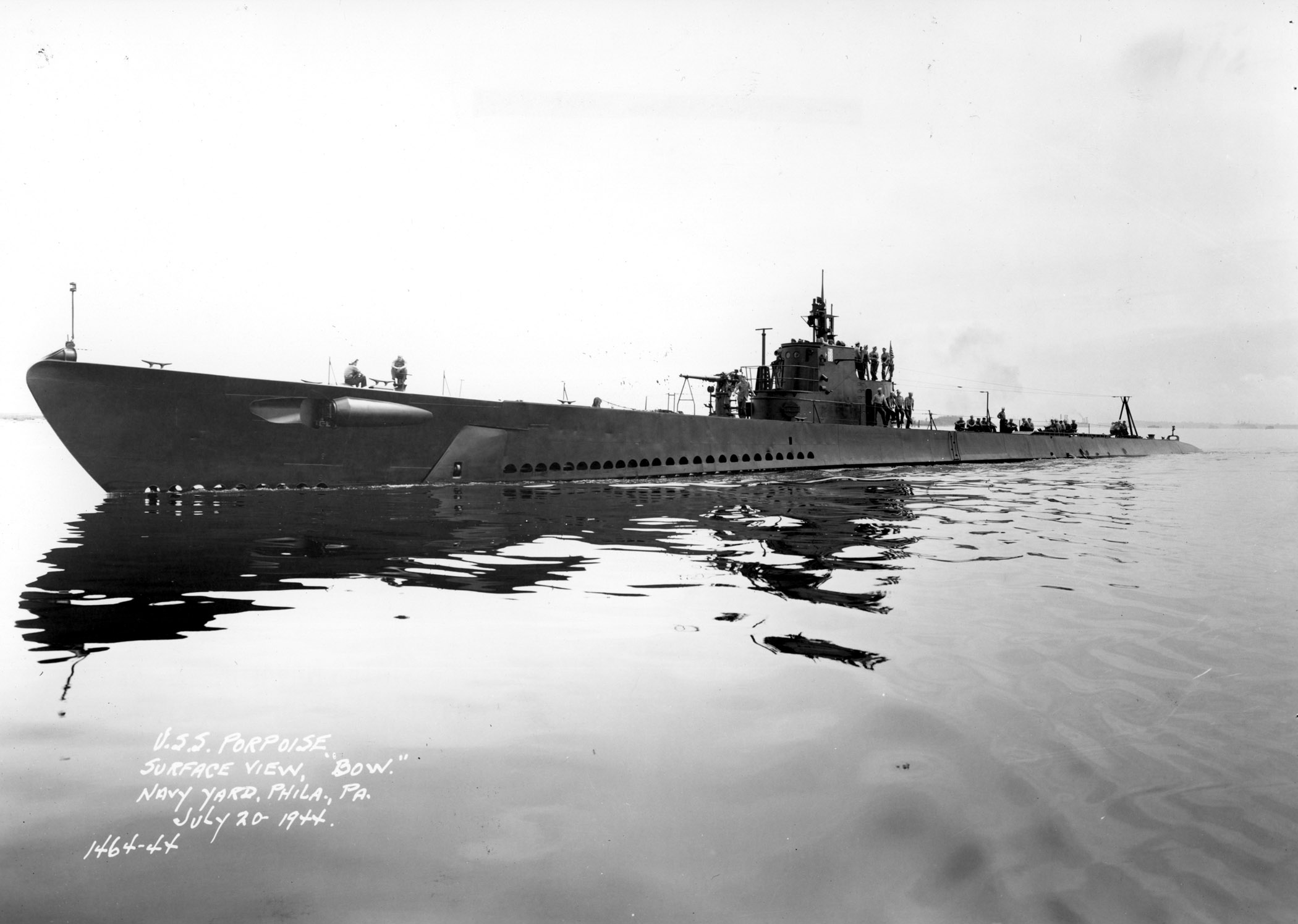
- USS Porpoise on 20 July 1944

Class overview
- Name: Porpoise class
- Builders: Electric Boat Company, Portsmouth Naval Shipyard, Mare Island Naval Shipyard
- Operators: United States Navy
- Preceded by: Cachalot class
- Succeeded by: Salmon class
- Built: 1933–1937
- In commission: 1935–1945
- Completed: 10
- Lost: 4
- Retired: 6

General characteristics P-1 Type
- Type: Diesel-electric submarine
- Displacement: 1,316 tons surfaced 1,934 tons submerged
- Length: 289 ft (88 m) (waterline); 301 ft (92 m) (overall)
- Beam: 24 ft 11 in (7.59 m)
- Draft: 14 ft 1 in (4.29 m) maximum
- Propulsion: 4 × Winton 16-201A diesel engines, 1,300 hp (970 kW) each, driving electrical generators; 4 × high-speed Elliott geared electric motors, 521 hp (389 kW) each; 2 × 120-cell Exide batteries; 3 × auxiliary diesel generators, 100 kW (130 hp) each; 2 shafts
- Speed: 18 knots (33 km/h) surfaced; 8 knots (15 km/h) submerged
- Range: SS-172-175: 6,000 nautical miles (11,000 km) surfaced at 10 knots (19 km/h); SS-176-181: 11,000 nautical miles (20,000 km) surfaced at 10 knots (19 km/h)
- Test depth: 250 ft (80 m)
- Complement: 54 -55
- Armament: 6 × 21 inch (533 mm) torpedo tubes; (four forward, two aft; 16 torpedoes); 1 × 3 inch (76mm)/50 caliber deck gun; 2 × .50-caliber (12.7 mm) machine guns; 4 × .30-caliber (7.62 mm) machine guns

The Porpoise class were submarines built for the United States Navy in the late 1930s, and incorporated a number of modern features that would make them the basis for the subsequent Salmon, Sargo, Tambor, Gato, Balao, and Tench classes. In some references, the Porpoises are called the "P" class.

== Design ==
The four submarines of the Porpoise and Shark groups were authorized for construction in Fiscal Year 1934. The two submarines of the Porpoise group were developed by the Bureau of Construction & Repair at the Portsmouth Navy Yard. It was a full double hull design that was essentially an enlarged Cachalot (SS-170). The two submarines of the Shark group were developed by Electric Boat and they were built to a partial double hull design with single hull ends, a refinement of an earlier hull type used on the Dolphin (SS-169). Six submarines of the Perch group were authorized for construction in Fiscal Year 1935. The Navy thought the Electric Boat design to be the better of the two, so all six boats were built to the partial double hull pioneered by Electric Boat. All ten submarines carried the same armament and propulsion machinery, and had the same operating characteristics and thus were considered to be the same class.

The five boats of this class built at the government owned Portsmouth Navy Yard and Mare Island Navy Yard were the last submarines in the USN to be built to a riveted construction method. While welding was used in non-critical areas, riveting was still used on the inner and outer hulls. Design conservatism and the economic realities of the Great Depression drove this decision by Portsmouth. The five boats built by Electric Boat were the first all welded submarines in the USN. All submarines built for the USN after this class by all yards were of all-welded construction.

In general, they were around 300 feet (91 m) long and diesel-electric powered. Displacement was 1,934 tons submerged for the first four boats, 1,998 tons for the later ones.

The goal of a 21-knot fleet submarine that could keep up with the standard-type battleships was still elusive. The relatively high surfaced speed of 18 knots (33 km/h) was primarily to improve reliability at lower cruising speeds. A major improvement essential in a Pacific war was an increase in range from Perch onwards, nearly doubling from 6,000 nautical miles (11,000 km) to 11,000 nautical miles (20,000 km) at 10 knots (19 km/h). This allowed extended patrols in Japanese home waters, and would remain standard through the Tench class of 1944.

Although it proved successful with improved equipment beginning with the Tambor class of 1940, the diesel-electric drive was troublesome at first. In this arrangement, the boat's four main diesel engines drove only electric generators, which supplied power to high-speed electric motors geared to the propeller shafts. The engines themselves were not connected to the propeller shafts. For submerged propulsion, massive storage batteries supplied electricity to the motors. Problems arose with flashover and arcing in the main electric motors. There was also a loss of 360 hp (270 kW) in transmission through the electrical system. The Winton Model 16-201A 16-cylinder diesels also proved problematic, and were eventually replaced with 12-278As. Pompano would be the sole boat of the class fitted with the Hooven-Owens-Rentschler Model 89DA, an innovative double acting diesel engine. Unfortunately, these engines gave Pompano considerable trouble due to excessive vibration and improperly forged gearing. A lack of funding for replacements forced the Navy to nurse the engines along until they could be replaced with Fairbanks-Morse 38A8 units in 1942.

Five of the class received an additional pair of external bow torpedo tubes, probably early in World War II: Porpoise, Pike, Tarpon, Pickerel, and Permit. The original Mark 6 3 inch (76 mm)/50 caliber deck gun was eventually replaced during the war by the Mark 21 model. The new gun provided a nominal anti-aircraft capability because it allowed high elevations, although this capability was rarely used in combat. Plunger received a Mark 9 4 inch (102 mm)/50 caliber gun during an overhaul in 1943. The boats also originally carried two water jacketed M2 Browning .50 caliber machine guns, with one mounted on the "cigarette deck" on the aft end of the conning tower fairwater and one on a mount on the main deck forward. These guns were taken below when the boat submerged.

These boats were all built with a large bulky conning tower fairwater with an enclosed (but free-flooding) wheelhouse and a surface steering station at the forward end. Two periscopes were fitted, one that let into the control room and one that let into the conning tower. The original 30 foot periscopes proved to be too short and were later replaced with 34 foot models.

== Boats in class ==
The Porpoise class consisted of the Porpoise group, the Shark group, and the Perch group subclasses:

Construction data for the Porpoise group submarines
| Name | Hull no. | Builder | Laid down | Launched | Comm. | Decomm. | Fate |
|---|---|---|---|---|---|---|---|
| Porpoise | SS-172 | Portsmouth Naval Shipyard | 27 Oct 1933 | 20 Jun 1935 | 15 Aug 1935 | 15 Nov 1945 | Reserve training ship; scrapped 1957 |
| Pike | SS-173 | Portsmouth Naval Shipyard | 20 Dec 1933 | 12 Sep 1935 | 2 Dec 1935 | 15 Nov 1945 | Reserve training ship; scrapped 1957 |

Construction data for the Shark group submarines
| Name | Hull no. | Builder | Laid down | Launched | Comm. | Decomm. | Fate |
|---|---|---|---|---|---|---|---|
| Shark | SS-174 | Electric Boat | 24 Oct 1933 | 21 May 1935 | 25 Jan 1936 | 11 Feb 1942 | Lost 11 Feb 1942, probably to gunfire from destroyer Yamakaze |
| Tarpon | SS-175 | Electric Boat | 22 Dec 1933 | 4 Sep 1935 | 12 Mar 1936 | 15 Nov 1945 | Reserve training ship; Sank while being Towed to scrapyard |

Construction data for the Perch group submarines
| Name | Hull no. | Builder | Laid down | Launched | Comm. | Decomm. | Fate |
|---|---|---|---|---|---|---|---|
| Perch | SS-176 | Electric Boat | 25 Feb 1935 | 9 May 1936 | 19 Nov 1936 | 3 Mar 1942 | Lost 3 Mar 1942 |
| Pickerel | SS-177 | Electric Boat | 25 Mar 1935 | 7 Jul 1936 | 26 Jan 1937 | Apr 1943 | Lost to enemy action Apr 1943 |
| Permit | SS-178 | Electric Boat | 6 Jun 1935 | 5 Oct 1936 | 17 Mar 1937 | 15 Nov 1945 | Scrapped 1958 |
| Plunger | SS-179 | Portsmouth Navy Yard | 17 Jul 1935 | 8 Jul 1936 | 19 Nov 1936 | 15 Nov 1945 | Reserve training ship; scrapped 1957 |
| Pollack | SS-180 | Portsmouth Navy Yard | 1 Oct 1935 | 15 Sep 1936 | 15 Jan 1937 | 21 Sep 1945 | Scrapped 1947 |
| Pompano | SS-181 | Mare Island Navy Yard | 14 Jan 1936 | 11 Mar 1937 | 12 Jun 1937 | Aug or Sep 1943 | Lost Aug or Sep 1943, possibly to enemy action on 17 Sep 1943 |

== Service ==
Following participation in exercises from 1937, all but three of the ten Porpoise class were forward deployed to the Philippines in late 1939. In October 1941 most of the front-line submarine force, including all sixteen Salmon and Sargo class boats, joined them. The Japanese occupation of southern Indo-China and the August 1941 American-British-Dutch retaliatory oil embargo had raised international tensions, and an increased military presence in the Philippines was felt necessary. The Japanese did not bomb the Philippines until 10 December 1941, so almost all of the submarines were able to get underway prior to the attack.

War experience showed that the boats were not optimized for combat. Armament needed to be upgraded and new technologies needed to be implemented. The conning tower fairwater in particular was deemed a liability as it was too large and easily sighted by the Japanese while surfaced. The Navy immediately authorized modification programs to address these issues. The conning tower fairwater was reduced in size in a fashion similar to the other fleet submarines, with both the forward and after sections cut away. This gave the fairwater a smaller, stepped appearance. Reducing the size of the fairwater also provided new platforms for mounting heavier machine guns, with two Oerlikon 20 mm cannons being mounted. An SD air search radar was mounted on an extendable mast on the forward edge of the conning tower fairwater, and an SJ surface search radar was added on a short mast on the bridge itself. As noted above the torpedo armament was upgraded on five of the boats, and improved engines were installed.

Two of the class were lost in Southeast Asian waters in early 1942, and another two were lost near Japan in 1943. By early 1945, all six surviving boats had been transferred to New London, Connecticut for training duties. Of these, four were used postwar as decommissioned reserve training submarines until they were scrapped in 1957.

== See also ==
- Allied submarines in the Pacific War
- Unrestricted submarine warfare
- Torpedo
- List of submarine classes of the United States Navy
- List of lost United States submarines
- List of submarines of the Second World War
