= USS Cuttlefish (SS-171) =

Submarine of the United States

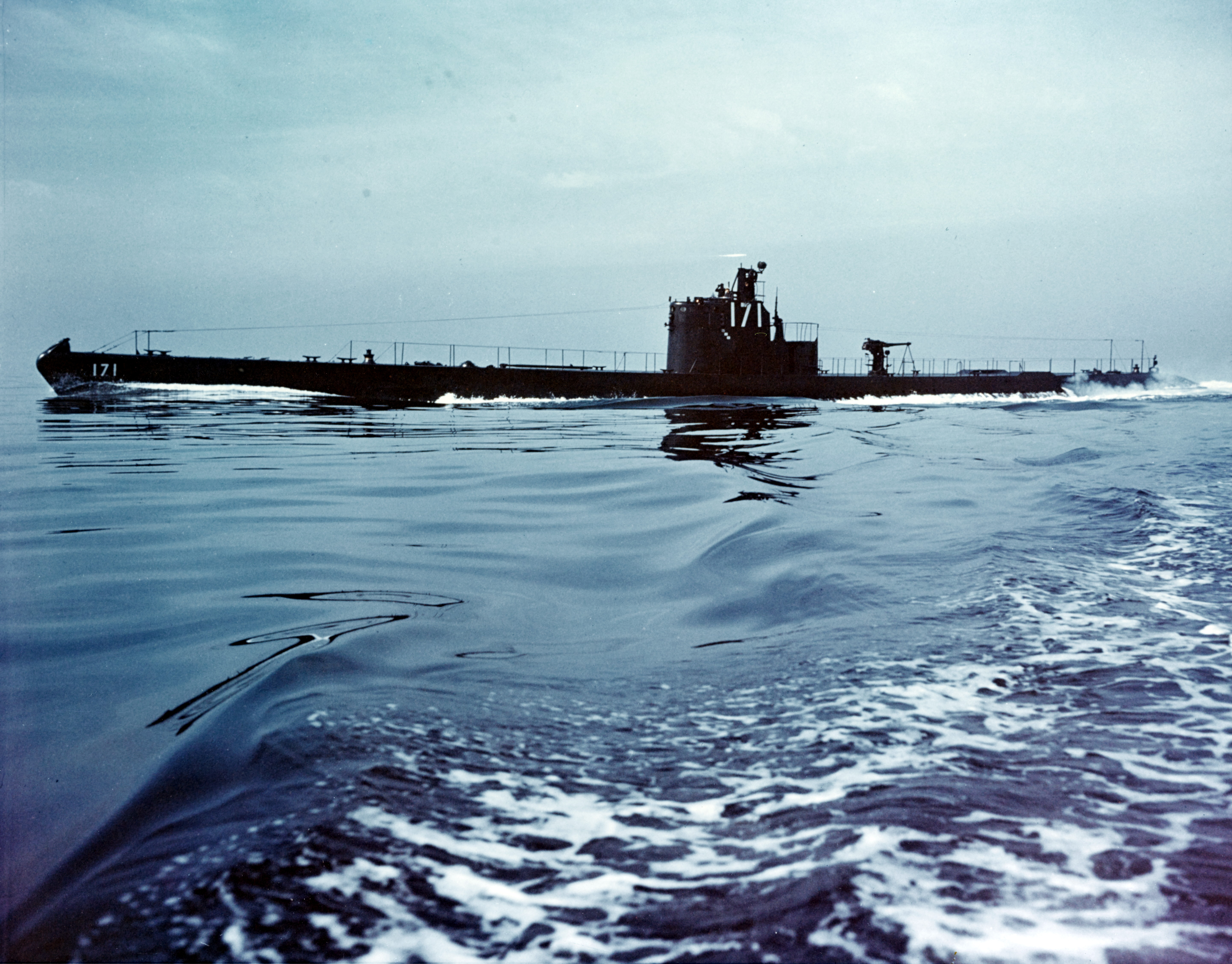

History

United States
- Name: USS Cuttlefish
- Builder: Electric Boat Company, Groton, Connecticut
- Laid down: 7 October 1931
- Launched: 21 November 1933
- Commissioned: 8 June 1934
- Decommissioned: 24 October 1945
- Stricken: 3 July 1946
- Fate: Sold for breaking up, 12 February 1947

General characteristics
- Class & type: V-9 Cachalot-class direct-drive diesel and electric submarine
- Displacement: 1,130 tons (1,150 t) surfaced, standard, 1,650 tons (1,680 t) submerged
- Length: 274 ft (83.5 m)
- Beam: 24 ft 9 in (7.54 m)
- Draft: 16 ft 3 in (4.95 m) maximum
- Propulsion: As Built: 2 × BuEng-built, MAN-designed direct drive main diesel engines, 1,535 hp (1,145 kW) each, 1 × BuEng MAN auxiliary diesel driving a 330 kW (440 hp) electric generator, 2 × Electro Dynamic electric motors, 800 hp (600 kW) each, 2 × 120-cell Exide WLLH31 batteries, 2 shafts; Re-engined 1937-38: 2 × Winton GM 16-278 diesels, 1,600 hp (1,200 kW) each,
- Speed: 17 kn (31 km/h) surfaced; 8 kn (15 km/h) submerged
- Range: 6,000 nmi (11,000 km) @ 10 kn (19 km/h), 14,000 nmi (26,000 km) @ 10 kn with fuel in main ballast tanks, 83,290 US gal (315,300 L) oil fuel
- Endurance: 10 hours at 5 knots (9 km/h)
- Test depth: 250 ft (80 m)
- Complement: 6 officers, 39 men (peacetime); 7 officers, 48 men (war)
- Armament: 6 × 21 inch (533 mm) torpedo tubes, (four forward, two aft; 16 torpedoes), 1 × 3 inch (76 mm)/50 caliber deck gun

USS Cuttlefish (SC-5/SS-171), a Cachalot-class submarine and one of the "V-boats", was the second ship of the United States Navy to be named for the cuttlefish. Her keel was laid down by Electric Boat Company in Groton, Connecticut. She was launched on 21 November 1933 sponsored by Mrs. B. S. Bullard, and commissioned on 8 June 1934, Lieutenant Commander Charles W. "Gin" Styer in command. Cuttlefish was the first submarine built entirely at Electric Boat's facility in Groton, Connecticut; construction of previous Electric Boat designs had been subcontracted to other shipyards, notably Fore River Shipbuilding of Quincy, Massachusetts. Four Peruvian R-class submarines had previously been finished in Groton, using material from cancelled S-boats salvaged from Fore River.

== Design ==
Cuttlefish differed from her sister Cachalot (built by the Portsmouth Navy Yard) mainly in her different internal arrangements and the incorporation of the first air conditioning plant in a USN submarine. Like all of the other V-boats (except V-1, 2, and 3), she was built to a partial riveted/partial welded construction. Electric Boat expanded on the use of welding pioneered by Portsmouth, with most of Cuttlefish's outer hull and fuel tanks welded, but with the internal pressure hull still riveted. This was entirely successful as it virtually eliminated the problem of fuel leakage caused by the riveted fuel tanks on earlier boats. Both were medium-sized submarines built under the tonnage limits of the London Naval Treaty of 1930. An extensive study was conducted to determine the optimum submarine size under the treaty restrictions, factoring in total force, endurance, and percentage of the force that could be maintained on station far from a base, as in a Pacific war scenario. Despite the calculation process, size reduction had gone too far with the Cachalots, limiting their patrol endurance. After three Pacific war patrols, Cuttlefish was relegated to training duties in September 1942, once numerous Gato-class boats became available.

The as-built engine specifications were two BuEng-built, MAN-designed M9Vu 40/46 nine-cylinder two-cycle direct drive main diesel engines, 1,535 hp (1,145 kW) each, with one BuEng MAN two-cycle auxiliary diesel engine, driving a 330 kW (440 hp) electric generator. The auxiliary engine was for charging batteries or for increased surface speed via a diesel-electric system providing power to the main electric motors. As with most V-boats, the main engines proved troublesome, and were replaced in 1937–38 by two Winton GM 16-278 16-cylinder four-cycle diesels, 1,600 hp (1,200 kW) each.

== Service history ==
=== Inter-War Period ===
Departing New London, Connecticut on 15 May 1935, Cuttlefish arrived at San Diego, California, on 22 June. She sailed on torpedo practice and fleet tactics exercises along the West Coast and in the Hawaiian Islands until 28 June 1937, when she sailed for the Panama Canal, Miami, Florida, New York City, and New London, Connecticut.

Arriving at New London on 28 July, she conducted experimental torpedo firing, sound training, and other operations for the Submarine School. At this time her troublesome MAN engines were replaced with Winton GM engines at the New York Navy Yard in 1937–38, as were her sister's. She sailed from New York City on 22 October 1938 for Coco Solo, where she conducted diving operations and other exercises for the training of submariners until 20 March 1939, sailing then for the Mare Island Navy Yard, California.

Cuttlefish arrived at Pearl Harbor on 16 June and was based there on patrol duty, as well as joining in battle problems and exercises in the Hawaiian area. That autumn, she cruised to the Samoan Islands, and in 1940 to the West Coast. On 5 October 1941, she cleared Pearl Harbor for an overhaul at the Mare Island Navy Yard.

=== World War II ===
After returning to Pearl Harbor, Cuttlefish put to sea on her first war patrol on 29 January 1942. On 13 February, she performed a reconnaissance of Marcus Island, gaining valuable information, and after patrolling in the Bonin Islands, returned to Midway Island on 24 March. She refitted there and at Pearl Harbor, and on 2 May cleared Midway for her second war patrol. From 18 to 24 May, she reconnoitered Saipan and the northern part of the Mariana Islands. On 19 May, she attacked a patrol ship, and while maneuvering for a second attack, was detected. She was forced deep to endure four hours of severe depth charging, more of which came her way on 24 May when she challenged three enemy destroyers. The next day an alert enemy plane caught her on the surface and dropped two bombs as she went under, both of them misses.

As it became obvious the Japanese Fleet was out in strength, Cuttlefish was ordered to patrol about 700 nautical miles (1,300 km) west of Midway, remaining on station during the Battle of Midway from 4–6 June 1942. She returned to Pearl Harbor on 15 June, and there and at Midway prepared for her third war patrol, for which she sailed on 29 July under the command of Lieutenant Commander Elliot E. Marshall. Patrolling off the Japanese homeland, she attacked a destroyer on 18 August, and received a punishing depth charge attack. Three days later, she launched a spread of torpedoes, three of which hit a freighter and one of which hit an escort. Explosions were seen, but the sinking could not be confirmed. On 5 September, she attacked a tanker which, it is believed, she sank.

Returning to Pearl Harbor on 20 September 1942, Cuttlefish was ordered to New London, where she served the Submarine School as a training ship from December 1942 to October 1945. On 8 December 1944, she suffered minor damage in a collision with USS Bray (DE-709). She was decommissioned at Philadelphia on 24 October 1945, and sold for scrap on 12 February 1947.

== Awards ==
- American Defense Service Medal with "FLEET" clasp
- American Campaign Medal
- Asiatic-Pacific Campaign Medal with two battle stars for World War II service
- World War II Victory Medal
