= Cachalot-class submarine =

Pair of US Navy submarines, 1933 to 1945

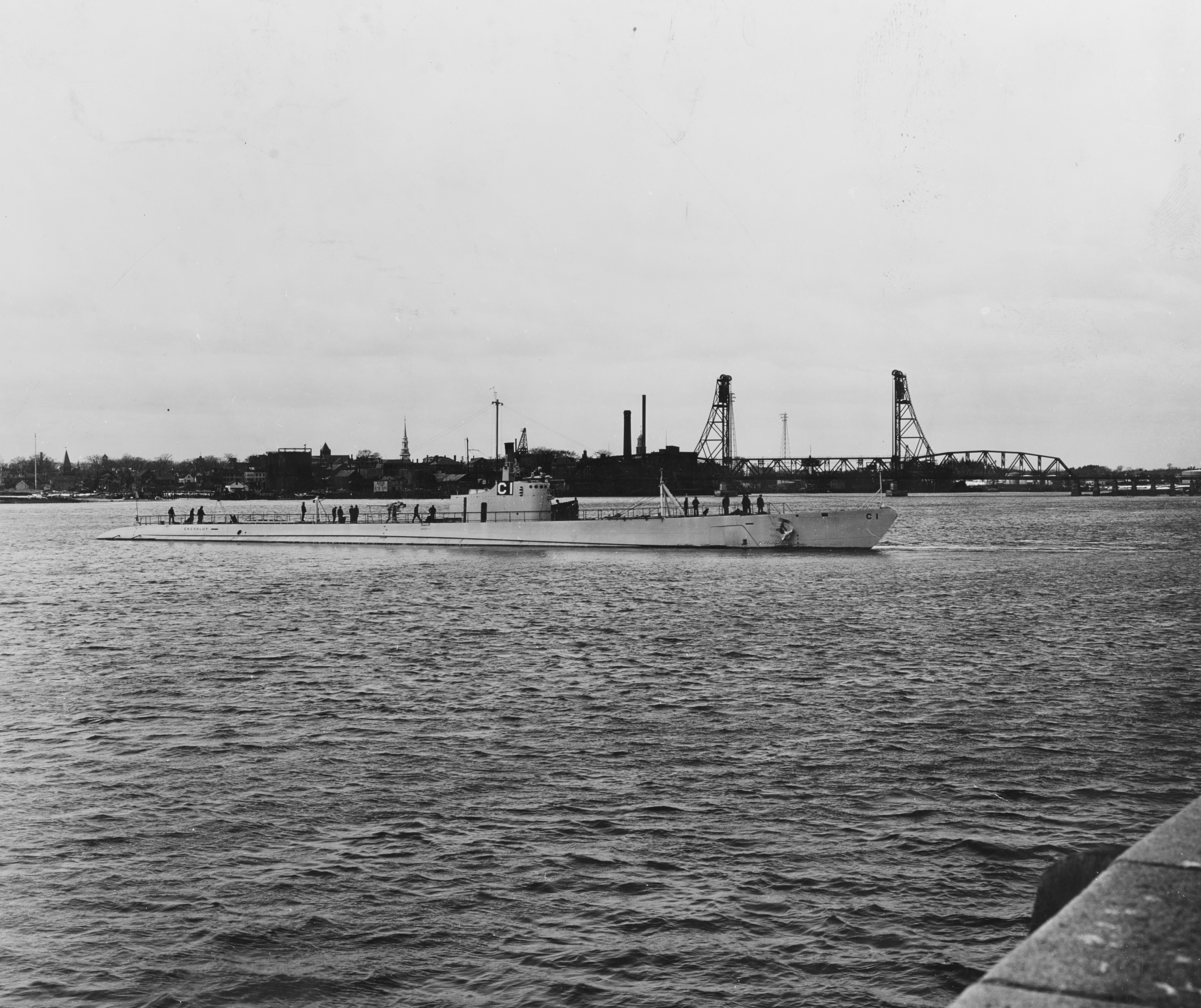
- USS Cachalot (SS-170) the lead boat of the class

Class overview
- Name: Cachalot class
- Builders: Portsmouth Naval Shipyard; Electric Boat Company
- Operators: United States Navy
- Preceded by: USS Dolphin (SS-169)
- Succeeded by: Porpoise class
- Built: 1931-1934
- In commission: 1933-1945
- Completed: 2
- Retired: 2

General characteristics
- Type: Submarine
- Displacement: 1,100 long tons (1,100 t) surfaced; 1,650 long tons (1,680 t) submerged
- Length: 260 ft (79 m) waterline, 274 ft (84 m) overall
- Beam: 24 ft 1 in (7.34 m)
- Draft: 13 ft 10 in (4.22 m)
- Propulsion: As Built: 2 × BuEng-built, MAN-designed direct drive main diesel engines, 1,535 hp (1,145 kW) each, 1 × BuEng MAN auxiliary diesel driving a 330 kW (440 hp) electrical generator; 2 × electric motors, 800 hp (600 kW) each, 2 × 120-cell Exide batteries, 2 shafts
- Speed: 17 knots (31 km/h; 20 mph) surfaced; 7 knots (13 km/h; 8.1 mph) submerged
- Range: 11,000 nautical miles (20,000 km; 13,000 mi) at 10 knots (19 km/h; 12 mph) (20,000 km at 19 km/h) surfaced; 83,290 US gallons (315,300 L) oil fuel
- Endurance: 10 hours at 5 knots (9.3 km/h) submerged
- Test depth: 250 ft (76 m)
- Complement: 6 officers, 39 men (peacetime); 7 officers, 48 men (war)
- Armament: 6 × 21 inch (533 mm) torpedo tubes (4 forward, 2 aft, 16 torpedoes); 1 × 3-inch (76 mm)/50 caliber deck gun; 2 × .30-caliber (7.62mm) machine guns

The Cachalot-class submarines were a pair of medium-sized submarines of the United States Navy built under the tonnage limits of the London Naval Treaty of 1930. They were originally named V-8 and V-9, and so were known as "V-boats" even though they were unrelated to the other seven submarines (V-1 through V-7) constructed between World War I and World War II. An extensive study was conducted to determine the optimum submarine size under the treaty restrictions, factoring in total force, endurance, and percentage of the force that could be maintained on station far from a base, as in a Pacific war scenario. Joseph W. Paige of the Navy's Bureau of Construction and Repair (BuC&R) developed the basic design, but the builder, Electric Boat, was responsible for detailed arrangement; this was fairly bold, since Electric Boat had not built any new submarines since finishing four obsolescent boats for Peru. The previous V-boats were all built in naval shipyards. Cuttlefish was the first submarine built at EB's facility in Groton, Connecticut; construction of previous Electric Boat designs had been subcontracted to other shipyards, notably Fore River Shipbuilding of Quincy, Massachusetts.

== Design ==
Although externally much like the later "fleet submarines," internally the Cachalots were quite different. Due to pressure from the Submarine Officers Conference, they featured full double hulls derived from the concept of the Kaiserliche Marine's U-135, direct-drive diesel propulsion systems, a separate crew's mess (reinstated thanks to EB's rearrangement of the internal layout; Portsmouth would follow soon after), and considerable space around the conning tower within the large bridge fairwater (which was drastically cut down in World War II when the 3-inch (76 mm) deck gun was relocated forward of the bridge). The 3-inch gun was selected because it was felt at the time that a larger gun would encourage submarine captains to fight on the surface against superior anti-submarine ships; this remained the standard submarine deck gun until early in World War II, when war experience showed that a larger gun was needed.

EB greatly expanded on the use of electric welding that had been pioneered by Portsmouth on the earlier V-boats. On Cuttlefish, most of the outer hull and the fuel tanks were welded, while the inner pressure hull remained riveted. Portsmouth, while welding non-critical areas on Cachalot like the superstructure, piping brackets, support framing and interior tanks, continued to use riveting for both the inner and outer hulls. During the war, the riveted boats would leak fuel oil.

The as-built engine specifications were two BuEng-built, MAN-designed M9Vu 40/46 nine-cylinder two-cycle direct drive main diesel engines, 1,535 hp (1,145 kW) each, with one BuEng MAN two-cycle auxiliary diesel engine, driving a 330 kW (440 hp) electrical generator. The auxiliary engine was for charging batteries or for increased surface speed via a diesel-electric system providing power to the main electric motors.

Due to the full double hull design, the external tanks proved too narrow for easy maintenance, and the MAN diesels were a constant headache, demanding re-engining with General Motors-Winton four-cycle 16-258 engines in 1936-38. On the other hand, the class made a major contribution to habitability, when Cuttlefish was the first sub fitted with air conditioning, and to effectiveness, being first fitted with the Mark I Torpedo Data Computer (TDC).

== Service ==
Despite the calculation process, size reduction had gone too far with the Cachalots, limiting their patrol endurance. The subsequent Porpoise class were about 300 tons larger, and each succeeding class was incrementally larger than its predecessors through the Gato-class submarines of 1941 (with exception of the two experimental Mackerel-class submarines of 1939). After three Pacific war patrols each, the Cachalots were relegated to training duties in September 1942, as numerous Gato-class boats became available.

== Boats in class ==
Construction data
Name	Hull no.	Builder	Laid down	Launched	Commissioned	Decommissioned	Fate
Cachalot	SS-170	Portsmouth Navy Yard	21 October 1931	19 October 1933	1 December 1933	17 October 1945	Scrapped 1947
Cuttlefish	SS-171	Electric Boat Company	7 October 1931	21 November 1933	8 June 1934	24 October 1945	Scrapped 1947

== See also ==
- List of submarine classes of the United States Navy
- List of ship classes of the Second World War
