= Ukiangong Point =

Coordinates: 3°2′22″N 172°45′30″E

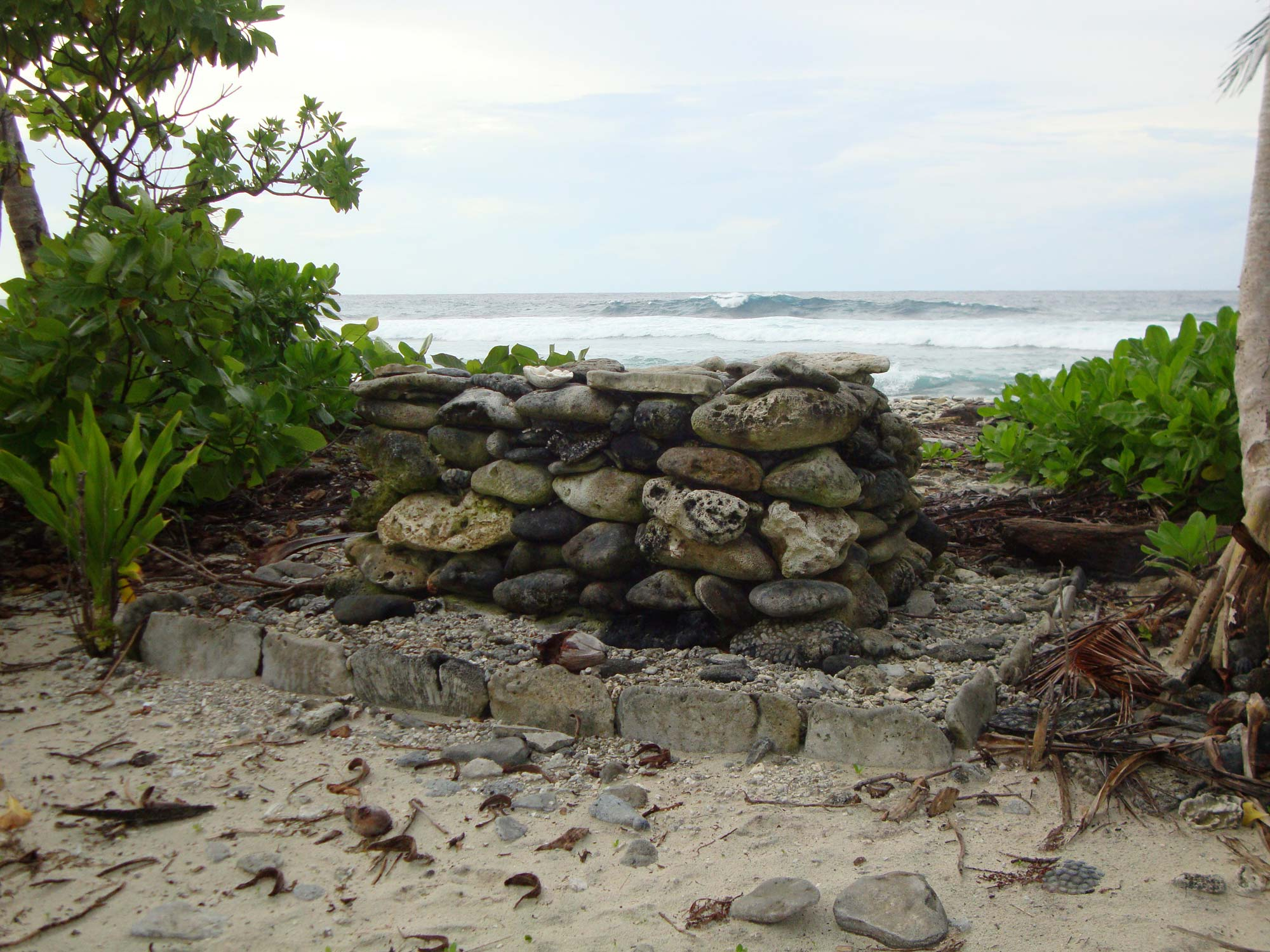
Current war memorial at the end of the road to Ukiangang

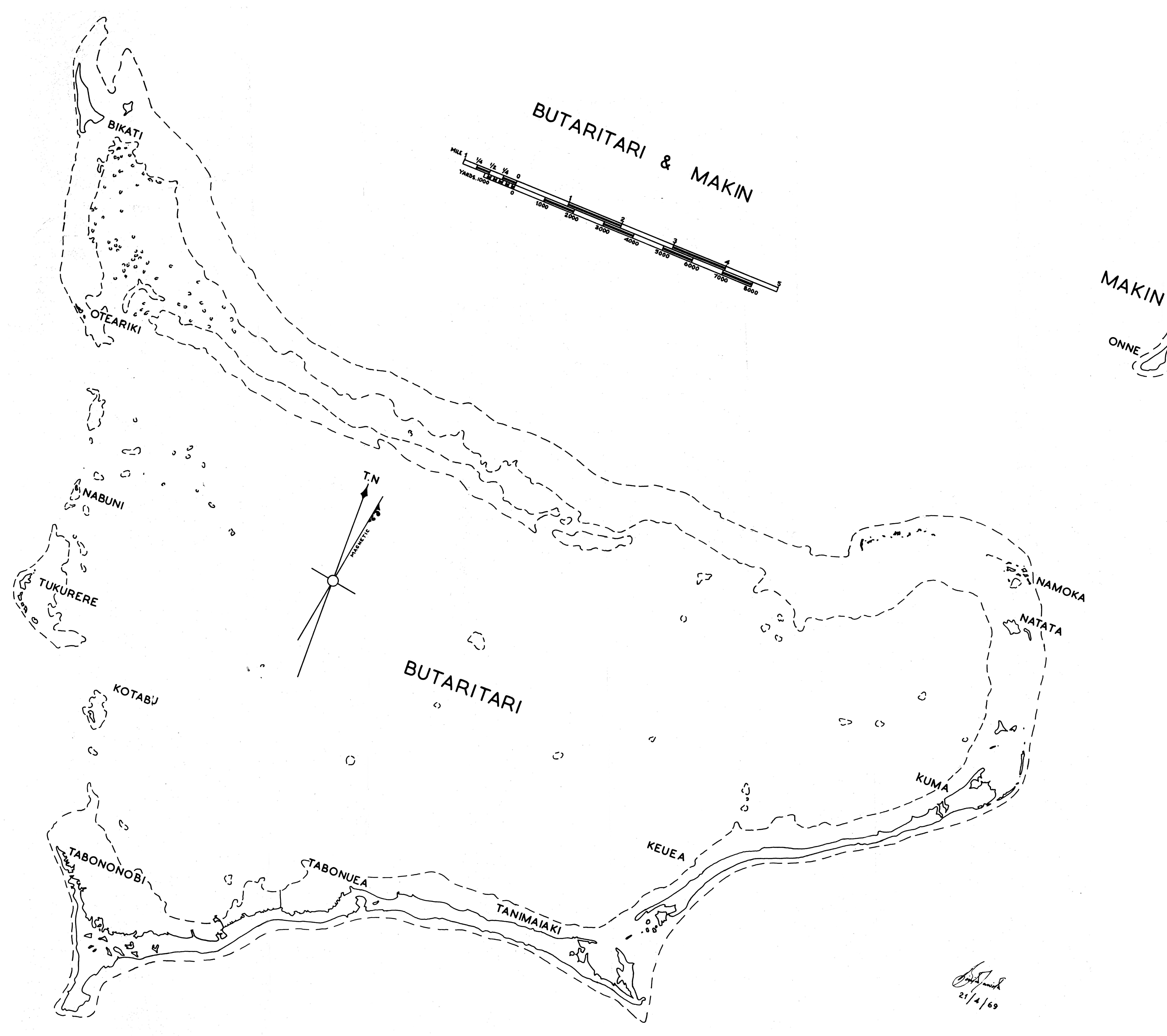
Butaritari Atoll

Ukiangong Point is the southwesternmost point on Butaritari atoll located in the Pacific Ocean island nation of Kiribati. It is located on the islet of Tabonohobi.

== World War II ==
Ukiangong Point was fired upon by the USS Nautilus shortly after 7 AM on August 17, 1942, after the submarine and the USS Argonaut had dropped Lieutenant Colonel Evans F. Carlson's Marine Raiders on the ocean side of Butaritari Island as part of the Makin Raid. Later in the war, the capture of Ukiangong point was an early objective in the U.S. Army's assault on Butaritari on November 20, 1943.
