= USS Pickerel (SS-177) =

Submarine of the United States

Coordinates: 41°3′N 141°58′E

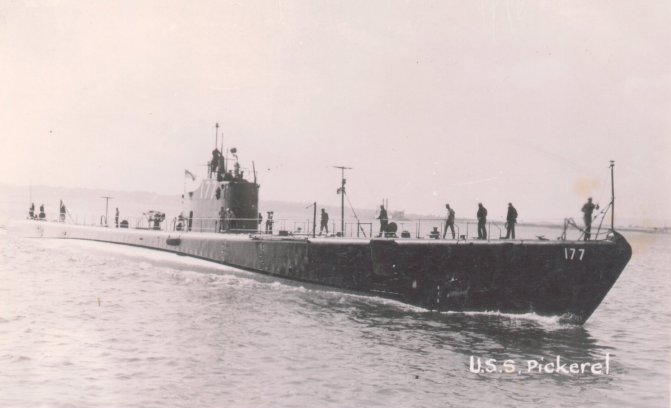
- USS Pickerel (SS-177)

History

United States
- Builder: General Dynamics Electric Boat, Groton, Connecticut
- Laid down: 25 March 1935
- Launched: 7 July 1936
- Commissioned: 26 January 1937
- Stricken: 19 August 1943
- Fate: Sunk by Japanese forces north of Honshū on 3 April 1943

General characteristics
- Class & type: Porpoise-class diesel-electric submarine
- Displacement: 1,350 tons (1,372 t) standard, surfaced, 1,997 tons (2,029 t) submerged
- Length: 298 ft (91 m) (waterline), 300 ft 6 in (91.59 m) (overall)
- Beam: 25 ft 7/8 in (7.6 m)
- Draft: 15 ft (4.6 m)
- Propulsion: 4 × Winton Model 16-201A 16-cylinder two-cycle diesel engines, 1,300 hp (0.97 MW) each, driving electrical generators through reduction gears, 2 × 120-cell Gould AMTX33HB batteries, 8 × General Electric electric motors, 538 hp (401 kW) each, 2 × General Motors six-cylinder four-cycle 6-241 auxiliary diesels
- Speed: 19.25 kn (35.65 km/h) surfaced, 8.75 kn (16.21 km/h) submerged
- Range: 11,000 nmi (20,000 km) @ 10 kn (19 km/h), (bunkerage 92,801 US gallons (351,290 L)
- Endurance: 10 hours @ 5 kn (9.3 km/h), 36 hours @ minimum speed submerged
- Test depth: 250 ft (76 m)
- Complement: 5 officers, 45 enlisted
- Armament: 6 × 21 inch (533 mm) torpedo tubes (four forward, two aft; 16 torpedoes) (two external bow tubes added 1942), 1 × 4 in (100 mm)/50 cal deck gun, 4 × 0.3 cal (7.62 mm) machine guns (2x2)

USS Pickerel (SS-177), a Porpoise-class submarine, was the first ship of the United States Navy to be named for the pickerel, species of freshwater fish native to the eastern United States and Canada.

Her keel was laid on 25 March 1935 by the Electric Boat Company in Groton, Connecticut. She was launched on 7 July 1936 sponsored by Miss Evelyn Standley, daughter of Rear Admiral William Standley, acting Secretary of the Navy. She was commissioned on 26 January 1937, Lieutenant Leon J. Huffman in command.

== Service history ==
=== Inter-War Period ===
After her shakedown cruise, the new boat conducted training exercises out of New London, Connecticut until getting underway on 26 October 1937 and heading, via Guantánamo Bay, Cuba to transit the Panama Canal on 9 November. Joining the Pacific Fleet, Pickerel operated out of San Diego, California, along the West Coast, and in Hawaiian waters. Subsequently, transferred to the Asiatic Fleet, she prepared for war with a vigorous training schedule in the Philippines.

=== World War II ===
Upon receiving word of Japan's attack on Pearl Harbor, Pickerel – commanded by Lieutenant Commander Barton E. Bacon, Jr. – sped to the coast of French Indochina and conducted her first war patrol off Cam Ranh Bay and Tourane Harbor. She tracked a Japanese submarine and a destroyer but lost them in haze and rain squalls before they came in torpedo range. On 19 December, she also missed a small Japanese patrol craft with five torpedoes, before returning to Manila Bay on 29 December.

On her second patrol (31 December 1941 – 29 January 1942), conducted between Manila and Surabaya, the submarine sank Kanko Maru on 10 January 1942. On her third war patrol (7 February–19 March), along the Malay Barrier, and her fourth (15 April–6 June), in the Philippines, she failed to score.

Pickerel's fifth war patrol (10 July–26 August), was a voyage from Brisbane, Australia, to Pearl Harbor for refit, with a short patrol in the Mariana Islands en route, during which she damaged a freighter. During the refit, LCDR Bacon was detached and Pickerel's executive officer, Lieutenant Commander Augustus H. Alston, Jr., became her new CO.

On her sixth war patrol (22 January–3 March 1943), she searched among the Kurile Islands on the Tokyo-Kiska traffic lanes. In sixteen attacks, she sank Tateyama Maru and two 35-ton sampans.

She departed Pearl Harbor on 18 March 1943 and, after topping off with fuel and provisions at Midway Island on 22 March, headed for the eastern coast of northern Honshū, Japan and was never heard from again. Pickerel was the first submarine to be lost in the Central Pacific area. She was stricken from the Naval Vessel Register on 19 August 1943.

Post-war analysis of Japanese records give conflicting suggestions about Pickerel's fate. The Japanese officially credit her with sinking Submarine Chaser Number 13 on 3 April and Fukuei Maru on 7 April, and give no official report of her destruction. Those records also describe an action off Shiramuka Lighthouse on northern Honshū on 3 April 1943 in which naval aircraft first bombed an unidentified submarine, then directed Shiragami and Bunzan Maru to the spot, where they dropped twenty-six depth charges. A large quantity of oil floated to the surface, which was often enough for Japanese ASW ships to believe their target was sunk. It is likely Pickerel's fuel oil bunkers leaked. Since there were several other ASW operations in the area in that period, and Pickerel was the only American submarine in that area, one of these other attacks, sometime after 7 April, probably claimed her.

== Awards ==
- Asiatic-Pacific Campaign Medal with three battle stars for World War II service

== Sources ==
- Beach Jr., Edward L. "Ned". Submarine!. Henry Holt, 1952.
- Beach Jr., Edward L. Run Silent, Run Deep (a novel). Pocket Books, 1972.
- _____. Dust on the Sea (a novel). Dell, 1972.
- Grider, George W., as told to Lydel Sims. War Fish. Little, Brown and Company, 1958.
- Holmes, Wilfred J. "Jasper" Undersea Victory. Doubleday, 1966.
- O'Kane, Richard H. Clear the Bridge!. Rand McNally & Co., 1977.
- ______. Wahoo: The Patrols of America's Most Famous World War II. Presidio Pres, 1987.
