= USS Pollack (SS-180) =

Submarine of the United States

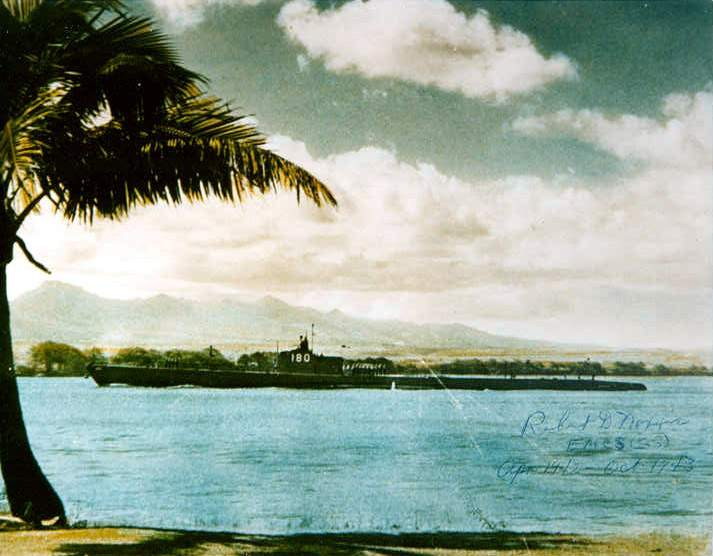
- Pollack (SS-180) entering Pearl Harbor, c. 1943-44

History

United States
- Name: Pollack
- Builder: Portsmouth Naval Shipyard, Kittery, Maine
- Laid down: 1 October 1935
- Launched: 15 September 1936
- Commissioned: 15 January 1937
- Decommissioned: 21 September 1945
- Stricken: 11 October 1945, then reinstated 28 November 1945, and struck again 29 October 1946
- Fate: Sold for breaking up, 2 February 1947

General characteristics
- Class & type: Porpoise-class diesel-electric submarine
- Displacement: 1,350 tons (1,372 t) standard, surfaced; 1,997 tons (2,029 t) submerged
- Length: 298 ft 0 in (90.83 m) (waterline), 300 ft 6 in (91.59 m) (overall)
- Beam: 25 ft 7/8 in (7.6 m)
- Draft: 13 ft 9 in (4.19 m)
- Propulsion: (as built) 4 × Fairbanks-Morse Model 38A8 8-cylinder opposed piston diesel engines, 1,300 hp (970 kW) each, driving electrical generators; 3 × Fairbanks-Morse Model 6-38A5 opposed piston auxiliary diesels; (re-engined) 4 × Fairbanks-Morse Model 38D8 1/8 opposed piston diesels, 1,365 hp (1,018 kW) each; one Fairbanks-Morse Model 7-38A5 1/4 opposed piston auxiliary diesel; 2 × 120-cell Gould AMTX33HB batteries; 4 × high-speed Elliott electric motors with 4.84:1 reduction gears, 1,090 hp (810 kW) each; two shafts
- Speed: 19.25 knots (36 km/h) surfaced; 8.75 knots (16 km/h) submerged
- Range: 11,000 nautical miles (20,000 km) at 10 knots (19 km/h); (bunkerage 92,801 US gallons (351,290 L)
- Endurance: 10 hours at 5 knots (9.3 km/h), 36 hours at minimum speed submerged
- Test depth: 250 ft (76 m)
- Complement: (as built) 5 officers, 45 enlisted; (1945) 8 officers, 65 enlisted
- Armament: 6 × 21 inch (533 mm) (533 mm) torpedo tubes (four forward, two aft, 16 torpedoes); 1 × 4 in (100 mm)/50;caliber deck gun; 4 × .30 cal (7.62 mm) machineguns (2x2)
- Notes: 10 Battle stars

USS Pollack (SS-180), a Porpoise-class submarine, was the first ship of the United States Navy to be named for the pollack, a food fish resembling the true cod, but with the lower jaw projecting and without the barbel.

== Construction and commissioning ==
The first Pollack was laid down 1 October 1935 by the Portsmouth Navy Yard, in Kittery, Maine; launched 15 September 1936; sponsored by Miss Anne Carter Lauman; and commissioned 15 January 1937.

== Service history ==
=== 1937–1941 ===
Pollack stood out of Portsmouth Navy Yard 7 June 1937 for a Caribbean shakedown cruise. She returned from this cruise to Portsmouth 4 September and was underway 29 November for the West Coast of the United States. She reached her new base at San Diego, California, 19 December and spent the next 11 months in a rigorous schedule of maneuvers along the western seaboard with Submarine Division 13, Scouting Force. Pollack shifted to Pearl Harbor 28 October 1939. Except for periods of overhaul at Mare Island Navy Yard, she remained in Hawaiian waters until the outbreak of World War II. She was underway from San Francisco to Hawaii when the Japanese attacked on 7 December, and she entered Pearl Harbor two days later.

=== 1942 ===
Pollack (commanded by Stanley P. Moseley, Class of 1925), Gudgeon and Plunger departed Pearl Harbor on 13 December and were off the coast of Honshū, Japan, a few hours before midnight on 31 December, the first American warships to reach Japanese waters in World War II. Pollack damaged the 2,700-ton cargo ship Heijo Maru on 5 January 1942 and two days later sent the 2,250-ton cargo ship Unkai Maru No. 1 to the bottom, the first officially confirmed victim of the Pacific Fleet Submarine Force. On 9 January she sank the 5,387-ton freighter Teian Maru by a night surface attack, and ended her first war patrol at Pearl Harbor on 21 January.

Pollack got underway from Pearl Harbor on 18 February to intercept enemy cargo ships carrying war material to Nagasaki by way of the Formosa Channel. On 11 March she torpedoed and sank the 1,454-ton cargo ship Fukushu Maru. After midnight on 11 March she sank two sampans with gunfire;. She sank a second cargo ship, the 5,266-ton Baikal Maru with gunfire before returning to Pearl Harbor on 8 April.

Pollack departed Pearl Harbor on 2 May and was in waters of the Japanese home islands on 12 May when she battle-surfaced to riddle a 600-ton patrol vessel with 4 in (102 mm) and .50 cal (12.7 mm) fire. This target settled by the stern and burned furiously at every point above the waterline. Pollack returned from her third war patrol to Pearl Harbor on 16 June.

Following four months of overhaul at Pearl Harbor, Pollack put to sea for her fourth war patrol on 10 October. Before she reached her assigned area she was ordered back to Midway, arriving on 23 October. She fueled to capacity and stood out of the Midway channel that same day to patrol the approaches to Truk in an attempt to intercept crippled enemy ships believed en route to that enemy stronghold from sea battles in the Solomon Islands. There were no contacts with enemy shipping during the entire patrol and Pollack returned to Pearl Harbor on 29 November.

=== 1943 ===
Pollack's fifth war patrol was again spent in waters off the Japanese home islands. After departing Pearl Harbor on 31 December, she sighted only one target on 21 January 1943 which fired three shells at the submarine; Pollack fired four torpedoes at a range of 2,400 yards (2,200 m)-results were "undetermined" before terminating her fifth war patrol at Pearl Harbor on 10 February 1943.

Pollack spent her sixth war patrol between the Gilbert and Marshall Islands. She put to sea from Pearl Harbor 6 March and intercepted a freighter in the sealane between Jaluit and Makin Atolls on the afternoon of 20 March, damaging her with one of three torpedoes. Pollack ended her sixth war patrol at Midway on 18 April.

Underway for her seventh war patrol, Pollack departed Midway on 10 May to reconnoiter Ailuk Atoll and Wotje Atoll, then patrolled to the south and west towards Schischmarev Strait. On 18 May she torpedoed and sank the 3,110-ton ex-gunboat Terushima Maru. Off Jaluit Atoll the next afternoon, she torpedoed and sank the 5,350-ton converted light cruiser Bangkok Maru, which was carrying 1,200 Japanese troops intending to reinforce the garrison at Tarawa. Pollack received a depth charge attack and was lightly damaged. The timing of this attack was important in reducing the number of Japanese troops garrisoned on Tarawa, which was attacked by American forces several months later in the Battle of Tarawa. Pollack returned to Pearl Harbor on 25 June.

Sailing on 20 July, Pollack spent her eighth war patrol off the east coast of Kyūshū, Japan. On 6 August she scored a torpedo hit on one ship in a convoy. Early on 27 August 1943, Pollack picked out one of five merchant ships off the coast of Kyūshū and pressed home an attack which sank the 3,520-ton passenger/cargo ship Taifuku Maru. On 3 September she sank the 3,521-ton cargo ship Tagonoura Maru. She returned to Pearl Harbor on 16 September.

=== 1944 ===
Pollack got underway from Pearl Harbor on 28 February 1944 and battled heavy seas as she entered the assigned area of her ninth war patrol off Nanpō Islands 18 March. Two days later she made a night surface attack and watched two torpedo hits blow the 1,327-ton patrol boat Hakuyo Maru to pieces. On 25 March she sank the 300-ton No. 13-class Submarine Chaser No. 54, and damaged two freighters. On 3 April she sank passenger-cargo ship Tosei Maru. She returned to Midway on 11 April.

Pollack's tenth war patrol was conducted off the Nanpō Islands. She cleared Midway on 6 May and was sixteen days out to sea when she moved in on about ten merchant ships with several escorts. She scored torpedo hits which sank the 1,270-ton Japanese destroyer Asanagi but was held down by a fierce counter-attack while the remaining ships of the convoy escaped. She returned to Pearl Harbor on 7 June.

Pollack departed Pearl Harbor for her eleventh war patrol on 15 July. She touched at Majuro, Marshall Islands, and then steamed on lifeguard station in support of the air strikes made on Woleai island on 1 August. She was off Yap Island from 4–5 August for similar duty, then patrolled in the Yap-Palau area, taking time out to shell the phosphate plant on Fais Island on 27 August and 30 August. On 27 August, a United States Army Air Forces B-24 Liberator bomber strafed her with machine-gun fire in the Pacific Ocean off Yap in the Caroline Islands in the vicinity of 09°47′30″N 138°38′18″E, but Pollack suffered no damage or casualties. She returned to Brisbane, Australia, on 12 September 1944.

Pollack underwent a refit period at Brisbane, then got underway on 6 October for exercises with HMAS Geelong until 10 October. She then steamed by way of Mios Woendi, Schouten Islands, to Pearl Harbor where she arrived on 18 November for training operations off Oahu with units of the Pacific Fleet destroyer force.

=== 1945 ===
She was underway from Oahu 25 January 1945, in company with USS Permit to the East Coast of the United States, reaching the Sub Base at New London, Connecticut, 24 February. The remainder of her career was spent as a training ship for men of the Submarine School at that base. She entered the Portsmouth Navy Yard on 14 June for inactivation and was decommissioned there on 21 September 1945. Her name was stricken from the Naval Vessel Register on 29 October 1946 and she was sold for scrapping on 2 February 1947 to Ship-Shape, Inc. of Philadelphia.

== Honors and awards ==
- Asiatic-Pacific Campaign Medal with 10 battle stars for World War II service
