= Japanese destroyer Yamakaze (1936) =

Destroyer of the Imperial Japanese Navy

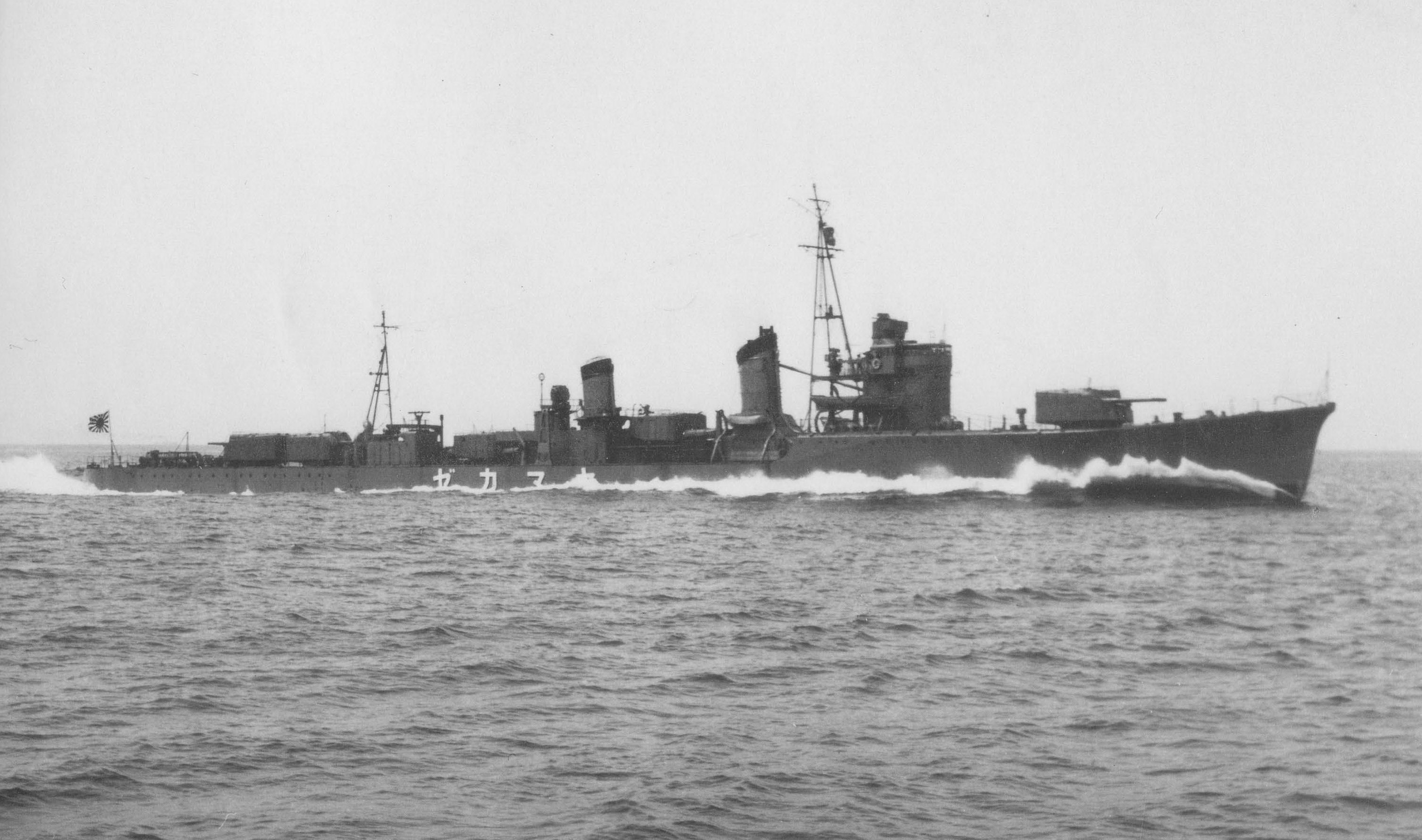
- Yamakaze underway

History

Empire of Japan
- Name: Yamakaze
- Ordered: 1934 FY
- Builder: Uraga Dock Company
- Laid down: 25 May 1935
- Launched: 21 February 1936
- Commissioned: 30 June 1937
- Stricken: 20 August 1942
- Fate: Sunk, 25 June 1942

General characteristics
- Class & type: Shiratsuyu-class destroyer
- Displacement: 1,685 long tons (1,712 t)
- Length: 103.5 m (340 ft) pp; 107.5 m (352 ft 8 in) waterline
- Beam: 9.9 m (32 ft 6 in)
- Draft: 3.5 m (11 ft 6 in)
- Propulsion: 2 shaft Kampon geared turbines; 3 boilers, 42,000 hp (31,000 kW)
- Speed: 34 knots (39 mph; 63 km/h)
- Range: 4,000 nmi (7,400 km) at 18 kn (33 km/h)
- Complement: 226
- Armament: 5 × 12.7 cm/50 Type 3 naval guns (2×2, 1×1); 2 × 13.2 mm (0.52 in) AA guns; 8 × 24 in (610 mm) torpedo tubes; 16 × Depth charges

Service record
- Operations: Battle of Tarakan (1942); Battle of the Java Sea (1942); Battle of Midway (1942)

Yamakaze (山風, ”Mountain Wind”) was the eighth of ten Shiratsuyu-class destroyers, and the second to be built for the Imperial Japanese Navy under the Circle Two Program (Maru Ni Keikaku).

== History ==
The Shiratsuyu-class destroyers were modified versions of the Hatsuharu class, and were designed to accompany the Japanese main striking force and to conduct both day and night torpedo attacks against the United States Navy as it advanced across the Pacific Ocean, according to Japanese naval strategic projections. Despite being one of the most powerful classes of destroyers in the world at the time of their completion, none survived the Pacific War.

Yamakaze, built at the Uraga Dock Company, was laid down on 25 May 1935, launched on 21 February 1936 and commissioned on 30 June 1937.

== Operational history ==
At the time of the attack on Pearl Harbor, Yamakaze was assigned to Destroyer Division 24 of Destroyer Squadron 4 of the IJN 2nd Fleet together with her sister ships Umikaze, Kawakaze, and Suzukaze, and had sortied from Palau as part of the Philippine invasion force, covering landings at Legaspi and Lamon Bay. From January 1942, Yamakaze participated in operations in the Netherlands East Indies, including the invasion of Tarakan Island, where she assisted in sinking the Royal Dutch Navy minelayer HNLMS Prins van Oranje. She later covered landings at Balikpapan and Makassar, sinking the submarine USS Shark in the Makassar Strait with her guns on 11 February. After participating in the invasion of eastern Java, Yamakaze engaged a group of Allied destroyers during the Battle of the Java Sea, and was credited with assisting in the sinking of the American destroyer USS Pope, the British cruiser HMS Exeter and destroyer HMS Encounter.

In April, Yamakaze assisted in the invasion of Panay and Negros islands in the Philippines. From 10 May, Yamakaze was reassigned to the IJN 1st Fleet and returned to Sasebo Naval Arsenal for repairs at the end of the month.

During the Battle of Midway on 4–6 June, Yamakaze was part of the Aleutians Guard Force under Admiral Shirō Takasu.

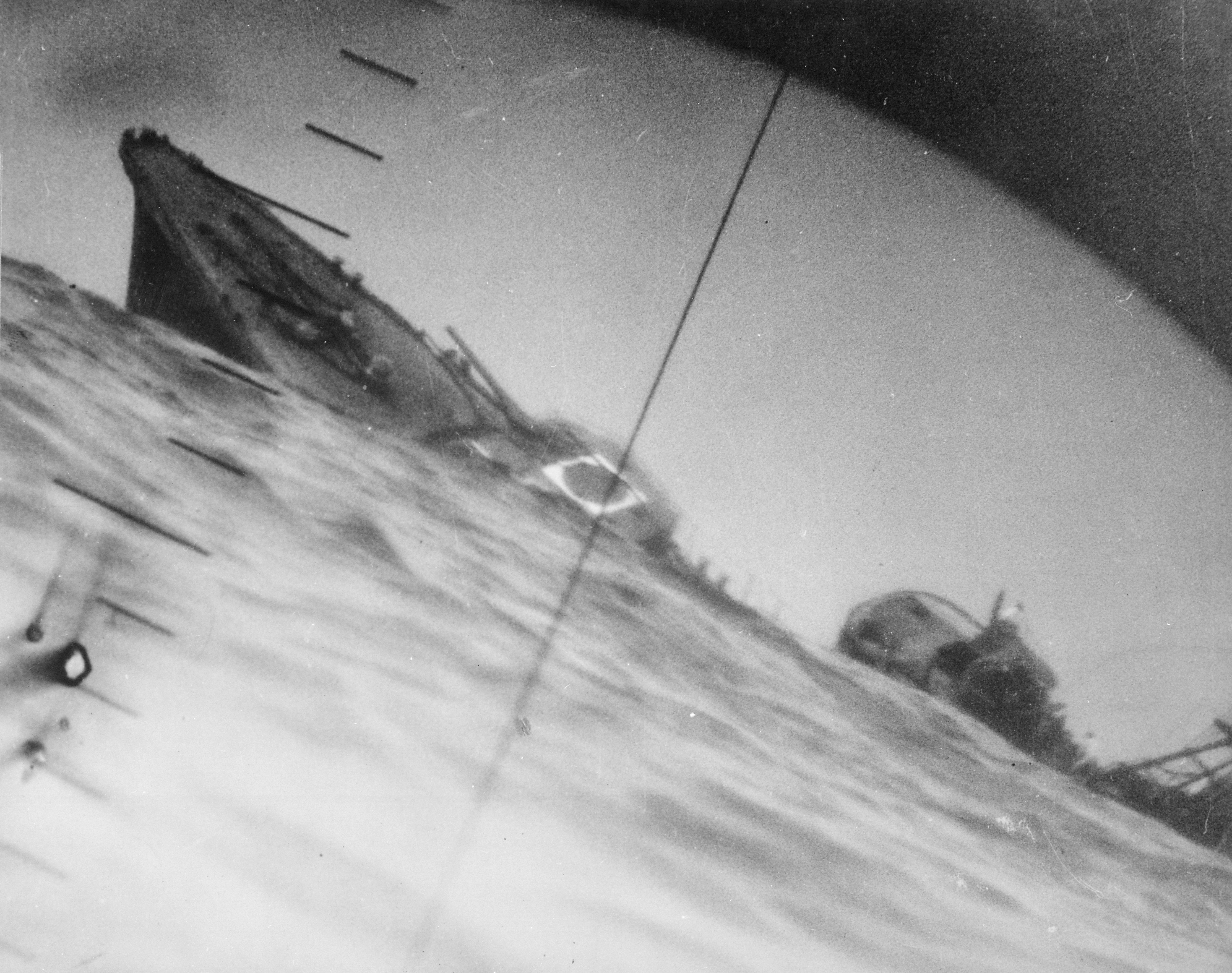
Photo of Yamakaze sinking after being torpedoed, as seen through the periscope of USS Nautilus.

On 25 June 1942, while steaming independently from Ōminato towards the Inland Sea, Yamakaze was torpedoed and sunk with all hands lost by the submarine USS Nautilus approximately 60 nautical miles (110 km) southeast of Yokosuka at position 34°34′N 140°26′E.
