= German trawler V 305 Ostpreussen =

German fishing trawler

History
- Name: Ostpreussen (1935–57); Stella Maris (1957–58)
- Namesake: Ostpreussen; Our Lady, Star of the Sea
- Owner: Nordsee Deutsche Hochseefischerei Bremen-Cuxhaven AG (1935–39); Kriegsmarine (1939–45); Nordsee Deutsche Hochseefischerei Bremen-Cuxhaven AG (1945–57); F Hansen (1957); Unknown (1957–58)
- Port of registry: (Nazi Germany) Wesermünde, Germany (1935–39); Kriegsmarine (1939–45); Wesermünde, Allied-occupied Germany (1945–49); Wesermünde, West Germany (1949–57); Emden, West Germany (1957); Netherlands (1957–58)
- Builder: Deschimag
- Yard number: 526
- Launched: June 1935
- Completed: 15 July 1935
- Commissioned: 30 September 1939
- Out of service: 1958
- Identification: Code Letters DFCN (1935–57); Fishing boat registration PG 486 (1935–39, 1945–48); Pennant Number V 305 (1939–44); Pennant Number Vs 518 (1944–45; Fishing boat registration BX 345 (1948–57)
- Fate: Scrapped

General characteristics
- Type: Fishing trawler (1935–39, 1945–57); Vorpostenboot (1939–44); Vorpostensicherungsboot (1944–45); Cargo ship (1957–58)
- Tonnage: 422 GRT, 160 NRT
- Length: 55.20 m (181 ft 1 in)
- Beam: 8.00 m (26 ft 3 in)
- Draught: 4.15 m (13 ft 7 in)
- Depth: 4.65 m (15 ft 3 in)
- Installed power: Triple expansion steam engine, 93nhp (1935–58); Diesel engine (1958–72)
- Propulsion: Single screw propeller
- Speed: 12 knots (22 km/h)

V 305 Ostpreussen was a German fishing trawler that was requisitioned in the Second World War by the Kriegsmarine for use as a vorpostenboot and later a Vorpostensicherungsboot. She was returned to her owners post war. In 1957, she was re-engined, converted to a cargo ship and renamed Stella Maris. Sold to the Netherlands that year, she was scrapped in 1958.

== Description ==
The ship was 55.20 metres (181 ft 1 in) long, with a beam of 8.00 metres (26 ft 3 in). She had a depth of 4.65 metres (15 ft 3 in) and a draught of 4.15 metres (13 ft 7 in). She was assessed at 372 GRT, 140 NRT. She was powered by a triple expansion steam engine, which had cylinders of 35 centimetres (13 3/4 in), 55 centimetres (21 5/8 in) and 90.0 centimetres (35 7/16 in) diameter by 64.9 centimetres (25 9/16 in) stroke. The engine was built by Deschimag Seebeckwerft, Wesermünde, Germany. It was rated at 93nhp. It drove a single screw propeller, and could propel the ship at 11 knots (20 km/h).

== History ==
Ostpreussen was built at yard number 526 by Deschimag Seebeckwerft, Wesermünde for the Nordsee Deutsche Hochseefischerei AG, Cuxhaven. She was launched in June 1935 and completed on 15 July. The fishing boat registration PG 487 was allocated, as were the Code Letters DFCB.

On 30 September 1939, Ostpreussen was requisitioned by the Kriegsmarine for use as a vorpostenboot. She was allocated to 3 Vorpostenflotille as V 305 Ostpreussen. On 17 November 1942, she went to the assistance of the cargo ship Hindenburg, which had struck a mine in the Baltic Sea off Utö, Finland. Hindenburg was taken in tow, but consequently sank on 19 November. On 15 February 1944, she was redesignated as a Vorpostensicherungsboot serving with 5 Vorpostensicherungsflotille as Vs 518 Ostpreussen.

Ostpreussen was returned to her owners post-war. In 1948, her registration was changed to BX 345. In January 1957, she was sold to F. Hansen, Emden, West Germany and renamed Stella Maris. In that year, a diesel engine was fitted and she was converted to a cargo ship. In March 1957, she was sold to Dutch owners. She was scrapped in the Netherlands in May 1958.

== Sources ==
- Gröner, Erich (1993). Die deutschen Kriegsschiffe 1815-1945 (in German). Vol. 8/I: Flußfahrzeuge, Ujäger, Vorpostenboote, Hilfsminensucher, Küstenschutzverbände (Teil 1). Koblenz: Bernard & Graefe. ISBN 3-7637-4807-5.
- Jordan, Roger (1999). The World's Merchant Fleets, 1939. London: Chatham Publishing. ISBN 1-86176-023-X.
