= SS Trusty =

S.S. Trusty was a steamship built by Turner Boat Works on Coal Harbour in Vancouver. She was used to deliver supplies of food and equipment, along with staff and workers to a “relief camp” built at Wilson's Landing. Also delivered mail and carried out sport fishing charters.

Launched in the spring of 1935, she remained in mail service before being moved to Victoria, British Columbia, in 1937. In 1950, the owner sold Trusty and used the money to buy a car.

One night, Trusty was accidentally backed for about 10 ft into a sheet of skim ice in Kelowna breakwater. This cut most of the way through her transom on the waterline and the plank had to be replaced the next day.

== Specifications ==
Trusty was 20 feet long with a 7 ft beam and 2 ft 6 in draft. She could travel at 9 knots with a 10 HP, 2-cylinder engine.
