= USS Shark (SS-174) =

Submarine of the United States

Coordinates: 1°45′N 127°15′E

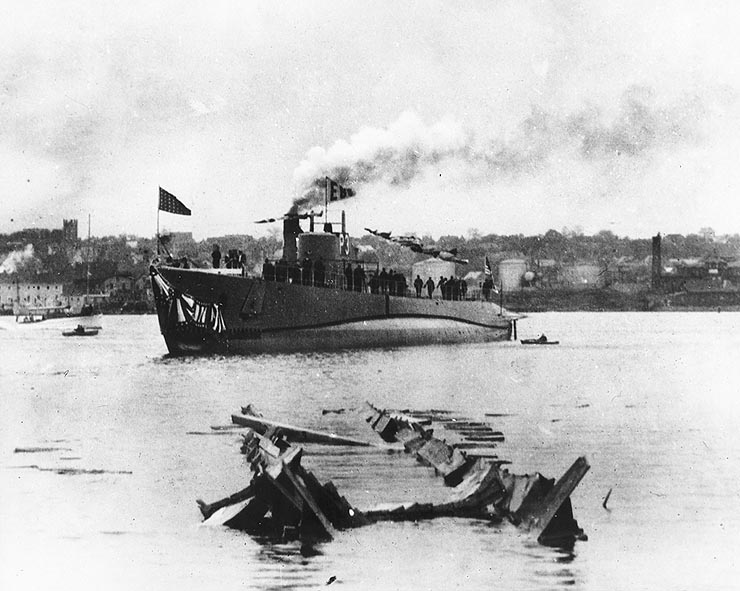
- Shark, just after launch

History

United States
- Name: USS Shark
- Builder: Electric Boat Company, Groton, Connecticut
- Laid down: 24 October 1933
- Launched: 21 May 1935
- Commissioned: 25 January 1936
- Fate: Probably sunk by Japanese destroyer Yamakaze east of Manado, 11 February 1942

General characteristics
- Class & type: Porpoise-class diesel-electric submarine
- Displacement: 1,316 long tons (1,337 t) standard, surfaced; 1,968 long tons (2,000 t) submerged
- Length: 287 ft (87 m) (waterline), 298 ft (91 m) (overall)
- Beam: 25 ft .75 in (7.6391 m)
- Draft: 13 ft 9 in (4.19 m)
- Installed power: 4,300 shp (3,200 kW) surfaced; 2,085 shp (1,555 kW) submerged
- Propulsion: (as built) 4 × Winton Model 16-201A 16-cylinder two-cycle diesel engines, 1,300 hp (970 kW) each, driving electrical generators through reduction gears; 2 × 120-cell Exide VL31B batteries; 4 × high-speed Elliott electric motors, 3 × General Motors six-cylinder four-cycle 6-228 auxiliary diesels; (re-engined 1942) 4 × GM two-cycle Model 12-278A diesels, 1,200 hp (890 kW) each; two shafts
- Speed: 19.5 kn (22.4 mph; 36.1 km/h) surfaced; 8.25 kn (9.49 mph; 15.28 km/h) submerged
- Range: 6,000 nmi (6,900 mi; 11,000 km) at 10 kn (12 mph; 19 km/h); 21,000 nmi (24,000 mi; 39,000 km) at 10 kn (12 mph; 19 km/h) with fuel in the main ballast tanks
- Endurance: 10 hours at 5 kn (5.8 mph; 9.3 km/h); 36 hours at minimum speed
- Test depth: 250 ft (76 m)
- Capacity: 85,946–86,675 US gal (325,340–328,100 L)
- Complement: 5 officers, 49 enlisted
- Armament: 6 × 21 inch (533 mm) torpedo tubes (four forward, two aft, 16 torpedoes); 1 × 4 in (100 mm)/50 cal deck gun; 2 × 0.30 in (7.6 mm) machine guns

USS Shark (SS-174) was a Porpoise-class submarine, the fifth ship of the United States Navy to be named for the shark.

== Construction and commissioning ==
Shark′s keel was laid down by the Electric Boat Company in Groton, Connecticut, on 24 October 1933. She was launched on 21 May 1935, sponsored by Miss Ruth Ellen Lonergan, the 12-year-old daughter of United States Senator Augustine Lonergan of Connecticut, and commissioned on 25 January 1936.

== Inter-war period ==
=== Asiatic Fleet ===
Following shakedown in the North Atlantic and the Caribbean Sea, Shark transited the Panama Canal and arrived at San Diego, California on 4 March 1937. She spent the next year and one-half in training exercises and Army-Navy war problems as a unit of Submarine Squadron 6 (SubRon 6). Following a regular overhaul at Mare Island Navy Yard, Vallejo, California, Shark got underway from San Diego on 16 December 1938 bound for Pearl Harbor and reassignment to SubRon 4.

Following two years of operations in the Hawaii area, Shark set sail from Pearl Harbor on 3 December 1940 to join the Asiatic Fleet based at Manila, where she engaged in fleet tactics and exercises until the Japanese attack on Pearl Harbor. Departing Manila on 9 December 1941, she was at sea during the Japanese bombing raids on Manila the next day. For the next week, Shark patrolled Tayabas Bay until ordered back to Manila on 19 December to embark Admiral Thomas C. Hart, Commander-in-Chief, Asiatic Fleet, for transportation to Soerabaja, Java.

== World War II ==
On 6 January 1942, Shark was almost hit by a torpedo from an Imperial Japanese Navy submarine. A few days later, she was ordered to Ambon Island, where a Japanese invasion was expected. On 27 January, she was directed to join the submarines patrolling in Molucca Passage, then to cover the passage east of Lifamatola and Bangka Strait. On 2 February 1942, Shark reported to her base at Soerabaja, Java, that she had been depth-charged 10 nautical miles (19 km; 12 mi) off Tifore Island and had failed to sink a Japanese ship during a torpedo attack. On 7 February, she reported chasing an empty cargo ship headed northwest, after which the Asiatic Fleet submarine commander, Captain John E. Wilkes, upbraided her CO, LCDR Louis Shane, JR for making unnecessary reports that might reveal her position. No further messages were received from Shark. On 8 February, she was told to proceed to Makassar Strait and later was told to report information. Nothing was heard and, on 7 March 1942, Shark was reported as presumed lost, the victim of unknown causes. She was struck from the Naval Vessel Register on 24 June 1942.

Shark may have been the first U.S. submarine sunk by enemy antisubmarine forces. Post-war, Japanese records showed numerous attacks on unidentified submarines in Shark's area at plausible times. At 01:37 on 11 February, for example, the Japanese destroyer Yamakaze opened fire with her 5-inch (127 mm) guns and sank a surfaced submarine. Yamakaze′s crew heard voices in the water, but made no attempt to rescue possible survivors.

== Awards ==
- Asiatic-Pacific Campaign Medal with one battle star for World War II service
