= List of friendly fire incidents =

There have been many thousands of friendly fire incidents in recorded military history, accounting for an estimated 2% to 20% of all casualties in battle. The examples listed below illustrate their range and diversity, but this does not reflect increasing frequency. The rate of friendly fire, once allowance has been made for the numbers of troops committed to battle, has remained remarkably stable over the past 200 years.

== Wars of the Roses ==
- 1471 – During the Battle of Barnet, a Lancastrian force under the Earl of Oxford was fired on by the Lancastrian centre while returning from a pursuit; their banner, Oxford's "star with rays" had been mistaken for the Yorkist "sun in splendour". This gave rise to cries of treachery (always a possibility in that chaotic period), Lancastrian morale collapsed, and the battle was lost.

== English Civil War ==
- 1643 – Following the fall of Gainsborough, Lincolnshire to Roundhead forces, captured Royalist commander, the Earl of Kingston, was killed by Royalist cannon fire when the boat transporting him to Hull was fired on from the banks of the River Trent.

== Nine Years' War ==
- 1690 – Two French regiments accidentally attacked each other during the Battle of Fleurus, which led to the practice of attaching a white scarf to the flags of the regiments.

== War of the Spanish Succession ==
- 1708 - The Battle of Oudenaarde ended in confusion for the Allied victors. The darkness caused their right and left wings to mistake each other for French troops and engage in friendly fire. Eugene of Savoy on the right and the Prince of Orange on the left intervened and put an end to the friendly fire before the Allied army inflicted serious damage on itself.

== French and Indian War ==
- July 9, 1755 – Two main phases of friendly fire occurred during the Battle of the Monongahela, which halted the Braddock Expedition after French regulars, French militia and Indians joined battle with them before Fort Duquesne. In the obscuring woodland conditions and confusion caused by the French musket fire and the Native Americans' war cries, several British platoons fired at each other. Later in the battle many provincial troops fled from more exposed ground and into nearby woods, where regular soldiers fired on them mistaking them for advancing French infantry.
- November 12, 1758 – Friendly fire occurred near Fort Ligonier, resulting "in the accidental death of many of George Washington's fellow Virginians under his command, while also resulting in the capture of French prisoners who provided intelligence that led to the successful taking of Fort Duquesne by the British army."

== American Revolutionary War ==
- In the Battle of Germantown in 1777, a combination of late arrival, poor navigation and overpursuit resulted in Major General Adam Stephen's men colliding with General Anthony Wayne's troops. The two Continental Army brigades opened fire on each other, became badly disorganized, and fled.
- In the Battle of Guilford Courthouse on March 15, 1781, after several volleys of musket and cannon fire broke out, smoke began to obscure soldiers' view of the battlefield. In a pitched battle, smoke not only limited visibility but irritated soldiers' eyes and could make breathing difficult. In the confusion, British Lieutenant John Macleod, in command of two British three-pounders, was directed by British Lieutenant General Charles Cornwallis to fire on the Americans who were in close combat with the British. Many British soldiers died as a result of friendly artillery bombardment.

== Austro-Turkish War ==
- The Battle of Karánsebes in 1788, which only involved Austrian Imperial Army forces, started with a dispute over schnapps between Hussars and infantry of the Austrian vanguard which escalated into armed combat. The ensuing chaos involved even more Austrian forces, leaving 150 dead and 1200 wounded. The Ottoman Forces arrived only after the Austrians withdrew.

== French Revolutionary and Napoleonic Wars ==
- 1796 – Battle of Fombio: In a night of confused fighting when Austrian units had stumbled into his army's position, French general Amadee Laharpe was shot dead by his own men while returning from reconnaissance.
- 1801 – Second Battle of Algeciras: Spanish ships Real Carlos and San Hermenegildo mistakenly engaged each other in the dark after HMS Superb sailed between them and fired at both. 1,700 were killed when the two ships exploded.
- 1806 – On 30 November, at 10 pm, HMS Dart and Wolverine came upon a ship that they suspected was a French privateer and that kept up a running fight until morning, only surrendering after her captain and several of her crew had been wounded, of whom six later died. The vessel turned out to be the British merchant ship Mary.
- 1809 – Battle of Wagram: French troops mistakenly fired on their allies from the Kingdom of Saxony. The grey uniforms of the Saxons were misidentified as white, the colour of uniform worn by their Austrian enemy.
- 1815 – Battle of Quatre Bras: Soldiers of the Dutch 3rd Light Cavalry Brigade disengaging and retiring from a skirmish against the French were fired on by Scottish highlanders who mistook their uniforms for those of French chasseurs a cheval.

- Battle of Waterloo: Prussian artillery mistakenly fired on British artillery causing many casualties, and British artillery returned fire at the Prussians.

== Texas Revolution ==
- Both sides, Texians and Mexicans, in the Siege of the Alamo in 1836, had friendly fire incidents:

- In early hours of 1 March, a mounted party of Texian volunteers arriving at gallop to reinforce the Alamo garrison were fired at by defenders who mistook them in the dark for attacking Mexican horsemen, wounding one of them, before the sentries were called to open the gates for them.
- At the Mexicans' final mass assault (overnight 5–6 March), some of the veteran troops leading it were wounded or killed when shot by untrained recruits in the ranks behind who "blindly fir[ed] their guns", and when all the defenders had been killed, Mexicans continued to shoot Mexicans in mistake during the darkness.

== American Civil War ==
- During the Battle of Shiloh on 6 April 1862, Confederate General Albert Sidney Johnston was fatally wounded by a bullet that hit the back of his right knee when riding in advance of his troops. There were no Union troops observed to have got behind him and the bullet was identified by his surgeon as from a Pattern 1853 Enfield rifle, which was standard issue in the Confederate Army but not the Union troops present.
- Confederate Lieutenant General Thomas "Stonewall" Jackson was wounded as a result of friendly fire in the Battle of Chancellorsville on 2 May 1863, and died eight days later. He and some of his men had been returning, under the cover of night, from an intelligence-gathering mission when Confederate troops of the 18th North Carolina Infantry misidentified them as a Union cavalry scout team; as a result, the North Carolina troops opened fire.
- In the Battle of the Wilderness on 6 May 1864, Confederate Lt. General James Longstreet was wounded when his mounted column from the First Corps was mistaken for Federal troops. As a result of this, he did not return to command until October of that year. In the same incident, Brigadier General Micah Jenkins was mortally wounded after being struck in the head.
- In the early hours of 6 March 1865, the Union vessel USS Peterhoff was en route to blockade Wilmington, North Carolina when she was rammed and sunk by USS Monticello after being mistaken for a blockade runner. All hands were rescued before she sank.

== Russo-Japanese War ==
- Dogger Bank Incident (overnight 21/22 October 1904) – In what can be classified literally as a case of fog of war, battleships of the Imperial Russian Navy's Baltic Fleet en route to reinforce in the Far East, fired on a fleet of British fishing trawlers in the North Sea, mistaking them for Imperial Japanese Navy torpedo boats after misunderstanding signals. One fishing vessel was sunk, four were damaged, and two fishermen were killed and six wounded. In the general chaos that ensued, the cruisers Aurora and Dmitrii Donskoi were also taken for Japanese warships in the fog and bombarded by seven battleships sailing in formation, damaging both ships and killing at least one Russian sailor and severely wounding another, and fatally wounding a naval chaplain. During the pandemonium, several Russian ships signalled that torpedoes had hit them, and on board the battleship Borodino, rumours spread that the ship was being boarded by the Japanese, with some crew members donning life vests and lying prone on the deck and others drawing cutlasses to repel a boarding before a ceasefire was signalled.
- 13 November 1904 – The Imperial Russian Navy destroyer Stroini struck a Russian naval mine and sank in Korea Bay off Port Arthur, China.

== World War I ==
=== 1914 ===
- Battle of Dinant 21–23 August – It is believed that some parties of German infantry entering the Belgian city of Dinant in a nighttime assault, fired at each other in the darkness while under fire from French troops. The Germans mistakenly believed that hostile Belgian civilians had fired on them, contributing to a conviction among their troops that Belgian civilians were actively fighting them. This led to arrests and massacres of local civilians when the town was invaded and occupied. On the 23rd, German artillery mistakenly fired on infantry who were occupying and barricading a street; the latter units were temporarily forced to withdraw, having shot a man held as a human shield accused of having been a franc-tireur in earlier fighting.
- 28 August – During the Battle of Heligoland Bight, a British submarine mistook the British light cruiser HMS Southampton for an Imperial German Navy warship and fired two torpedoes at her, which missed. Assuming the submarine to be German, Southampton attempted to ram her, but she escaped without damage.
- 4 November – While attempting to exit the anchorage at Schillig Roads in the Heligoland Bight in fog, the Imperial German Navy armored cruiser SMS Yorck entered a German minefield, struck two mines, and quickly sank at 53°40′N 008°05′E with the loss of at least 338 and perhaps as many as 502 lives, according to different sources.

=== 1915 ===
- 21 January – The Imperial German Navy submarine U-7 was torpedoed and sunk in the North Sea by the German submarine U-22, which had mistaken her for an enemy submarine. Twenty-four of U-7′s crew were killed, and only one survived.
- Battle of Bolimów 31 January – The German Ninth Army launched the first large scale poison tear gas attack on the Russian Second Army in Poland, firing 18,000 gas shells. However the wind blew the gas back onto the German lines, causing a few casualties which could have been higher had the winter cold not frozen the ingredient xylyl bromide. The attack was called off, the counter-attacking Russians being successfully repelled by conventional artillery shellfire.
- 25 September – In the first gas attack launched by British forces prior to their infantry attack that opened the Battle of Loos, about 140 long tons (140 t) of chlorine gas was released, aimed at the German Sixth Army's positions on the Hohenzollern Redoubt but in places the gas was blown back by wind onto the trenches of the British First Army. Due to the inefficiency of the contemporary gas masks, many soldiers removed them as they could not see through the fogged-up talc eyepieces or could barely breathe with them on. This led to some being affected by their own gas, as it blew back across their lines or lingered in no man's land, immediately causing the death of 10 and injury to about 2,000 British soldiers.

=== 1916 ===
- 8 May – During the Battle of Verdun, when the French outpost Fort Douaumont was occupied by German infantry, a careless cooking fire detonated grenades, flamethrower fuel and an ammunition cache. Hundreds of soldiers were killed instantly in the firestorm, including the entire 12th Grenadiers regimental staff. Worse, some of the 1,800 wounded and soot blackened survivors attempting to escape the inferno were mistaken for attacking French Colonial African infantry and were fired upon by their comrades. In all, 679 German soldiers perished in this fire.
- 2 June – On the opening of the Battle of Mount Sorrel in the Ypres Salient of Belgium, the commanding officer of the 3rd Canadian Division, Major General Malcolm Mercer, and his aide Captain Lynam Gooderham, were wounded and trapped when German artillery opened fire on divisional trenches they were inspecting. They ran into rifle crossfire when attempting to evade advancing German infantry, Mercer receiving a bullet in a leg, then remained overnight unhelped until 2 am next day when Mercer was killed by an exploding shell and Gooderham was taken prisoner by the Germans. A staff officer later claimed the fatal shell was British and Mercer is upheld as the most senior Canadian officer killed in combat and by friendly fire.
- On the night of 4–5 August, during the First Battle of the Somme, the 13th Battalion of the Durham Light Infantry were fired on by Australian Artillery while in process of capturing and holding onto a German communication trench called Munster Alley.
- 17 September – During the same Battle of the Somme, a company of the 1st/7th Battalion of the Duke of Wellington's Regiment waiting to charge a German trench south of Thiepval, France, were strafed from behind by Stokes mortar fire, the most loss of life caused when their hand grenade store was hit, detonating its contents. The mortars had been issued their battalion only a few weeks before and inexperienced firers had set too short a range aiming at enemy lines. Despite this, company commander Captain Basil Lupton rallied the survivors and led a successful taking of the opposite trench.

=== 1917 ===
- 11 March – The Italian destroyer Euro and torpedo boat Airone sighted the Italian submarines F9 and F10 in the Mediterranean Sea off Messina, Sicily, mistook them for Central Powers submarines, and opened gunfire on them. The two submarines submerged and escaped damage.
- 17 March – The German submarine SM UB-40 sank the British hospital ship HMHS Lanfranc in the English Channel when she was ferrying wounded from Le Havre to Southampton. The passengers included 167 German prisoners of war, of whom 18 were killed and 15 wounded in the sinking.
- 16 September – At night in foul weather, the British submarine HMS G9 mistook the destroyer HMS Pasley for a German U-boat and attacked with torpedoes. Pasley, not recognising G9 as British until too late, responded to the attack by ramming G9. Nearly cut in two, G9 sank. Only one of the G9's crew members survived.
- 6 October – When the U.S. Navy armed yacht USS Nahma (SP-771) sighted the Italian cargo ship SS Bologna in the Atlantic Ocean approaching Gibraltar at 02:30, she mistook the Italian submarines H6 and H8, which were escorting Bologna, for Imperial German Navy U-boats. She opened gunfire on H8, firing four rounds before H8 identified herself as friendly. Nahma then approached H6, thought she saw crewmen on H6′s deck running to man H6′s deck gun, and fired one round, which hit H6′s conning tower, killing two men and wounding seven others, two of whom later died of their wounds. Nahma then identified H6 as friendly and ceased fire. At 05:00, the British Royal Navy torpedo boat HMS TB 93 arrived on the scene and accidentally fired one round at Nahma. Nahma sighted TB 93 at 05:20, mistook her for a German U-boat, and fired two rounds at her before identifying her as friendly.

=== 1918 ===
- 16 January – A United States Navy gun crew aboard the U.S. passenger ship SS New York mistakenly fired one shot at the U.S. Navy destroyer USS Jenkins, which was escorting New York. The shot hit Jenkins, killing one man and wounding four others.
- 23 January – Major William Robert Gregory, Royal Flying Corps, was shot down by mistake and killed by an Italian Corpo Aeronautico Militare pilot at Monastiero near Grossa, Padua, Italy. He inspired the poem, An Irish Airman Foresees His Death, by family friend W. B. Yeats.
- 24 February – The U.S. Navy destroyer USS Paulding sighted the periscope of the Royal Navy submarine HMS L2 in the Atlantic Ocean south of Ireland, opened gunfire on her and dropped two depth charges, forcing L2 to surface. The U.S. Navy destroyer USS Davis then dropped a depth charge near L2 and Paulding, Davis, and the U.S. Navy destroyer USS Trippe all opened gunfire on her. One round struck L2 before the destroyers ceased fire and Davis escorted her to Berehaven, Ireland.
- 12 March – The French airship AT-0 dropped four 52-kilogram (115 lb) bombs on the Royal Navy submarine HMS D3 in the English Channel off Fécamp, France, after mistaking her for an Imperial German Navy submarine and her recognition rockets for anti-aircraft fire. D3 sank with the loss of all hands.
- 26 March – At daybreak, the Royal Navy warship HMS Jeannette II sighted the French Navy submarine Watt in the Mediterranean Sea ahead of a convoy Jeannette II was escorting from Gibraltar to Bizerte, Tunisia. Watt submerged, and Jeannette II, assuming she was an enemy submarine, dropped two depth charges, forcing Watt to surface. Some ships in the convoy and another escort, the U.S. Navy armed yacht USS Wenonah (SP-165), opened gunfire on Watt. Wenonah fired 12 rounds at a range of 1,000 yards (910 m), inflicting considerable damage, killing Watt′s commanding officer and one of her crewmen and wounding four other men, before identifying Watt as friendly.
- 15 April – Two British soldiers from the Somerset Light Infantry were killed and C.S. Lewis was wounded after being hit by a shrapnel from a British shell that had fallen short of its target in Mont-Bernanchon, France.
- 24/25 April – During the Second Battle of Villers-Bretonneux, soldiers of the Australian 50th Infantry Battalion, advancing in the dark under German machine fire, attacked what they believed was an enemy trench. They found out that the trench was instead occupied by British troops of the 2nd Devon and 1st Worcester Battalions who had not been informed of the Australian counterattack and "thought the Germans were attacking them from the rear".
- 1 June – During the attack on the main wagon bridge over the Marne at Château-Thierry, American machine gunners described a night attack of massed German troops, who were singing gutturally as they made a suicidal charge, some linked arm in arm. The victims were soldiers of the French 10th Colonial division from Senegal, who had been trying to get back across the river. Although reports of the incident were suppressed, it was discussed by American and French soldiers. There are no German records of any attack on the wagon bridge.
- 16 June – During German spring offensive, the British 4th Battalion of the King's Shropshire Light Infantry (4th KSLI), with reinforcing elements of North Staffordshires and Cheshires, were shelled by British artillery who were unaware the position had changed hands, within 30 minutes of successfully taking a hill, Montagne de Bligny, from the Germans and capturing prisoners. The bombardment reduced the units' effective strength to 100 men but their commander, Captain Geoffrey Bright, insisted on retaining the hill and sending out for reinforcements from British units until help arrived before nightfall. For the overall action the 4th KSLI received a unit award of the French Croix de Guerre.
- 18 June – The U.S. Navy submarine chasers USS SC-94 and USS SC-151 opened gunfire on the British destroyers HMS Defender and HMS Nymphe in the Strait of Otranto after mistaking them for enemy submarines, SC-94 firing two rounds and SC-151 firing one. One round from SC-94 hit Nymphe, putting one of her steam engines out of commission.
- 20 June – The British destroyer HMS Acorn fired four or five shots at the U.S. Navy submarine chaser USS SC-151 in the Strait of Otranto. All missed.
- 13 July – British army officer and poet Siegfried Sassoon was wounded after being shot in the head by a fellow British soldier who had mistaken him for a German near Arras, France. As a result, he spent the remainder of the war in Britain.
- 16 July – British flying ace Major Awdry Vaucour was killed in the vicinity of Monastier di Treviso, Italy when he was accidentally shot down by an Italian pilot.
- 23 July – During a voyage from New York City to Europe as part of a five-ship convoy, the British armed troop transport SS Minnekahda opened gunfire on the U.S. Navy submarine USS N-3 (SS-55) in the Atlantic Ocean as she closed with N-3 from a range of 200 yards (183 m) to a range of only 50 yards (46 m), scoring one 6-or-7.5-inch (152 or 191 mm) hit (according to different sources) and inflicting considerable damage. One of the convoy′s escorts, the U.S. Navy destroyer USS Preble, then attempted to ram N-3, missing her by only a few feet. N-3 proceeded to port under her own power.
- 28 July – Canadian flying ace and future spymaster William Stephenson, then posted with No. 73 Squadron RAF, was shot down and crashed his Sopwith Camel biplane behind enemy lines in France. During the incident, he later claimed, Stephenson was injured by fire not only from German ace pilot, Justus Grassmann, but also by friendly fire from a French observer. He was subsequently captured and held as a prisoner of war until he escaped in October 1918.
- 7 August – Steaming in the Atlantic Ocean as part of a 28-ship convoy, the U.S. armed cargo ship SS Jason sighted the U.S. Navy submarine USS O-6 behind the convoy, mistook her for an Imperial German Navy U-boat, and opened gunfire on her, firing eight rounds and scoring five hits at a range of 3,000 yards (2,700 m). O-6 sustained damage that prevented her from submerging. Jason ceased fire when she steamed out of range of O-6. A second merchant ship also opened fire on O-6, but all her shots fell short. The U.S. Navy destroyer USS Paul Jones then closed with O-6 and opened 3-inch (76.2 mm) gunfire, but all of her shots also fell short, and she ceased fire when she closed to a range of 3,000 yards (2,700 m) and identified O-6 as friendly. O-6 suffered no casualties.
- 27 August – Steaming in the Atlantic Ocean south of Long Island during a voyage from Bordeaux, France, to New York City, the American armed cargo ship SS Felix Taussig mistook the U.S. Navy submarine chaser USS SC-209 for an Imperial German Navy U-boat and opened gunfire on her, firing one 4-inch (102 mm) and four 3-inch (76.2 mm) rounds. Two of the 3-inch (76.2 mm) rounds struck SC-209, setting her on fire, and she sank in three minutes at 40°08′N 073°12′W with the loss of 18 lives, the largest U.S. Navy loss of life in a single friendly fire incident during World War I. The submarine chaser USS SC-188 rescued SC-209′s five survivors, four of whom were wounded.
- 6 September – An observation post at the Cabo da Roca Lighthouse sighted the Portuguese Navy submarine Golfinho while she was on the surface in the Atlantic Ocean off Cabo da Roca, Portugal, and reported her as an enemy submarine. Portuguese Navy minesweepers and patrol vessels closed on the reported sighting and one of them opened fire on Golfinho. Golfinho submerged and evaded the attacking ships without damage or casualties.
- 4 October – The nine companies from the U.S. Army's 77th Infantry Division which had pushed into a salient at Charlevaux, France and became known as the "Lost Battalion" after being surrounded by the Germans, were subjected to friendly artillery fire for several hours, either due to the artillery fire being inaccurate or the coordinates, delivered by carrier pigeon, being inaccurate. The overall commander, Major Charles Whittlesey, used his last carrier pigeon, named Cher Ami, to send a second message for the artillery to cease fire.
- 15 October – British submarine HMS J6 was sunk by British Q-ship Cymric in the North Sea off the Northumberland Coast. Cymric's captain, Lieutenant F. Peterson RNR, mistook the identity lettering on the conning tower of J6 for U6. Assuming U6 to indicate a German U-boat, Peterson raised the White ensign and opened fire on J6. After a number of direct hits, J6 sank. It was only after the survivors were seen in the water that Peterson and the crew of Cymric realised their mistake and recovered the survivors. Of the crew of J6, 15 were lost; a subsequent court of enquiry found that no action should be taken against Peterson.

== Latvian War of Independence ==
- 6 March 1919 – Colonel Oskars Kalpaks was killed in command of his 1st Latvian Independent Battalion, when his unit had a mistaken skirmish with a German Freikorps party near Airītes in Saldus district. Both parties were allied in a counterattack on the Soviet Army occupying Latvia.

== Spanish Civil War ==
- On 19 February 1937, the Nationalist Irish Brigade was fired upon by a Falangist unit, and the hour-long firefight resulted in 11 deaths. Neither unit had had any battle experience.
- On 30 April 1937, the Nationalist battleship España hit a Nationalist-laid mine and sank, killing four sailors.

== World War II ==
=== 1939 ===
- 6 September – Just five days after the start of the war, in what was dubbed the Battle of Barking Creek, three Royal Air Force Spitfires from 74 Squadron shot down two Hurricanes from the RAF's 56 Squadron, killing one of the pilots. One of the Spitfires was then shot down by British anti-aircraft artillery while returning to base.
- 10 September – The British submarine HMS Triton sank another British submarine, HMS Oxley. After making challenges which went unanswered Triton assumed she must have located a German U-boat and fired two torpedoes. Oxley was the first Royal Navy vessel to be sunk and also the first vessel to be sunk by a British vessel in the war, killing 52 with only two survivors. Both vessels were patrolling off the coast of Norway (then neutral) at the time. The incident that led to the loss of Oxley was kept in secrecy until the 1950s.
- 3 December – British submarine HMS Snapper sustained a direct hit from a British aircraft while returning to Harwich after a patrol in the North Sea, but without taking damage.

=== 1940 ===
- 19 February – During Operation Wikinger the German destroyer Z1 Leberecht Maass was sunk by Luftwaffe bombs while another destroyer, the Z3 Max Schultz, was sunk by mines in the confusion. A total of 606 Kriegsmarine sailors were killed.
- 10 April - First Battle of Narvik. During the first British naval sortie into German-held Narvik harbour, HMS Hostile torpedoed merchant ships moored there. As well as eleven German ships, she also sank one British and two Norwegian merchant ships, as well as two (neutral) Swedish vessels.
- 14 April – The Dutch submarine HNLMS O 10 was bombed in error off Noordwijk by an RAF aircraft.
- 10 May – German Luftwaffe bombers sent to bomb Dijon in France instead bombed the German city of Freiburg due to navigation errors, killing 57 people.
- 11 May
  - During the Battle of Belgium the British 3rd Infantry Division, commanded by Major-General Bernard Law Montgomery were sent to take their pre-arranged position on the River Dyle near Leuven when they were mistaken that night for German paratroopers and fired on by the Belgian 10th Infantry Division who were holding the position. They gave way when, Montgomery claimed, he approached and offered to place himself under Belgian command.
  - At 23:57, the French submarine Amazone fired two torpedoes at what she identified as a German submarine in the North Sea at 52°55′N 004°28′E. Both torpedoes missed. The German submarine U-7 and the Royal Navy submarine HMS Shark both reported being attacked by a submarine in that area around that time, and Amazone′s target might have been Shark.
- 11–12 May –Battle of the Grebbeberg, The Netherlands: The 2nd Battalion of the Dutch 19th Infantry Regiment, ordered to make a night counterattack against positions newly seized by the Germans on 11 May, were fired on at the stopline by other Dutch troops who had been uninformed of the counterattack, causing it to be called off at dawn when order had been restored. (Fortunately for the Dutch a planned German night attack at that point had been called off because of their deterring supporting artillery fire.) They were ordered to counterattack again, after 1600 hours the following day, when, reaching the frontline, fellow troops again fired on them, causing the counterattack to peter out and be abandoned.
- 14 May – At midday German Luftwaffe fighters attacked at French town of Chemery-sur-Bar as the 1st Panzer Division were holding a victory parade following the battle of Bulsen, causing a few casualties.
- 20 May – The French Navy submarine Antiope mistook the French Navy submarine Sibylle for a German U-boat and fired three torpedoes at her in the North Sea off the coast of the Netherlands at 53°23′N 003°44′E at a range of 600 metres (660 yd); the torpedoes passed beneath Sybille.
- 21 May – A Royal Air Force Hurricane shot down Bristol Blenheim L9325 of No. 18 Squadron RAF. The Blenheim crashed near Arras, France. Its three crewmen were killed.
- 22 May – A Royal Air Force Spitfire shot down Bristol Blenheim L9266 of No. 59 Squadron RAF. The Blenheim crashed near Fricourt, France. Its three crewmen were killed.
- May (unknown date) – As the French Navy submarine Achille returned to her base at Dundee, Scotland, after a patrol in the Skagerrak that had begun on 7 May, a British bomber mistook her for a German submarine and attacked her in Dundee Channel, dropping five bombs. Achille suffered serious damage, particularly to her ballast tanks, propeller shafts, and hydrophones.
- 1 June – A Bristol Blenheim piloted by Alastair Panton was shot down by Northumberland Fusiliers while flying low over the beaches of Dunkirk in order to let the soldiers see the RAF was involved.
- 28 June – Italian Air Marshal Italo Balbo and his crew were killed when Italian anti-aircraft guns at Tobruk shot down their Savoia-Marchetti SM.79.
- 8 July – While the Vichy French submarine Le Glorieux was departing Dakar, Senegal, to attack British warships threatening Dakar during Operation Catapult, she suffered light damage when she came under heavy gunfire from three Vichy French warships and was bombed by a Vichy French seaplane, all of which mistook her for a British submarine attempting to infiltrate the harbor.
- 8 October – While on patrol in the Mediterranean, the Italian submarine Tricheco sank the Italian submarine Gemma in error.

=== 1941 ===
- 5 January – While flying an Airspeed Oxford for the ATA from Blackpool to RAF Kidlington near Oxford, Amy Johnson went off course in adverse weather conditions. Reportedly out of fuel, she bailed out as her aircraft crashed into the Thames Estuary but her body was never recovered. In 1999 it was reported that Tom Mitchell, at the time a RAF fighter pilot, claimed to have shot Johnson down when she twice failed to give the correct identification code during the flight. He said: "The reason Amy was shot down was because she gave the wrong colour of the day [a signal to identify aircraft known by all British forces] over radio." Mitchell explained how the aircraft was sighted and contacted by radio. A request was made for the signal. She gave the wrong one twice. "Sixteen rounds of shells were fired and the plane dived into the Thames Estuary. We all thought it was an enemy plane until the next day when we read the papers and discovered it was Amy. The officers told us never to tell anyone what happened."
- 4 February 1941 - RAF Flying Officer David Warburton was flying a Wellington bomber from No. 18 Operational Training Unit on a training mission within England with a mixture of Polish and British aircrew. While flying over Crewe, the bomber was hit by friendly fire from a Home Guard anti aircraft unit near the Rolls-Royce factory and subsequently collided with a barrage balloon, crashing and killing all on board.
- Bardia raid: On the night of 19/20 April, 450 British commandos conducted an amphibious raid against Axis forces in Bardia, Libya, to destroy an Italian supply dump and a coastal artillery battery (which were successful). While most men were successfully evacuated after the raid, one was killed by friendly fire from an overalert British commando soldier.
- 24 April – While laying signal buoys in the Mediterranean Sea off Cape Bon, Tunisia, the Italian torpedo boat Simone Schiaffino struck a mine that had just been laid by other Italian ships and sank within three minutes with the loss of over half her crew.
- 26 May – Fifteen Fleet Air Arm Fairey Swordfish torpedo bombers from the British aircraft carrier HMS Ark Royal attempting to carry out a torpedo attack against the German battleship Bismarck in the Atlantic Ocean mistakenly attacked the British light cruiser HMS Sheffield instead. They dropped 11 torpedoes, some of which exploded on contact with the water. The rest missed.
- 5 July – An Armstrong Whitworth Whitley V bomber aircraft, Z6667 of No. 10 Operational Training Unit RAF based at Abingdon, was on a night training flight when it broke up over Oxfordshire, crashed on Chiselhampton Hill and caught fire on impact. The crash was variously attributed to either interception by a Luftwaffe night fighter or friendly fire by a local anti-aircraft unit. All six crewmen were killed.
- 9 August – RAF fighter pilot Wing Commander Douglas Bader was shot down in what recent research suggests was a friendly fire incident.
- 29 August – A Focke-Wulf Fw 190 fighter was shot down in error by a German 8.8 cm antiaircraft gun near the French coast and crashed on the beach south of Dunkirk. Leutnant Heinz Schenk was the first Focke-Wulf 190 pilot to be killed in action.
- 26 November – A RAF aircraft bombed the 1st Essex Regiment during Operation Crusader, causing about 40 casualties.
- 7 December
  - During the Japanese attack on Pearl Harbor, confused and inexperienced naval gunners downed several US fighter aircraft that were sent from USS Enterprise to bolster the harbor defenses. Army pilot Lieutenant John L. Dains was also killed by friendly fire just after having shot down the first Japanese aircraft of the war.
  - During the evening, six VF-6 Wildcats attempted to land at Ford Island, but five were accidentally shot down by friendly anti-aircraft fire, killing three pilots and wounding two others.
  - The U.S. Navy light minelayer USS Gamble (DM-15) opened gunfire on the U.S. Navy submarine USS Thresher (SS-200) as Thesher surfaced so that she could enter Pearl Harbor to seek medical attention for a critically injured crewman. Thresher immediately submerged again.
- 8 December – Thresher again attempted to enter Pearl Harbor, but a U.S. Navy patrol plane drove her off with a depth-charge attack. Thresher′s injured crewman died before the submarine finally reached Pearl Harbor later in the day under escort by the seaplane tender USS Thornton (AVD-11).
- 20 December – Aircraft from the U.S. Navy aircraft carrier USS Enterprise (CV-6) mistakenly bombed the U.S. Navy submarine USS Pompano (SS-181) in the Pacific Ocean 400 nautical miles (741 km; 460 mi) bearing 261 degrees True from Pearl Harbor, Hawaii, and 190 nautical miles (352 km; 219 mi) from Johnston Atoll. Pompano suffered damage to her seams and fuel tanks.

=== 1942 ===
- 11 January – During the Battle of Manado, an Aichi E13A (Allied reporting name "Jake") floatplane from the Imperial Japanese Navy seaplane carrier Mizuho shot down an Imperial Japanese Navy Air Service Yokosuka L3Y (Allied reporting name "Tina") transport aircraft carrying Special Naval Landing Force paratroopers when the L3Y flew low over a Japanese anchorage near Manado in northern Celebes without responding to recognition signals.
- 31 January – The German blockade runner Spreewald was torpedoed and sunk by the German submarine U-333, captained by U-boat ace Peter-Erich Cremer, off Bordeaux.
- 20 February – British Commonwealth forces during the Burma Campaign were repeatedly bombed and strafed by Royal Air Force (RAF) Blenheims during a break-out attempt by a battalion surrounded by Japanese troops long the Sittaung River in Burma. More than 170 British Commonwealth lives were lost due to RAF airstrikes.
- 21 February – Pilots of the 1st American Volunteer Group (the "Flying Tigers") strafed retreating British Commonwealth forces who were mistaken for an advancing Japanese column during the Burma Campaign, resulting in more than 100 casualties. Around the same day, retreating British Commonwealth forces with 300 vehicles were bombed and strafed by RAF Blenheims near Mokpalin, Burma, resulting in more than 110 casualties and 159 vehicles destroyed.
- 24 February – A U.S. Navy PBY Catalina flying boat attacked the U.S. Navy submarine USS Thresher (SS-200) while Thresher was on the surface in the Pacific Ocean 523 nautical miles (969 km; 602 mi) bearing 266 degrees True from Barbers Point, Oahu, Hawaii. After submerging to a depth of 100 feet (30 m), Thresher heard three explosions, but suffered no damage or casualties.
- 25 February – Nine Imperial Japanese Navy Mitsubishi A6M Zero (Allied reporting name "Zeke") fighters escorting a Mitsubishi C5M (Allied reporting name "Babs") reconnaissance aircraft mistook the Imperial Japanese Navy submarines I-5 and I-6 for Royal Netherlands Navy submarines while I-5 and I-6 were on the surface in the waters of the Netherlands East Indies west of Timor. They made repeated strafing attacks. I-6 submerged and avoided damage and casualties, but I-5 suffered serious damage after a fire started within her conning tower and caused the explosion of signal rockets. I-5′s commanding officer and two other officers suffered severe injuries.
- 28 February
  - The U.S. Navy submarine USS Greenling (SS-213) suffered damage while conducting shakedown training from New London, Connecticut, when a PBY-5A Catalina amphibian of U.S. Navy Patrol Squadron 73 (VP-73) mistook her for a German U-boat and bombed her.
  - The U.S. Navy submarine USS S-17 (SS-122) was operating in the Panama Canal area at periscope depth when a United States Marine Corps plane dropped a 100-pound (45.4 kg) bomb targeting her periscope. Later in the day, the same or a different Marine Corps plane dropped a 100-pound (45.4 kg) bomb that landed within 50 yards (46 m) of her while she was on the surface. S-17 suffered no damage or casualties in either incident.
- 1 March before dawn – At the naval Battle of Sunda Strait, Japanese cruisers and destroyers fired Long Lance torpedoes against the Allied squadron. Many travelled too far and unexpectedly hit four Japanese auxiliary ships and sank all (one re-floated later). Many soldiers were rescued from the sea, including the 16th Army Commander Hitoshi Imamura.
- 4 March – A Royal Australian Air Force Lockheed Hudson patrol bomber mistook the U.S. Navy submarine USS Sargo (SS-188) for a Japanese submarine and attacked her at 13:38 while she was on the surface at 30°27′S 113°37′E. As she crash-dived, two bombs exploded as she reached a depth of 40 feet (12 m) and lifted her stern out of the water. She went out of control and plunged to a depth of 300 feet (91 m) before her crew could stop her dive, then rose rapidly and broached. She again submerged, and a second pair of bombs exploded. One of them detonated over her conning tower as she passed a depth of 50 feet (15 m), destroying the optics in both of her periscopes, damaging her conning tower door, conning tower upper hatch, and most of her lights and gauges, and knocking out all electrical power for 90 seconds. She remained submerged until after nightfall and arrived safely at Fremantle on 5 March 1942.
- 23 March – The U.S. Navy TC-class blimp TC-13 mistook the U.S. Navy submarine USS Gato (SS-212) for a Japanese submarine and attacked her with four 325-pound (147 kg) depth charges while Gato was at periscope depth in the Pacific Ocean off the entrance to San Francisco Bay. Gato suffered extensive damage but no casualties.
- Ca. March 1942 – An Allied aircraft attacked the U.S. Navy submarine USS Drum (SS-228) as she made a transit from the United States East Coast to the Panama Canal.
- 8 April – An aircraft identified by the crew of the U.S. Navy submarine USS Mackerel (SS-204) as a United States Army Air Forces P-38 Lightning fighter dropped four bombs which straddled Mackerel′s track while Mackerel was conducting exercises with the U.S. Navy patrol vessel USS Sapphire (PYc-2) 3 nautical miles (5.6 km; 3.5 mi) south of the Watch Hill buoy off Watch Hill, Rhode Island. The bombs ricocheted 100 feet (30 m) off the water and did not explode. Neither Mackerel or Sapphire, which was 1,000 yards (910 m) from Mackerel at the time, suffered damage or casualties.
- 14 April
  - An RAF fighter pilot fired on the audience during a demonstration of ground attack tactics at Imber training ground, Wiltshire, England, after mistaking them for dummy targets in mist. 25 killed and 71 wounded.
  - After sighting a German U-boat in the Atlantic Ocean about 100 nautical miles (185 km; 115 mi) off Cape Charles, Virginia, which had fired two torpedoes at her and one at her escort — the United States Coast Guard cutter USCGC Legare (WSC-144), which was about 2,000 yards (1,830 m) astern of her — the U.S. Navy submarine USS Mackerel (SS-204) fired two torpedoes at the U-boat, which disappeared into the darkness. Legare sighted a torpedo headed directly for her which her crew thought Mackerel had fired, and took evasive action. The torpedo passed down Legare′s port side at a distance of only 20 yards (18 m). A subsequent investigation of the incident by the Eastern Sea Frontier concluded that Mackerel had mistakenly fired a torpedo at Legare.
- 20 April – A U.S. Army Air Forces aircraft dropped depth charges on the U.S. Navy submarine USS Flying Fish (SS-229) in the Pacific Ocean three days into her voyage from Balboa in the Panama Canal Zone to Pearl Harbor, Hawaii. Flying Fish submerged and avoided damage.
- 21 April – In the aftermath of the Doolittle Raid, the Imperial Japanese Navy seaplane tender Akitsushima opened fire on an approaching Japanese transport plane her crew mistook for a United States Army Air Forces B-25 Mitchell medium bomber off Wadamisaki, Kobe, Japan. Splinters from her anti-aircraft shells struck the nearby Japanese passenger ship Tennyo Maru, prompting Tennyo Maru to transmit a mistaken report that the plane had attacked her with machine-gun fire.
- 24–25 April – The Imperial Japanese Army armed transport Urajio Maru mistakenly opened gunfire on the Imperial Japanese Navy submarine I-10 while I-10 was on an overnight voyage from Singapore to Penang in Japanese-occupied British Malaya. I-10 escaped without damage or casualties.
- May–September 1942 – During the Zhejiang-Jiangxi Campaign, around 1,700 Japanese troops died out of a total 10,000 Japanese soldiers who fell ill with disease when their own biological weapons attack intended for Chinese civilians and soldiers rebounded on their own forces.
- 1 May – The U.S. Navy submarine USS Grenadier (SS-210) mistakenly sank the Soviet merchant ship Angarstroi in the East China Sea about 90 nautical miles (170 km; 100 mi) west-southwest of Nagasaki, Japan.
- 2 May – The Polish submarine ORP Jastrząb was mistakenly sunk by the Royal Norwegian Navy destroyer HNoMS St Albans and minesweeper HMS Seagull while on a convoy to Murmansk. She was attacked with depth charges and made to surface, there she was strafed with the loss of five crew and six injured, including the commander, despite lighting yellow recognition smoke candles. The ship was damaged and had to be scuttled.
- 4 May – The United States Navy Armed Guard detachment aboard the American tanker El Lago mistook the U.S. Navy submarine USS Mackerel (SS-204) for a German U-boat and opened gunfire on her off the coast of Rhode Island about 4 nautical miles (7.4 km; 4.6 mi) south of Watch Hill Light at 41°18′N 071°47′W. Mackerel sustained no damage.
- 6 May: Two Imperial Japanese Navy Mitsubishi G4M1 (Allied reporting name "Betty") bombers mistook the Imperial Japanese Navy submarine I-8 for an Allied submarine and attacked her off Roi-Namur at Kwajalein Atoll, dropping eight 60-kilogram (132 lb) bombs and inflicting damage on I-8 that prevented her from submerging.
- 7 May: During the Battle of the Coral Sea, TF 44, a joint Australia–U.S. warship force, was mistakenly bombed by three U.S. Army B-17s, but it sustained no damage.
- 30 May – A U.S. Navy OS2U-2 Kingfisher floatplane dropped a depth charge on the U.S. Navy submarine USS R-18 (SS-95) as R-18 crash-dived in the Atlantic Ocean 50 nautical miles (93 km; 58 mi) bearing 50 degrees from Bermuda′s Mount Hill Lighthouse. R-18 sustained no damage.
- 7 June – Twelve U.S. Army Air Forces B-17 Flying Fortress bombers sighted the U.S. Navy submarine USS Grayling (SS-209) while Grayling was on the surface in the vicinity of Midway Atoll in the Northwestern Hawaiian Islands, and three of them attacked her with a string of twenty 1,000-pound (454 kg) bombs dropped from an altitude of more than 10,000 feet (3,000 m), all of which missed. Grayling crash-dived, and the B-17 crews claimed to have sunk a Japanese heavy cruiser in 15 seconds.
- 8 June – The Italian submarine Alagi sank the Italian destroyer Antoniotto Usodimare.
- 11 June – A U.S. Navy floatplane mistook the U.S. Navy submarine USS S-28 (SS-133) for a Japanese submarine and attacked her in the Pacific Ocean south of the Aleutian Islands at 53°57′25″N 164°30′00″W, dropping a bomb or depth charge as S-28 crash-dived that inflicted only slight damage and no casualties.
- 15 June – In the last stages of the Italian fleet attack on Harpoon convoy, German Ju 88 bombers targeted the Italian squadron without inflicting any damage.
- 21 June – The Royal Canadian Navy minesweeper HMCS Georgian rammed and sank the Royal Navy submarine HMS P.514 in the Atlantic Ocean off Newfoundland after P.514 did not reply to her challenge. P.514 was lost with all hands.
- 27 June – A group of RAF Vickers Wellington aircraft bombed the units of 4th County of London Yeomanry (Sharpshooters), British 7th Armoured Division and the British 3rd Hussars during a two-hour raid near Mersa Matruh, Egypt, killing over 359 troops and wounding 560. The aftermath of RAF raids at this time were also seen by the Germans: "... The RAF had bombed their own troops, and with tracer flying in all directions, German units fired on each other. At 0500 hours next morning 28 June, I drove up to the breakout area where we had spent such a disturbed night. There we found a number of lorries filled with the mangled corpses of New Zealanders who had been killed by the British bombs ...
- 13 July – The U.S. Navy submarine USS S-16 (SS-121) was patrolling on the surface in the Caribbean Sea off Panama when she suffered damage from bombs accidentally dropped near her by United States Army Air Forces planes attacking the German U-boat U-153. The damage prevented S-16 from diving, and she proceeded to port on the surface.
- 3 August – A four-engine United States Army Air Forces bomber approached the U.S. Navy submarine USS S-13 (SS-118) while she was patrolling on the surface in the Gulf of Panama off Balboa, Panama, at the Pacific entrance to the Panama Canal at 07°32′N 090°50′W and mistakenly attacked her, dropping a number of bombs into the water near her, one of which exploded. S-13 then exchanged recognition signals with the bomber, which departed without further incident. S-13 suffered no casualties or damage.
- 4 August – At 14:20, a U.S. plane attacked the U.S. Navy submarine USS S-17 at 11°34′N 078°36′W with four 500-pound (227 kg) depth charges while S-17 was operating on the surface in the Caribbean Sea, inflicting damage that prevented S-17 from diving. S-17′s crew identified the attacking aircraft as a U.S. Army Air Forces B-25 Mitchell bomber, and one source describes it as a U.S. Navy PV-1 Ventura patrol bomber, but an official report on the incident identifies the plane as a U.S. Army Air Forces B-18 Bolo bomber.
- 16 August – U.S. Navy yard patrol boats mistakenly depth-charged the U.S. Navy submarine USS S-11 (SS-116) off Cape Mala on Panama′s Pacific coast after they mistook her for a Japanese submarine. She suffered minor damage.
- 19 August - In the Dieppe Raid, the RAF lost 5 of its bomber/fighter aircraft deployed through being shot down by naval anti-aircraft gunners of their own side, and a Typhoon was shot down by a Spitfire fighter.
- 25 August – The United States Coast Guard Cutter USCGC Cartigan (WSC-120) opened gunfire on the U.S. Navy submarine USS R-2 (SS-79) near Key West, Florida. R-2 sustained no damage.
- 28 August – A U.S. Navy PBY Catalina flying boat depth-charged the U.S. Navy submarine USS S-31 (SS-136) as S-31 crash-dived to 125 feet (38 m) in the Pacific Ocean 30 nautical miles (56 km; 35 mi) southeast of Agattu in the Aleutian Islands at 51°53′N 174°27′E. S-31 sustained no damage.
- 12 September – In the first of three friendly fire incidents during the Laconia incident, the German submarine U-156 sank RMS Laconia, a British transport carrying 1,793 Italian prisoners-of-war among its passengers, in the Atlantic Ocean off West Africa. Ultimately, 1,420 of the Italians died. Italy was then Germany's ally.
- 13 September – Two U.S. Army Air Forces P-38 Lightning fighters — misidentified by S-31′s crew as two Imperial Japanese Navy Mitsubishi A6M Zero (Allied reporting name "Zeke") fighters — strafed the U.S. Navy submarine USS S-31 (SS-136) as S-31 crash-dived in the Pacific Ocean 8 nautical miles (15 km; 9.2 mi) south of Adak Island in the Aleutian Islands, just west of Kagalaska Strait at 51°36′N 176°26′W.
- 16 September – In the second of three friendly fire incidents during the Laconia incident, a U.S. Army Air Forces B-24 Liberator received orders to attack the German submarine U-156 during the mass rescue of Laconia′s siurvivors, despite the pilot having earlier received a signal conveyed by a Royal Air Force officer from U-156 that indicated that Allied passengers were on board and despite the submarine flying the Red Cross flag. The B-24 attacked U-156, prompting U-156 to cast off Laconia′s survivors in order to crash-dive to avoid the attack. U-156 abandoned her rescue attempts, and was incorrectly reported sunk in the action.
- 17 September – In the third of three friendly fire incidents during the Laconia incident, a U.S. Army Air Forces B-25 Mitchell bomber attacked the German submarine U-506, which was carrying 151 Laconia survivors. The attack failed to disable U-506.
- 28 September – A PBY-5 Catalina flying boat of U.S. Navy Patrol Squadron 101 (VP-101) mistook the U.S. Navy submarine USS Snapper (SS-185) for a Japanese submarine and attacked her in the Indian Ocean 330 nautical miles (611 km; 380 mi) south-southwest of Bali at a position given by Snapper as 12°59′S 113°42′E and by the PBY-5 as 12°50′S 114°28′E. Snapper crash-dived, and the PBY-5 dropped one depth charge that shook her as she passed through a depth of 140 feet (43 m) on her way to 250 feet (76 m). Snapper suffered only superficial damage and no casualties.
- 12 October – The U.S. Navy destroyer USS Duncan (DD-485) received friendly fire during the Battle of Cape Esperance, a night surface action off Guadalcanal in the Solomon Islands. Damged as well by heavy Japanese gunfire, Duncan was abandoned and sank six miles north of Savo Island.
- 23 October – During the 2nd Battle of El Alamein, at 2140 hours under the cover of a barrage of 1000 guns, British infantry of the 51st (Highland) Infantry Division advanced towards the enemy lines. However, they advanced too fast into the area of fire from British artillery, causing over 60 casualties.
- During the 2nd Battle of El Alamein, RAF fighters bombed British troops during a four-hour raid, causing 56 casualties. The British 10th Royal Hussars were among the victims; they did not know the proper signals to call off their planes.
- 26 October — During the Battle of the Santa Cruz Islands, USS Porter was forced to be scuttled after being hit by an errant torpedo from a friendly Grumman TBF Avenger that had been damaged and forced to ditch nearby. Ironically, the torpedo came from the very aircraft that they were going to rescue.
- 8 November – On the morning of the Operation Torch landings in French North Africa, a U.S. Army Air Forces P-40 Warhawk fighter strafed the U.S. Navy submarine USS Gunnel (SS-253) in the Atlantic Ocean off Casablanca, French Morocco. A few hours later, an aircraft identified by Gunnel′s crew as an American bomber attacked Gunnel, which submerged and whose crew heard an explosion as she passed a depth of 150 feet (46 m). Gunnel suffered no damage or casualties in either attack.
- 11 November – British submarine HMS Unbeaten completed Operation Bluestone, landing an agent in Spain near Bayona, then completed her patrol in the Bay of Biscay and was returning to the UK when she went missing. It is believed that she was probably attacked and sunk in error by an RAF Wellington bomber of No. 172 Squadron, Coastal Command in the Bay of Biscay. She was lost with all hands.
- During the night attack of 12/13 November in the Naval Battle of Guadalcanal, the already damaged light cruiser USS Atlanta was fired on by the cruiser USS San Francisco, causing several deaths, including Rear Admiral Norman Scott.
- 20 November – Numerous Allied pilots reported being shot at by friendly naval forces during the Torch landings in North Africa. In one such incident, a 202 Squadron Catalina flying boat was shot down with the loss of all 10 aircrew.
- 26 November – A U.S. Army Air Forces North American B-25 Mitchell bomber mistook the U.S. Navy submarine USS Swordfish (SS-193) for a Japanese submarine and attacked her while she was on the surface off Cape Ward Hunt, New Guinea. She crash-dived, and had reached a depth of 120 feet (37 m) when four bombs detonated across her stern, inflicting no damage or casualties.
- 29 November – At a position in the Pacific Ocean off California which the armed tanker SS Huguenot reported as 34°49′N 121°22′W but actually was in the vicinity of 33°50′N 120°00′W, Huguenot opened gunfire on the U.S. Navy submarine USS Tunny (SS-282). Tunny pulled away at high speed to a range of 14,000 yards (12,800 m) and avoided damage.
- 7 December – The United States Army transport USAT Florida opened gunfire on the U.S. Navy submarine USS R-16 (SS-93) in the Caribbean Sea. R-16 submerged and avoided damage.

=== 1943 ===
- 21 January – German army general Karl Eibl was killed northwest of Stalingrad during a chaotic retreat in the wake of Soviet Operation Little Saturn when Italian soldiers, mistaking his command vehicle for a Soviet armoured car, blew it up with hand grenades.
- 4 February – After the United States Navy submarine USS Grouper (SS-214) penetrated between the two columns of a Japanese convoy, Allied aircraft arrived and began bombing the convoy while Grouper was at periscope depth, endangering Grouper and forcing her to go deep.
- 6 February – The Imperial Japanese Navy submarine Ro-100 suffered minor damage when an Imperial Japanese Navy Air Service Aichi E13A1 (Allied reporting name "Jake") floatplane mistakenly bombed her while she was in the Bismarck Sea northwest of Rabaul.
- 7 February – A United States Army Air Forces B-17 Flying Fortress bomber mistakenly attacked the U.S. Navy submarine USS Swordfish (SS-193) while she was on the surface 240 nautical miles (444 km; 276 mi) north-northeast of Kavieng, New Ireland, at 00°12′N 152°00′E. Swordfish′s crew heard machine-gun bullets striking her conning tower as she crash-dived, followed by an explosion, and she descended to a depth of 170 feet (52 m) before her crew regained control of her and stabilized her at a depth of 90 feet (27 m). Her damage was significant enough to force her to terminate her patrol early and head to Pearl Harbor, Hawaii, for repairs.
- 16 February – The U.S. Navy submarine USS Sawfish (SS-276) mistakenly sank the Soviet merchant ship Kola in the Pacific Ocean.
- 17 February – The U.S. Navy submarine USS Sawfish (SS-276) mistakenly sank the Soviet merchant ship Ilmen in the Pacific Ocean.
- 3 March – The German blockade runner and minelayer Doggerbank was mistaken for a British freighter and sunk by the submarine U-43 in the mid-Atlantic. (It was a British made merchant vessel that had been captured in 1941 and impressed into German service.) Of the 365 men on board (the greater part Allied prisoners-of-war), only one German crewman survived.
- 13 March – Four U.S. Navy TBF-1 Avenger torpedo bombers dropped depth charges on the U.S. Navy submarine USS R-6 (SS-83) off the coast of Rhode Island 7 nautical miles (13 km; 8.1 mi) off the southwest corner of Block Island while R-6 was conducting torpedo exercises with the U.S. Navy patrol boat USS Sapphire (PYc-2) in Block Island Sound. R-6 suffered no damage or casualties.
- March – On an unrecorded date in March 1943 while the U.S. Navy submarine USS Scorpion (SS-278) was on the surface in the Pacific Ocean at about the midpoint of a voyage from the Panama Canal Zone to Pearl Harbor, Hawaii, an Allied merchant ship mistook her for a Japanese submarine and opened gunfire on her. The merchant ship's shells landed wide of Scorpion, and she proceeded with no damage or casualties, arriving at Pearl Harbor on 24 March.
- 20 April – The escorts of an Allied convoy opened gunfire on the Free French Naval Forces submarine Aréthuse while she was taking part in an exercise in the Bay of Arzew off Arzew, Algeria.
- 2 May – While the U.S. Navy submarine USS Harder (SS-257) was crossing the Caribbean Sea on the surface bound for the Panama Canal, an approaching U.S. Navy PBY Catalina flying boat responded to her recognition signals with machine-gun fire, then dropped two bombs, one of which shook Harder as she submerged.
- 9 May – The destroyers HMS Bicester and HMS Oakley, on deployment in the Mediterranean found themselves under air attack by Spitfire aircraft; Bicester sustained extensive damage from a near miss, with the bomb exploding alongside causing major flooding. Bicester was taken in tow to Malta for temporary repairs, and required permanent repairs in the United Kingdom, which were carried out between August and September.
- May – During the Battle of Attu (11–30 May), U.S. Army First Sergeant Dick Laird killed an American runner on Attu during a Japanese banzai charge.
- 16–17 May – Operation Chastise: Nineteen RAF Lancaster bombers of No. 617 Squadron were dispatched to attack dams in Eder, Möhne and Sorpe (Röhr) rivers near Germany, using a specially developed "bouncing bomb" invented and developed by Barnes Wallis. Möhne and Edersee Dams were breached, causing catastrophic flooding of the Ruhr valley and of villages in the Eder valley. According to German historian Ralf Blank, at least 1,650 people were killed. Of the bodies found downriver of the Möhne Dam, 1,026 were foreign prisoners of war and forced labourers in different camps, mainly from the Soviet Union. At the city of Neheim (now part of Neheim-Hüsten) at the confluence of the Möhne and Ruhr rivers, over 800 people perished, among them at least 493 female forced labourers from the Soviet Union. Some non-German sources cite an earlier total of 749 for all foreigners in all camps in the Möhne and Ruhr valleys as the casualty count at a camp just below the Eder Dam.)
- 17 May – A U.S. Navy PBY Catalina flying boat dropped two depth charges on the U.S. Navy submarine USS S-33 (SS-138) at Longitude 165 degrees East while S-33 was on patrol off the Kuril Islands. S-33 reported the attack as occurring 30 nautical miles (56 km; 35 mi) east of the position the PBY reported and that she suffered no damage or casualties.
- 19 May – The Royal Navy destroyer HMS Wishart mistook the Free French Naval Forces submarine La Vestale for a German U-boat in darkness in the Mediterranean Sea off the coast of Algeria and attacked her. La Vestale sustained massive damage to her stern and suffered one killed and several wounded. She was towed into port and repaired.
- 22 May – A PBY Catalina flying boat of U.S. Navy Patrol Squadron 101 (VP-101) mistakenly dropped a depth charge on the U.S. Navy submarine USS Grayling (SS-209) as Grayling submerged in the Indian Ocean at 17°S 115°E. The depth charge did not explode.
- 5 June – Friendly forces machine-gunned the U.S. Navy submarine USS Lapon (SS-260) at New London Sanctuary, Connecticut.
- 31 May – The U.S. Navy submarine USS S-34 (SS-139) mistakenly sank the Soviet survey ship Chukcha off Torishimo Retto.
- 27 June – An Allied aircraft the submarine USS Growler (SS-215) identified as a U.S. Army Air Forces B-26 Marauder bomber attacked Growler, reporting her as a Japanese submarine. The plane's bombs landed several miles from Growler, and she submerged.
- 29 June – United States Army Coast Artillery Corps guns at Fort Zachary Taylor opened fire on the U.S. Navy submarine USS R-14 (SS-91) while R-14 was off Key West. Florida. R-14 suffered no damage.
- July – During Operation Husky, Lieutenant General Omar Bradley, commander of the U.S. II Corps, recalled that his column was attacked by American A-36 ground-attack aircraft in Sicily. The tanks lit yellow smoke flares to identify themselves to their own aircraft but the attacks continued, forcing the column to return fire which resulted in the downing of one aircraft. A parachuting pilot from the downed A-36 was brought before Bradley. 'You stupid sonofabitch!!' Bradley fumed. 'Didn't you see our yellow recognition signals!?' The pilot replied 'Oh, is that what that was?'.
- 9 July – The U.S. Navy submarine USS Permit (SS-178) mistakenly sank the Soviet oceanographic research ship Seiner No. 20 with gunfire 27 nautical miles (50 km; 31 mi) off Kaiba To and 14 to 15 nautical miles (26 to 28 km; 16 to 17 mi) west of Todosima Island, killing two people. Permit rescued Seiner No. 20's 12 survivors, seven men and five women.
- 11 July – During Operation Husky, codename for the Allied invasion of Sicily, on the night of 11 July 1943, American paratroopers of the 504th Parachute Infantry Regiment, together with the 376th Parachute Field Artillery Battalion and Company 'C' of the 307th Airborne Engineer Battalion (making a total of some 1,900 parachutists), part of the U.S. 82nd Airborne Division, traveling in 144 C-47 transport planes, passed over Allied lines shortly after a German air raid, and were mistakenly fired upon by American ground and naval forces. 23 planes were shot down and 37 damaged, resulting in 318 casualties, with 60 airmen and 81 paratroopers killed.
- 29 July – A Royal Australian Air Force Catalina flying boat patrol bomber attacked the U.S. Navy submarine USS Tuna (SS-203) in the Solomon Sea 80 nautical miles (150 km; 92 mi) east-northeast of Kiriwina Island and north of Woodlark Island at 08°02′N 152°07′E, dropping four depth charges. After Tuna crash-dived, the depth charges exploded close aboard as she passed a depth between 70 feet (21 m) and 110 feet (34 m), and she plunged to a depth of 365 feet (111 m) before her crew regained control of her. She surfaced with a port list of 18 degrees. The damage she sustained necessitated 17 days of major repairs.
- 30 July – A U.S. Army Air Forces B-25 Mitchell bomber mistakenly attacked the U.S. Navy submarine USS Grouper (SS-214) in the Coral Sea, 185 nautical miles (343 km; 213 mi) east of Rossel Island at 11°00′S 156°44′E. Grouper crash-dived to a depth of 150 feet (46 m), but the B-25 dropped two depth charges which exploded as she passed a depth of 50 feet (15 m), inflicting enough damage that Grouper was forced to terminate her patrol.
- 12 August – RAF Flight Sergeant Arthur Louis Aaron was fatally wounded when the Short Stirling bomber he piloted during an air raid on Turin was reportedly (according to his posthumous Victoria Cross citation) hit by machine gun fire from an enemy night fighter, which killed his navigator and wounded other crew members, although it is believed it may have been friendly fire from another Stirling. He died, after successfully landing the plane in Algeria, nine hours later.
- 13 August – An Allied tanker opened gunfire on the U.S. Navy submarine USS Porpoise (SS-172) in the Pacific Ocean a day after Porpoise departed Pearl Harbor, Hawaii, bound for New London, Connecticut. Porpoise maneuvered away on the surface and suffered no damage.
- 17–18 August – Local German anti-aircraft batteries were ordered to fire on 200 Luftwaffe planes observed flying over Berlin during the night which had been mistaken for British bombers that had become detached from the concurrent major air raid on Peenemunde (Operation Hydra). The responsible Luftwaffe general, Hans Jeschonnek, subsequently committed suicide after the error was revealed.
- August – During Operation Cottage, after Allied forces occupied Kiska Island, U.S. and Canadian forces mistook each other for Japanese and engaged each other in a deadly firefight. As a result, 28 Americans and four Canadians were killed, with 50 more wounded. There were no Japanese troops on the island two weeks before U.S. and Canadian forces landed. Meanwhile, thinking they were engaging Americans, Imperial Japanese Navy warships shelled and attempted to torpedo neighbouring Little Kiska Island where Japanese soldiers were waiting to embark.
- 30 August – The American Type C1-B cargo ship SS Alcoa Patriot opened gunfire on the U.S. Navy submarine USS Cod (SS-224) in the Caribbean Sea at 12°25′N 076°03′W, about 120 nautical miles (220 km; 140 mi) north-northwest of Barranquilla, Colombia, and 330 nautical miles (610 km; 380 mi) east of the northern entrance to the Panama Canal. Less than three hours later, Alcoa Patriot again sighted Cod and fired on her at 12°02′N 076°04′W, about 105 nautical miles (194 km; 121 mi) northwest of Barranquilla and 310 nautical miles (570 km; 360 mi) east of the northern entrance to the Panama Canal. Cod suffered no damage in either incident.
- 31 August – A U.S. Army Air Forces B-24 Liberator bomber attacked the U.S. Navy submarine USS Stingray (SS186) as she crash-dived in the Solomon Sea 30 nautical miles (56 km; 35 mi) west of Buka Island at 05°24′S 154°07′E, dropping three 500-pound (227 kg) bombs which missed her by 50 feet (15 m). Stingray suffered significant damage but no casualties.
- 8 September – A Royal Australian Air Force Catalina flying boat strafed the U.S. Navy submarine USS Bluefish (SS-222) in the Timor Sea north of Melville Island.
- 9 September – An Allied maritime patrol aircraft attacked the U.S. Navy submarine USS Peto (SS-265) with a depth charge in the Pacific Ocean 310 nautical miles (570 km; 360 mi) north-northeast of Buka on Bougainville Island in the Solomon Islands at 03°49′S 158°26′E. The depth charge missed by a wide margin, and Peto submerged to 200 feet (61 m) and avoided damage.
- 16 September – After the U.S. Navy submarine USS Pompon (SS-267) sighted an Allied Liberty ship in the Coral Sea 25 nautical miles (46 km; 29 mi) east of Grafton Passage in the Great Barrier Reef at 16°35′S 146°45′E at 04:05, the ship altered course directly toward Pompon. Pompon submerged. After Pompon returned to the surface, she unsuccessfully attempted to exchange recognition signals with the ship, which opened gunfire on her at a range of 12,000 yards (11,000 m) at 06:14. Pompon submerged again and suffered no damage.
- 10 October – While the Free French Naval Forces submarine Minerve was on the surface in the Western Approaches about 300 nautical miles (560 km; 350 mi) west of Brest, France, performing repairs on a diesel engine, a Royal Air Force Coastal Command Liberator patrol aircraft mistook her for a German U-boat and attacked her with rockets, killing two members of her crew, wounding two others, and badly damaging her hull.
- Late October – A U.S. Navy patrol bomber dropped a string of bombs on the U.S. Navy submarine USS Batfish (SS-310) in the Caribbean Sea northeast of the Panama Canal but did not damage her.
- 8 November – A United States Army Air Forces Fifth Air Force plane bombed and strafed the U.S. Navy submarine USS Albacore (SS-218) 130 nautical miles (241 km; 150 mi) north-northwest of Mussau Island at 00°17′N 149°00′E. Four bombs landed close alongside Albacore as she submerged to escape the attack.
- 10 November – A United States Army Air Forces Fifth Air Force four-engine bomber dropped a string of bombs which straddled the U.S. Navy submarine USS Albacore (SS-218) in the northeastern portion of the St. George's Channel 55 nautical miles (102 km; 63 mi) southwest of Kavieng, New Ireland at 03°08′N 150°17′E. Albacore suffered damage which caused her to plunge to a depth of 450 feet (137 m) before her crew regained control of her.
- 14 November – The destroyer USS William D. Porter (DD-579) accidentally fired a torpedo at the battleship USS Iowa (BB-61) in the Atlantic Ocean while Iowa was transporting President Franklin D. Roosevelt to North Africa on his way to the Cairo Conference and the Tehran Conference. Iowa took evasive action, and the torpedo exploded in her wake 3,000 yards (2,700 m) astern of her.
- 15 November – An Allied tanker opened gunfire on the U.S. Navy submarine USS Batfish (SS-310) in the Pacific Ocean between the Panama Canal and Pearl Harbor, Hawaii. Batfish submerged and avoided damage.
- 19 November – The U.S. Navy destroyer USS Ringgold (DD-500) opened gunfire on the submarine USS Nautilus (SS-168) while Nautilus was off Maiana in the Gilbert Islands at 01°05′N 173°03′E, hitting Nautilus at the base of the conning tower with one 5-inch (127 mm) round which did not explode. Nautilus submerged and avoided further damage, suffering no casualties, but reached 310 feet (94 m) before her crew gained control of her.
- 20 November – An Allied patrol bomber dropped a depth charge on the U.S. Navy submarine USS Rasher (SS-269) while Rasher was at a depth of 47 feet (14 m) in the Indian Ocean 310 nautical miles (574 km; 357 mi) north-northeast of Exmouth Gulf in Western Australia at 17°44′S 115°39′E. Rasher sustained no damage.
- 23 November – After the U.S. Navy destroyers USS Meade (DD-602) and USS Frazier (DD-607) sank the Japanese submarine I-35 9 nautical miles (17 km; 10 mi) west of Betio in Tarawa Atoll in the Gilbert Islands at 01°22′N 172°47′E and launched boats to recover I-35′s survivors, a U.S. Navy SBD Dauntless dive bomber from the escort aircraft carrier USS Suwannee (CVE-27) mistook Meade′s boat for a Japanese submarine and attacked it with a 500-pound (227 kg) bomb. The explosion lifted the boat out of the water and badly damaged it but inflicted no serious injuries on its occupants. Uncertain of the dive bomber′s identity, Meade opened gunfire on it, damaging it and driving it off. The boat reached Meade without further incident, and the Dauntless landed aboard Suwannee with its crew unharmed.
- December – An Allied merchant ship opened gunfire on the U.S. Navy submarine USS Flier (SS-250) on an unrecorded date in December 1943 sometime prior to 20 December, firing 13 rounds before Flier escaped undamaged into a rain squall.

=== 1944 ===
- 1 January – An Allied tanker opened fire on the U.S. Navy submarine USS Jack (SS-259) in the Pacific Ocean northeast of Hawaii at 23°20′N 154°30′W.
- 28 January

- A train carrying 800 Allied prisoners of war was bombed when it crossed a bridge on the Ponte Paglia in Allerona, Italy, approximately 400 British, U.S. and South African prisoners being killed. In anticipation of the Allied advance, the POWs had been evacuated from PG Campo 54 at Fara-in-Sabina outside of Rome, and were being transported to Germany in unmarked cattle cars. The prisoners of war had been padlocked in the cars and were crossing the bridge when B-26s of the 320th Bombardment Group arrived to blow up the bridge. The driver stopped the train on the span, leaving the prisoners locked inside to their fate. While many escaped, approximately 400 were killed, according to local records, and witness testimony. The mass graves were later destroyed by subsequent bombardments.
- Early in the morning a U.S. Navy PT boat carrying U.S. Fifth Army commander General Mark Clark to the Anzio beachhead, six days after the Anzio landings, was mistakenly fired on by sister U.S. naval vessels. Several sailors were killed and wounded around him.

- 13 February – Four U.S. Navy planes attacked the U.S. Navy submarine USS Searaven (SS-196) while she was on the surface in the Pacific Ocean near Engebi Island in Eniwetok Atoll. Believing that they were Japanese planes, Searaven crash-dived, and her crew heard four depth charges detonate by the time she passed a depth of 80 feet (24 m). She suffered no damage or casualties.
- 15 February – During the Battle of Monte Cassino the USAAF, under orders from the Allied commander-in-chief, General Sir Harold Alexander via General Mark Clark, bombed the hilltop Cassino abbey which was suspected to be used as a German observation post. It killed 230 Italian civilians, whose country by then was 'co-belligerent' with the Allies, who had sought shelter in the monastery but no Germans (whose troops subsequently occupied and made the evacuated ruins a stronghold). Bombs that fell short of site killed some Allied troops on ground below, while 16 bombs were mistakenly dropped at the Fifth Army headquarter compound 17 miles (27 km) away, exploding yards from General Clark's trailer while he was at his desk inside.
- 17 February – As a U.S. Navy task force of battleships and destroyers passed over the U.S. Navy submarine USS Searaven (SS-196) while she was at a depth of 200 feet (61 m), one of the destroyers dropped a depth charge targeting her. She suffered no damage or casualties.
- 3 March – The U.S. Navy submarine USS Sand Lance (SS-381) mistakenly sank the Soviet merchant ship Byelorussia in the Sea of Okhotsk.
- 25 March – A USAAF C-54 flying from the Azores to the United Kingdom was misidentified as a Focke-Wulf Fw 200 Condor and shot down by a Fleet Air Arm Grumman F4F Wildcat fighter. All six crew were killed.
- 27 March – During the morning, two U.S. Navy motor torpedo boats (PT-121 and PT-353) were destroyed in error by Royal Australian Air Force (RAAF) P-40 Kittyhawks of No. 78 Squadron, along with an RAAF Bristol Beaufighter of No. 30 Squadron. A second Beaufighter crew recognized the vessels as PT boats and tried to stop the attack, but not before both boats exploded and sank off the coast of New Britain. Eight American sailors were killed, with 12 others wounded. Survivors were rescued by PT-346, which herself became a friendly fire victim in April 1944.
- 29 March – A U.S. Army Air Forces Fifth Air Force B-24 Liberator bomber attacked the U.S. Navy submarine USS Gunnel (SS-253) off Australia, dropping a bomb as she crash-dived. Gunnel suffered no casualties or damage.
- 30 March – While the U.S. Navy submarine USS Tunny (SS-282) was in the vicinity of Toagel Mulungui Passage performing lifeguard duty in support of United States Fifth Fleet airstrikes on the Palau Islands, two TBF Avenger torpedo bombers of U.S. Navy Torpedo Squadron 5 (VT-5) from the aircraft carrier USS Yorktown (CV-10) mistook her for a Japanese destroyer and dropped two 2,000-pound (907 kg) bombs, one of which landed 10 yards (9 m) from Tunny. Tunny suffered minor damage.
- 11 April – A U.S. Army Air Forces B-24 Liberator bomber strafed and bombed the U.S. Navy submarine USS Cero (SS-225) as she submerged in the western Pacific Ocean about 300 nautical miles (560 km; 350 mi) east-northeast of Biak Island. Cero suffered no damage.
- 13 April – A U.S. Navy PB4Y-1 Liberator patrol bomber bombed the U.S. Navy submarine USS Bashaw (SS-241) in the Pacific Ocean 415 nautical miles (769 km; 478 mi) west-southwest of Truk Atoll at 04°30′N 147°26′E. Bashaw submerged and avoided damage.
- 24 April – An Allied two-engine bomber strafed the U.S. Navy submarine USS Billfish (SS-286) as Billfish submerged in the Timor Sea west of Port Darwin, Australia.
- 29 April
  - The U.S. Navy patrol torpedo boat PT-346, which had rescued the survivors of PT-121 and PT-353 after a friendly-fire incident on 27 March, herself became the victim of friendly fire, when sent to the aid of the PT boat PT-347, which had become stuck on a reef during a night patrol to intercept Japanese barges and destroy Japanese shore installations off the coast of Rabaul in Lassul Bay, located off the northwest corner of New Britain Island. At 0700, PT-350 was attempting to dislodge PT-347 from the reef, when two American Marine Corsair planes mistook the PT boats for Japanese gunboats and attacked. Taking heavy fire from the planes, PT-350 shot down one of the two attacking fighters, believing them to be A6M Zeros. With three dead and four wounded and serious mechanical problems, PT-350 headed back to base. PT-347 remained stuck on the reef. When PT-350 could not be boarded because of extensive damage, PT-346 headed out to PT-347 to provide assistance. PT-346 arrived at 1230, and at 1400 was still attempting to dislodge PT-347 from the coral heads when planes appeared. The Corsair plane from the morning run brought back an entire squadron of 21 planes (four Corsairs, six Grumman TBF Avenger torpedo bombers, four Grumman F6F Hellcat fighters, and eight Douglas SBD Dauntless dive bombers). Recognizing the planes as American and thinking they were the air cover he had ordered, the squadron commander ordered the men to keep working; however, the planes attacked the two boats, still mistaking them for Japanese gunboats. PT-346 did not respond defensively until it was too late, and took heavy casualties. The skipper of PT-347, Lieutenant Williams, who had experienced the earlier attack, ordered his men into the water and to stay dispersed, but two men were killed and three wounded. PT-346 and PT-347 were completely destroyed by bombs, and the men were strafed in the water for approximately one hour.
  - A U.S. Navy PB4Y-1 Liberator patrol bomber of Bombing Squadron 109 (VB-109) mistook the U.S. Navy submarine USS Seahorse (SS-304) for a Japanese submarine and attacked her off Satawan southeast of Truk Atoll while she was performing lifeguard duty in support of U.S. airstrikes. The PB4Y-1 dropped two bombs as Seahorse crash-dived. Seahorse suffered a damaged antenna, but no other damage and no casualties.
- 12 May
  - An Allied Liberty ship opened gunfire at a range of 12,000 yards (11,000 m) on the U.S. Navy submarine USS Bream (SS-243) in the Coral Sea at 18°31′S 153°13′E, firing five or six rounds. Bream suffered no damage.
  - Three British aircraft mistook the Free French Naval Forces submarine Archimède for a German U-boat and attacked her in the Mediterranean Sea. She avoided damage by diving to a depth of 40 metres (131 ft).
- 15 May – An Allied aircraft bombed and strafed the Free French Naval Forces submarine La Sultane in the Mediterranean Sea, either ignoring or failing to recognize La Sultane′s recognition signals.
- 27 May – The U.S. Navy submarine USS Lapon (SS-260) hit the submarine USS Raton (SS-270) — which she had mistaken for an Imperial Japanese Navy submarine — with two torpedoes in the South China Sea near Dangerous Ground at 07°46′N 108°33′E, denting Raton′s hull. Raton survived, suffering no casualties and no other damage. It is the only confirmed instance of one U.S. submarine firing at another during World War II.
- 28 May – A PV-1 Ventura of U.S. Navy Bombing Squadron 148 (VB-148) damaged the submarine USS Permit (SS-178) with a depth charge in the Pacific Ocean in the vicinity of 06°45′N 151°52′E. Permit suffered no casualties.
- 5–6 June – Several RAF Avro Lancasters attempting to bomb the German artillery battery at Merville-Franceville-Plage attacked instead friendly positions, killing 186 soldiers of the British Reconnaissance Corps and devastating the town. They also mistakenly bombed Drop Zone 'V ' of the 6th Airborne Division, killing 78 and injuring 65.
- 6 June – RAF fighters bombed and strafed the HQ entourage of 3rd Parachute Brigade (British 6th Airborne Division) near Pegasus Bridge after mistaking them for a German column. At least 15 men were killed and many others were wounded.
- 8 June – a group of RAF Hawker Typhoons attacked the 175th Infantry Regiment, 29th U.S. Infantry Division on the Isigny Highway, France, causing 24 casualties.
- 16 June – After sighting the Imperial Japanese Navy submarine I-6 surfacing nearby and mistaking her for an Allied submarine, the Japanese armed cargo ship Toyokawa Maru rammed and sank I-6 in the Pacific Ocean near Yokosuka, Japan. I-6 was lost with all hands. (Alternative accounts have Toyokawa Maru sinking I-6 off Saipan on 30 June 1944 and the U.S. Navy destroyer escort USS William C. Miller (DE-259) and high-speed transport USS Gilmer (APD-11) sinking I-6 70 nautical miles (130 km; 81 mi) west of Tinian at 15°18′N 144°26′E on 19 July 1944.)
- 18 June – The 5,433-gross register ton Panamanian merchant ship SS White Clover fired six rounds at the U.S. Navy submarine USS Hawkbill (SS-366) in the Caribbean Sea about 20 nautical miles (37 km; 23 mi) south of Cape San Antonio, Cuba, at 21°31′N 085°04′W. Hawkbill suffered no damage.
- 24 June - The 6,780 ton Japanese passenger-cargo ship Tamahoko Maru was torpedoed and sunk by the U.S. Navy submarine USS Tang (SS-306) in the Koshiki Straits 40 miles SW of Nagasaki resulting in the loss of 560 of the 772 Allied POWs on board.
- June – During Operation Cobra, the American offensive push south from western Normandy, bombs from the U.S. Army Air Forces Eighth Air Force landed on American troops on two separate occasions.
- 6 July – The U.S. Navy submarine USS Sunfish (SS-281) mistakenly sank the Soviet ship Ob in the Sea of Okhotsk.
- 8 July – A Fairey Swordfish aircraft from the British Merchant Aircraft Carrier Empire MacCallum sank the Free French Naval Forces submarine Perle in the North Atlantic Ocean at 55°27′N 30°50′W after the Swordfish crew mistook her for a German U-boat. Only one member of her crew of 42 survived. Her 41 lost crewmen were the last casualties the French submarine forces suffered during World War II.
- 24 July – Some 1,600 bombers flew in support of the opening bombardment for Cobra. Due to bad weather they were unable to see their targets. Although some were recalled, and others declined to bomb without visibility, a number did, which hit U.S. positions. Twenty-five were killed and 131 wounded in this incident.
- The following day, on 25 July, the operation was repeated by 1,800 bombers of the Eighth Air Force. On this occasion, the weather was clear, but despite requests by First Army commander General Omar Bradley to bomb east to west, along the front in order to avoid creepback, the air commanders made their attack north to south, over Allied lines. As more and more bombs fell short, and U.S. positions again were hit, 111 were killed and 490 wounded. Lieutenant General Lesley McNair was among the dead, the highest-ranking victim of American friendly fire.
- 26 July – USAAF P-47s mistakenly strafed the US 644th Tank Destroyer Battalion near Perrières, France. 20 men were badly injured, but there were no fatalities.
- 27 July – The former HMS Sunfish was sunk by a British RAF Coastal Command aircraft in the Norwegian Sea during the beginning of its process of being transferred to the Soviet Navy. The Captain, Israel Fisanovich, supposedly had taken her out of her assigned area and was diving the sub when the aircraft came in sight instead of staying on the surface and firing signal flares as instructed. All crew, including the British liaison staff, were lost. Later investigation revealed that the RAF crew were at fault.
- 4 August – The crew of a de Havilland Mosquito from 410 Tactical Fighter Operational Training Squadron, RCAF, mistook a Westland Lysander for a Henschel Hs 126 during a night interception, shooting it down.
- 7 August – A RAF Hawker Typhoon strafed a squad from 'F' Company/US 120th Infantry Regiment, near Hill 314, France, killing two men. Around noon on the same day, RAF Hawker Typhoon of the 2TAF was called in to assist the US 823rd Tank Destroyer Battalion in stopping an attack by the 2nd SS Panzer Division between Sourdeval and Mortain but instead fired its rockets at two US 3-inch guns near L'Abbaye Blanche, killing one man and wounding several others even after the yellow smoke (which was to identify friendlies) was put out. Two hours later, an RAF Typhoon shot up the Service Company of the 120th Infantry Regiment, US 30th Division, causing several casualties, including Major James Bynum who was killed near Mortain. The officer who replaced him was strafed by another Typhoon a few minutes later and seriously wounded. Around the same time, a Hawker Typhoon attacked the Cannon Company of 120th Infantry Regiment, US 30th Division, near Mortain, killing 15 men. An hour later, RAF Typhoons strafed 'B' Company/US 120th Infantry Regiment on Hill 285, killing a driver of a weapons carrier.
- Two battalions of the 77th Infantry on Guam exchanged prolonged fire on 8 August 1944, the incident possibly started with the firing of mortars for range-finding and angle calibration purposes. Small arms and then armour fire was exchanged. The mistake was realized when both units tried to call in the same artillery battalion to bombard the other.
- 8 August –
  - 8th USAAF heavy bombers bombed the headquarters of the 3rd Canadian Infantry Division and 1st Polish Armoured Division during Operation Totalize, killing 65 and wounding 250 Allied soldiers.
  - Near Mortain, France, RAF Hawker Typhoon aircraft attacked two Sherman tanks of 'C' Company, US 743rd Tank Battalion with rockets, killing five tank crewmen and wounding ten soldiers. Later that day, two Shermans from 'A' Company, US 743rd Tank Battalion were destroyed and set ablaze by RAF Typhoons near Mortain. One tank crewman was killed and 12 others wounded.
- 9 August – A RAF Hawker Typhoon strafed units of the British Columbia Regiment and the Algonquin Regiment, 4th Canadian Armoured Division, near Quesnay Wood during Operation Totalize, causing several casualties. Later that day, the same units were mistakenly fired upon by tanks and artillery of the 1st Polish Armoured Division, resulting in more casualties.
- 12 August – RAF Hawker Typhoons fired rockets at Sherman tanks of 'A' Company, US 743rd Tank Battalion, near Mortain, France, causing damage to one tank and badly injuring two tank crewmen.
- 13 August – 12 British soldiers of 'B' Company, 4th Wiltshires, 43rd Wessex Division, were killed and 25 others wounded when they were hit by rockets and machine gun attacks by RAF Typhoons near La Villette, Calvados, France.
- 14 August – RAF heavy bombers hit Allied troops in error during Operation Tractable causing about 490 casualties including 112 dead. The bombings also destroyed 265 Allied vehicles, 30 field guns and two tanks. British anti-aircraft guns opened fire on the RAF bombers and some may have been hit.
- 16 August 1944 – A U.S. Navy TBM Avenger torpedo bomber from the escort carrier USS White Plains (CVE-66) mistook the U.S. Navy submarine USS S-38 (SS-143) for a Japanese submarine about 12 nautical miles (22 km; 14 mi) ahead of the White Plains task unit while S-38 was conducting antisubmarine warfare exercises in the Pacific Ocean near Espiritu Santo with two SBD Dauntless dive bombers and the yard patrol boat USS YP-414. The TBM dropped two 300-pound (136 kg) depth charges as S-38 crash-dived. The first depth charge detonated close aboard as S-38 passed 38 feet (12 m), causing S-38 to lose all power temporarily. S-38 claimed that the second exploded as she resurfaced, while the TBM pilot reported that it did not detonate.
- 17 August – RAF fighters attacked the soldiers of the British 7th Armoured Division, resulting in 20 casualties, including the intelligence officer of 8th Hussars who was badly injured. The colonel riding along was badly shaken when their jeep crashed off the road.
- 14–18 August – The South Alberta Regiment of the 4th Canadian Armoured Division came under fire six times by RAF Spitfires, resulting in over 57 casualties. Many vehicles were also set on fire and the yellow smoke used for signalling friendlies was ignored by Spitfire pilots. An officer of the South Alberta demanded that he wanted his Crusader AA tanks to shoot at the Spitfires attacking his Headquarters.
- 27 August
  - A United States Army Air Forces B-24 Liberator bomber strafed the U.S. Navy submarine USS Pollack (SS-180) with machine-gun fire in the Pacific Ocean off Yap in the Caroline Islands in the vicinity of 09°47′30″N 138°38′18″E. Pollack suffered no damage or casuatties.
  - A minesweeping flotilla of Royal Navy ships came under fire near Le Havre. At about noon on 27 August, HMS Britomart, Salamander, Hussar and Jason came under rocket and cannon attacks by Hawker Typhoon aircraft of No. 263 Squadron RAF and No. 266 Squadron RAF. HMS Britomart and HMS Hussar took direct hits and were sunk. HMS Salamander had her stern blown off and sustained heavy damage. HMS Jason was raked by machine gun fire, killing and wounding several of her crew. Two of the accompanying trawlers were also hit. The total loss of life was 117 sailors killed and 153 wounded. The attack had continued despite the attempts by the ships to signal that they were friendly and radio requests by the commander of the aircraft for clarification of his target. In the aftermath the surviving sailors were told to keep quiet about the attack. The subsequent court of enquiry identified the fault as lying with the Navy, which had requested the attack on what they thought were enemy vessels entering or leaving Le Havre, and three RN officers were put before a court martial. The commander of Jason and his crew were decorated for their part in rescuing their comrades. At the time reporting of the incident was suppressed, with information not fully released until 1994.
- 8–9 September – At about midnight on the night of 8–9 September, the Japanese cargo ship Izu Maru rammed the Imperial Japanese Army Type 3 submergence transport vehicle Yu 3001 — a transport submarine — in the Yellow Sea near Kunsan, Korea, after mistaking her for an enemy submarine. The collision ripped a large hole in Yu 3001′s pressure hull and injured one officer on board. Yu 3001 remained afloat. In a second incident later in Yu 3001′s voyage as she headed to port for repairs, an Imperial Japanese Navy ship escorting a passing convoy fired two rounds at her without damaging her.
- 9 September – On the third day of the Battle of Arnhem, a German SS battalion's pursuit of landed Allied paratroopers was halted at the village of Wolfheze, Netherlands, when Luftwaffe planes mistakenly strafed it.
- 12 September:

- A group of RAF Hawker Typhoon aircraft destroyed two Sherman tanks of the Governor General's Foot Guards, 4th Canadian Armoured Division in the vicinity of Maldegem, Belgium, killing three men and injuring four. One Canadian soldier from the 4th Canadian Armored Division wounded recalled this incident saying "... while so deployed the tanks were suddenly attacked, in mistake, by several Typhoon aircraft. Lt. Middleton-Hope's tank was badly hit, killing the gunner Guardsman Hughes, and the tank was set on fire. Almost immediately Sgt. Jenning's tank was similarly knocked out by Typhoon rockets. Meanwhile the Typhoons continued to press home their attack with machine guns and rockets, and, while trying to extricate the gunner, Lt. Middleton-Hope was killed after his tank was blown off. In this tragic encounter, Guardsman Scott was also killed and Baker, Barter, and Cheal were seriously wounded."
- The Japanese transport ship Rakuyō Maru, carrying 1,317 Australian and British prisoners-of-war in convoy from Singapore to Formosa (Taiwan), was sunk in the Luzon Strait by the submarine USS Sealion, whose commanders were unaware until after the sinking that allied prisoners had been on board. Ultimately 1,159 POWs died, only 50 rescued by the Sealion and sister submarines in her pack lived to make landfall.
- Kachidoki Maru, carrying some 950 Australian and British prisoners-of-war, was travelling in the same convoy when it was sunk by the submarine USS Pampanito. 431 prisoners were killed; the remainder were rescued by Japanese destroyers and taken to Japan.

- 13 September The U.S. Navy submarine USS Segundo (SS-398) was in the Philippine Sea 165 nautical miles (306 km; 190 mi) east of Catanduanes Island at 13°32′N 126°55′E when two U.S. Navy planes mistook her for a Japanese submarine and strafed her as she crash-dived. No rounds struck her.
- 18 September – The Japanese cargo ship Junyō Maru was packed with 1,377 Dutch, 64 British and Australian, and 8 American prisoners of war along with 4,200 Javanese slave labourers (Romushas) bound for work on a railway line being built in Sumatra when she was attacked and sunk by British submarine HMS Tradewind, whose commander, Lt. Cdr Lynch Maydon, did not know there were Allied prisoners of war on board. At that time it was the world's greatest sea disaster with 5,620 dead as well as the worst single friendly fire loss (surpassed by the Cap Arcona disaster next year) and highest death toll inflicted in a single action by British forces. 680 survivors were rescued, the prisoners of whom went on to their intended destination.
- 19 September – RAF Sergeant Bernard McCormack, a gunner in a Lancaster bomber, was returning along with other RAF aircrews from a night time raid over Nazi Germany. As they returned to RAF Woodhall Spa in Lincolnshire, Sgt McCormack saw a plane flying in the same formation as he was. Believing that it was a German Junkers Ju 88, he attacked the plane, bringing it down over the Dutch town of Steenbergen. Two of the occupants were killed. It was found out by RAF intelligence officers that it was actually a British Mosquito flown by CO Guy Gibson, who previously took part in Operation Chastise, and his navigator Jim Warwick. Wracked with guilt, McCormack taped a confession, which he entrusted to his wife Eunice when he died in 1992.
- 3 October – A U.S. Navy TBF Avenger torpedo bomber from the escort carrier USS Midway (CVE-63) attacked the U.S. Navy submarine USS Stingray (SS-186) as she crash-dived in the Pacific Ocean 100 nautical miles (185 km; 115 mi) east-northeast of Morotai at 02°45′S 129°52′E. The TBF crashed during the attack, apparently as Stingray passed a depth of 110 feet (34 m), killing the pilot.
- 4 October – A U.S. Navy PB4Y-1 Liberator patrol bomber attacked the submarine USS Mingo (SS-261) while Mingo was performing lifeguard duty in support of United States Army Air Forces Thirteenth Air Force strikes on the Philippines and Borneo. The Liberator dropped a 100-pound (45 kg) bomb which landed 100 yards (91 m) from Mingo, inflicting no damage or casualties.
- 9 October – The U.S. Navy destroyer USS Cogswell (DD-651) depth-charged the U.S. Navy submarine USS Flying Fish (SS-229) in the Pacific Ocean after Flying Fish submerged as she approached and did not respond to sonar recognition signals. Cogswell halted her attack after Flying Fish responded to the recognition signals. Flying Fish suffered no damage.
- 24 October – the Japanese transport Arisan Maru was carrying 1,784 Allied prisoners of war (POWs) from Manila to Manchuria when it was sunk by a torpedo from USS Shark. All but nine of the POWs are reported to have died in the incident mainly through the Japanese escort ships not rescuing them when they had all evacuated ship.
- 25 October – The Imperial Japanese Navy battleship Fusō mistakenly opened gunfire on the Japanese heavy cruiser Mogami in Surigao Strait in the Philippine Islands, killing three men in Mogami′s sick bay.
- In October, Soviet troops liberated the city of Niš from occupying German forces and advanced on Belgrade. At the same time, the U.S. Army Air Forces was bombing German-Albanian units entering from Kosovo. The U.S. planes mistook the advancing Soviet tanks as enemies (probably due to a lack of communications) and began attacking them, whereupon the Soviets then called in for air support from Niš airport and a five-minute dogfight ensued, ending after both the U.S. and Soviet commanders ordered the planes to retreat.
- Late October – The United States Navy Armed Guard detachment aboard an American Liberty ship opened fire with a 5-inch (127 mm) gun on the U.S. Navy submarine USS Crevalle (SS-291) in the Bass Strait south of Melbourne, Australia. Crevalle suffered no damage.
- 7 November - Niš incident: US P-38 straffed a USSR vehicle column and then engaged in a dogfight with USSR Planes: Over 30 USSR casualties including Red Army general Grigory Kotov; 3 USSR Planes. three US planes were lost (2 killed in action and 1 survived)
- 27 November – An Allied PBY Catalina mistook the U.S. Navy submarine USS Gar (SS-206) for a Japanese submarine and attacked her in the Celebes Sea 20 nautical miles (37 km; 23 mi) southeast of the Sibutu Passage at 04°33′N 119°50′E. Gar crash-dived to a depth of 150 feet (46 m) and heard three bombs explode, none of them close.
- 28 November – The U.S. Navy submarine USS Spearfish (SS-190) was on the surface 23 nautical miles (43 km; 26 mi) east-southeast of Iwo Jima at 24°40′N 141°39′E when a U.S. Army Air Forces B-24 Liberator bomber attacked her with rockets and strafed her. Her officer of the deck observed a large explosion plume 700 yards (640 m) from Spearfish just before she submerged.
- December – Canadian artillery units were rushed in to support the retreating American forces as a counterattack against the advancing German Army during the early stages of the Ardennes Offensive. When American troops were making a retreat north of the Ardennes, the Canadians mistook them for a German column. The Canadian artillery guns opened fire on them, resulting in 76 American deaths and many as 138 wounded.
- 24 December - Royal Air Force mistakenly strafed an unmarked train on a railway that was carrying into Germany American prisoners-of-war captured in the Battle of The Bulge, killing about 150 of them, according to one survivor, Kurt Vonnegut.
- 25 December – Major George E. Preddy, commander of the USAAF 328th Fighter Squadron, was the highest-scoring U.S. ace still in combat in the European Theater at the time when he died on Christmas Day near Liege in Belgium. Preddy was chasing a German fighter over an American anti-aircraft battery and was hit by their fire aimed at his intended target.
- Operation Wintergewitter (Winter Storm) – Italian Front: American forward observer John R. Fox called down fire on his own position to stop a German advance on the town of Sommocolonia, Italy. In 1997 he was posthumously awarded the Medal of Honor for this action.

=== 1945 ===
- 1 January – Operation Bodenplatte (Baseplate): 900 German fighters and fighter-bombers launched a surprise attack on Allied airfields. Approximately 300 aircraft were lost, 237 pilots killed, missing, or captured, and 18 pilots wounded – the largest single-day loss for the Luftwaffe. Many losses were due to fire from Luftwaffe anti-aircraft batteries, whose crew members had not been informed of the attack.
- 6 January – Two United States Marine Corps SBD Dauntless dive bombers of Marine Scouting Squadron 245 (VMSB-245) bombed the U.S. Navy submarine USS Spadefish (SS-411) in the Pacific Ocean off Majuro Atoll. Spadefish submerged and survived.
- 9 January – Friendly gunfire hit the superstructure of the U.S. Navy battleship USS Colorado in Lingayen Gulf off Luzon in the Philippines, killing 18 and wounding 51.
- 12 January
  - The U.S. Navy destroyer USS English (DD-696) mistook the U.S. Navy submarine USS Rock (SS-274) for a Japanese sailboat while Rock was on the surface in the South China Sea off Japanese-occupied French Indochina and opened gunfire on her at a range of 9,200 yards (8,400 m). Rock crash-dived to 300 feet (91 m) and sustained no damage.
  - Three United States Marine Corps F4U Corsairs of Marine Fighter Squadron 124 (VMF-124) shot down a four-engine bomber over French Indochina that had refused to identify itself and had fired on the planes. The aircraft later was identified as a United States Army Air Forces B-24 Liberator (serial number 42-73429) of the 374th Bombardment Squadron.
- 16 January – During the South China Sea raid, U.S. Navy bombers targeting transport and harbor facilities in Japanese-occupied Hong Kong mistakenly bombed the nearby village of Hung Hom, killing and wounding many civilians, and dropped one bomb in Stanley Internment Camp, killing 14 Allied civilian internees.
- 23 January – A group of RAF fighters strafed the assault gun platoon (105mm Sherman tanks) of US 743rd Tank Battalion, near Sart-Lez-St.Vith, Belgium, killing six men and wounding 15.
- 24 January – Near Guam, the U.S. Navy submarine USS Guardfish mistook the U.S. Navy rescue and salvage ship USS Extractor (ARS-15) for a Japanese submarine. She fired a torpedo which struck Extractor's starboard side, causing her to capsize and sink within five minutes at 15°44′N 135°29′E. Six crew were killed and 15 injured.
- 10 February
  - While at periscope depth in the South China Sea, the U.S. Navy submarine USS Batfish (SS-310) detected an incoming torpedo apparently dropped by a nearby U.S. Navy flying boat. Batfish went deep and the torpedo passed overhead.
  - Lieutenant Louis Edward Curdes, a USAAF P-51 pilot, shot down a USAAF C-47 about to land by mistake on a Japanese-held airstrip. All personnel on board the Skytrain survived.
- 15 February – The American Liberty ship SS Charles F. Amidon — which reported her position as 36°55′N 126°05′W — opened gunfire on the U.S. Navy submarine USS Crevalle (SS-291) in the Pacific Ocean at a range of 2,800 yards (2,560 m), firing eight rounds and claiming two hits. All rounds actually missed, and Crevalle — which reported her own position as 36°54′N 126°02′W — suffered no damage.
- 27 February – Calais suffered its last bombing raid by Royal Air Force bombers who mistook the by-now liberated town for Dunkirk, which was at that time still occupied by German forces.
- 1 March – Operating on the surface in heavy fog in the South China Sea, the U.S. Navy submarine USS Guitarro (SS-363) sighted a torpedo at a distance of 100 yards (91 m) which passed 100 yards (91 m) ahead of her. With strong indications of nearby U.S. SD and SJ submarine radars, she challenged what she presumed was a nearby U.S. submarine for 45 minutes via SJ radar signals before receiving a reply and exchanging recognition signals. The other submarine never identified itself, but the torpedo had come from its direction. Although unable to prove conclusively that they had been either in contact with or fired upon by another U.S. submarine, Guitarro′s crew concluded that they had nearly been the victims of a friendly fire incident.
- 3 March – The Royal Air Force mistakenly bombed the heavily populated Bezuidenhout quarter of The Hague, Holland. The target was an installation of V-2 rockets in the nearby Haagse Bos park, but because of navigational errors, the bombs all fell more than 500 yards (460 m) short of target. The bombardment wreaked widespread destruction in the area and caused 511 fatalities,
- 11 March – A U.S. Navy PBM Mariner flying boat attacked the U.S. Navy submarine USS Piranha (SS-389) in the South China Sea, dropping four bombs. Piranha took evasive action and avoided damage.
- 20 March – An Allied aircraft which the crew of the U.S. Navy submarine USS Piranha (SS-389) though was most likely a U.S. Army Air Forces B-24 Liberator bomber, bombed Piranha as she maneuvered evasively and submerged in the South China Sea. Piranha sustained no damage.
- 21 March – An Allied aircraft mistakenly attacked the U.S. Navy submarine USS Spadefish (SS-411) during a war patrol she was making in the Yellow Sea and East China Sea, dropping a bomb that exploded as she submerged which exploded as she passed a depth of 45 feet (14 m). She sustained no damage but her crew found bomb fragments on her deck after she surfaced.
- 31 March – The U.S. Navy destroyer USS Case (DD-370) opened gunfire on the U.S. Navy submarine USS Spot (SS-413) at a range of 5,500 yards (5,000 m) while Spot was on the surface in the Philippine Sea 425 nautical miles (787 km; 489 mi) southeast of Kagoshima, Kyushu, Japan at 29°14′N 137°18′E. Case fired fifteen 5-inch (127 mm) rounds, scoring no hits but straddling Spot′s conning tower with her third salvo as Spot crash-dived, before identifying Spot as a friendly submarine.
- 8 April – A U.S. Army Air Forces B-24 Liberator bomber dropped three or four bombs on the U.S. Navy submarine USS Bullhead (SS-332) as she submerged in the South China Sea 80 nautical miles (150 km; 92 mi) southwest of Macao, China.Bullhead suffered no damage.
- 9 April –
  - A United States Marine Corps Reserve pilot of U.S. Navy Bombing Fighter Squadron 83 (VBF-83) from the aircraft carrier USS Essex (CV-9) testing the guns of his F4U Corsair fighter inadvertently fired toward the U.S. Navy submarine USS Sea Devil (SS-400) while she was on the surface south of southern Japan. One tracer round almost struck Sea Devil′s officer of the deck.
  - Battle of Bologna – U.S. air force bombers flying overhead killed 38 troops of the Polish 2nd Corps during the Allied ground troops' opening advance on German-held Bologna that day.
- 14 April – The German submarine U-235, en route to Norway, was sunk by a German torpedo boat with no survivors.
- 17 April
  - While flying over Berlin, Soviet air ace Ivan Kozhedub encountered a group of U.S. Army Air Forces B-17 Flying Fortresses under attack by Luftwaffe aircraft. American escort fighters mistook his aircraft for a Luftwaffe fighter and attacked him. Kozhedub reported that while defending himself he shot down two U.S. Army Air Forces P-51 Mustangs. U.S. records do not confirm the loss of two P-51s over Berlin that day.
  - MACR 13919. Pilot Robert Thacker bailed out in German Lines and became POW. 72227 (HQ, 55th FG, 8th AF) shot down by AAA near Dresden, Germany Apr 17, 1945. MACR 13916. Made wheels up belly landing. Pilot Righetti survived although he crashed landed in a Soviet controlled section he is believed killed by German civilians
- 19 April
  - An Allied aircraft — probably a U.S. Army Air Forces B-24 Liberator bomber — dropped two depth charges on the U.S. Navy submarine USS Bullhead (SS-332) as she submerged in the South China Sea. The depth charges detonated as Bullhead reached 100 feet (30 m). She suffered no damage.
  - A U.S. Army Air Forces B-24 Liberator bomber strafed the U.S. Navy submarine USS Pogy (SS-266) while Pogy was on lifeguard duty in the Pacific Ocean southeast of Honshu, Japan, at 32°59′N 139°58′E. As Pogy submerged, the B-24 dropped a bomb which detonated as she passed through a depth of 30 feet (9.1 m). The strafing inflicted minor but extensive damage on Pogy, but she suffered no casualties and was able to remain on patrol.
- 24 April – The Royal Air Force, carrying out an air raid on Rangoon, Burma, bombed a jail in the belief that it was a command center for the Imperial Japanese Army. The jail actually was the incarceration site of Allied prisoners-of-war. Over 30 Allied POWs were killed.
- 29 April – A U.S. Army Air Forces B-24 Liberator dropped a bomb on the U.S. Navy submarine USS Baya (SS-318) in the South China Sea approximately 15 nautical miles (28 km; 17 mi) east-northeast of Pulo Cecil de Mer, French Indochina, at 10°34′N 109°09′E. The bomb exploded about 1,500 yards (1,370 m) ahead of Baya, which suffered no damage.
- 3 May – Cap Arcona incident: Although it did not involve troops in combat, this incident has been referred to as "the worst friendly-fire incident in history". On 3 May, the three ships Cap Arcona, Thielbek, and the SS Deutschland in Lübeck Harbour were sunk in four separate, but synchronized attacks with bombs, rockets, and cannons by the Royal Air Force, resulting in the death of over 7,000 Jewish concentration camp survivors and Russian prisoners of war, along with POWs from several other allied nations. The British pilots were unaware that these ships carried POWs and concentration camp survivors, although British documents were released in the 1970s that state the Swedish government had informed the RAF command of the risk prior to the attack.
- 14 May – Several days after the German surrender, U-boat ace Wolfgang Luth was shot and killed by a sentry while walking after dark at the German naval base at Flensburg-Marwik.
- 13 June – The U.S. Navy submarine USS Spadefish (SS-411) mistakenly sank the Soviet merchant ship Transbalt in the Sea of Japan at 45°44′N 140°48′E.
- 22 June – The U.S. Navy submarine USS Trepang (SS-412) was on the surface in the Pacific Ocean 20 nautical miles (37 km; 23 mi) southeast of Daiozaki Light on the coast of Honshu, Japan, when a flight of seven United States Army Air Forces B-29 Superfortress bombers jettisoned three bombs which straddled her, one landing 1,000 yards (910 m) off her port bow and two landing 2,000 yards (1,800 m) off her starboard quarter. She suffered no damage or casualties.
- 26 June – The U.S. Navy submarine USS Sea Robin (SS-407) was on the surface in the East China Sea at 31°30′N 138°37′E, about 105 nautical miles (194 km; 121 mi) southwest of Aogashima in the Nanpō Islands, on lifeguard duty in support of air raids on Japan by U.S. Army Air Forces B-29 Superfortress bombers when a full load of bombs a B-29 jettisoned through overcast landed in the sea only 1,000 yards (910 m) from her. She suffered no damage or casualties.
- 3 July – While covering the invasion of Balikpapan in Borneo, Australian war correspondents John Elliot and William Smith went ahead of the advancing Australian troops; an Australian Bren gunner, believing them to be Japanese troops, shot and killed them.
- 14 July – In the East China Sea, a U.S. aircraft dropped two torpedoes targeting the U.S. Navy submarine USS Batfish (SS-310). The torpedoes passed ahead of Batfish.
- 18 July – The U.S. Navy destroyers USS Hank (DD-702) and USS Wallace L. Lind (DD-703) opened gunfire on the U.S. Navy submarine USS Gabilan (SS-252) at a range of 12,800 yards (12,000 m) while Gabilan was on the surface in the Pacific Ocean off the Bōsō Peninsula, Honshu, Japan, at 35°05′N 140°50′E. Gabilan had difficulty diving in heavy seas and broached, and the destroyers' gunfire straddled her an estimated ten times before she finally submerged undamaged to a depth of 150 feet (46 m), and later to 300 feet (91 m) as the destroyers approached.
- 24 July – The U.S. Navy destroyer USS Colahan (DD-658) opened gunfire on the U.S. Navy submarine USS Toro (SS-422) at a range of 7,400 yards (6,800 m) while Toro was on the surface performing lifeguard duty for Allied air strikes south of Shikoku, Japan. Colohan straddled Toro with her first salvo, and Toro crash-dived to a depth of 400 feet (122 m), sustaining no damage or casualties. Colohan was still firing as Toro passed a depth of 150 feet (46 m).
- 1 August – An Okinawa-based U.S. Army Air Forces B-25 Mitchell bomber aircraft dropped five bombs on the U.S. Navy submarine USS Batfish (SS-310) in the East China Sea off the southwest coast of Kyushu, Japan, in the vicinity of 31°25′00″N 129°51′30″E. The bombs missed, and Batfish submerged and avoided damage.
- 6 and 9 August – 20 Allied POWs died in the atomic bombings of Hiroshima and Nagasaki.

== Afghan tribal revolts of 1944–1947 ==
- It was rumoured that on one occasion during the revolts, Afghan aircraft accidentally bombed and machine gunned government troops or allied tribal levies, causing 40 casualties.

== Palestine Emergency (1945–1948) ==
- In 1946, Lieutenant (later Lieutenant-Colonel) Colin Campbell Mitchell of the Argyll and Sutherland Highlanders was deployed with his battalion in a crackdown on Jewish militants. On one personal reconnaissance mission he was shot and wounded by one of his own Bren gunners surprised by gunfire and seeing someone moving towards him, but subsequently recovered.
- During the Acre Prison break, a 1947 raid on Acre Prison by the Irgun to free imprisoned Irgun and Lehi members, Lehi fighter and escaped prisoner Shimshon Vilner was accidentally killed by Bren gun fire from the Irgun commander of the operation, Dov Cohen, during a firefight with British troops.

== 1948 Arab–Israeli War ==
- 10 June – Mickey Marcus, the Israel Defense Forces' first general, was shot and killed by a sentry while returning at night to his headquarters.

== Korean War ==
- 3 July 1950 – Eight P-51 Mustangs of No. 77 Squadron RAAF strafed and destroyed a train carrying thousands of American and South Korean soldiers who were mistaken for a North Korean convoy in the main highway between Suwon and P'yongtaek, causing more than 700 casualties. Before the attack, the Australian pilots had been originally assured by the United States Fifth Air Force Tactical Control Centre that the area under attack was in North Korean hands. However, they were later told to hold fire so that the Fifth Air Force can verify the train's identification. One Australian pilot, believing the train was indeed carrying North Korean forces, ignored the order and strafed the train, with his squadron following the lead as well.
- 23 September 1950 – Hill 282 was attacked by 1st Battalion, Argyll & Sutherland Highlanders, part of the British 27th Infantry Brigade in the United Nations Command. Having captured it and facing strong Korean People's Army counter-attacks, the Argylls, devoid of artillery support, called in a UN air-strike. A group of United States Air Force F-51 Mustangs of the 18th Fighter Bomber Wing circled the hill. The Argylls had laid down white air-recognition panels, but the North Koreans imitated similar panels on their own positions in white as well. It was later found out that several British air controllers mistakenly did not inform the pilots of proper air-recognition panels and the Argylls Captain was unable to contact the F-51s due to his defective radio. As a result, the planes mistakenly napalm-bombed and strafed the Argylls' hill-top positions. Despite a desperate counter-attack by the Argylls to regain the hill, for which Major Kenneth Muir was awarded a posthumous Victoria Cross, the Argylls, much reduced in numbers, were forced to relinquish the position. Over 60 of the Argylls' casualties were caused by friendly air-strike.
- 26 November 1950 – During the Battle of Wawon, fleeing soldiers of the Republic of Korea Army II Corps were mistaken by the Turkish Brigade for Chinese, which led to an exchange of fire. As a result, 20 South Korean soldiers were killed and four others wounded, with 14 Turkish deaths and six wounded.
- 25 April 1951 – As infantrymen of the 1st Battalion of the British Gloucestershire Regiment tried to break out of a Chinese encirclement and reach United Nations lines at the end of the Battle of the Imjin River, American tanks mistook them for advancing Chinese soldiers and opened fire, inflicting at least six casualties on the British before realizing their mistake and shifting fire to the Chinese pursuing the British.
- 5 December 1952 – RCAF Squadron Leader Andy MacKenzie (a World War II ace) was shot down by his own squadron mate during a dogfight. Captured by Chinese forces, he was kept prisoner for two years, being released in December 1954.

== 1956 Suez Crisis ==
- 30 October - Israeli Air Force aircraft providing air support for an Israeli assault in the vicinity of Abu Uwayulah repeatedly hit Israeli ground forces by accident.
- 3 November – During first phase of Israeli air operations, Israeli Air Force P-51 Mustang and Mystere fighter attacked a British warship, the Black Swan class sloop HMS Crane as it was patrolling the approaches to the Gulf of Aqaba. According to the IDF, Crane had been identified as an Egyptian warship. The ship was attacked with rockets, cannon fire, and napalm bombs. Its captain reported light damage, and three crewmen were lightly injured in the attack. The ship put up heavy anti-aircraft fire, and there are conflicting accounts as to whether it shot down an Israeli aircraft or not.
- 6 November – British commandos of No. 45 Commando Royal Marines, assaulting Port Said by helicopter, suffered friendly fire from British carrier-borne Westland Wyvern aircraft which mistakenly hit 45 Commando and HQ. One Marine was killed and 15 wounded when a carrier-based Wyvern mistakenly fired into a concentration of Marines.

== Vietnam War ==
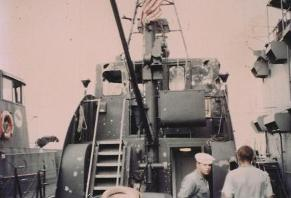
Aft view of the bridge of USCGC Point Welcome after the friendly fire incident of 11 August 1966.

It has been estimated that there may have been as many as 8,000 friendly fire incidents in the Vietnam War; one was the inspiration for the book and film Friendly Fire.

- 2 January 1966, in Bao Trai in the Mekong Delta during joint Australian/American forces fighting the Viet Cong, a USAF Cessna O-1 Bird Dog flying at low level accidentally flew through Australian and New Zealand artillery fire. The aircraft tail was blown off and the aircraft dived into the ground, killing the pilot instantly.
- 3 January 1966, near Bao Trai, at midnight, Sergeant Jerry Morton from 'C' Company, the 1st Battalion, Royal Australian Regiment had called in marker white phosphorus rounds ahead of the company from the supporting New Zealand gun battery on a suspected enemy position. However, due to the bad coordinates given by Morton, the rounds instead landed on the Australian forces. Morton along with another Australian soldier were killed and several others wounded.
- 3 January 1966, two rounds fired by 161 Battery, Royal New Zealand Artillery accidentally landed on C Company, 2/503rd Regiment, US 173rd Airborne Brigade, killing three paratroopers and wounding seven during Operation Marauder. The short rounds were found to have happened due to damp powder.
- 11 August 1966, while supporting Operation Market Time, USCGC Point Welcome was attacked by USAF aircraft, resulting in the deaths of two Coast Guardsmen.
- 29 December 1966, a premature burst of a 105mm round from an LVTH-6 killed five Marines and wounded two more east of Dong Ha in Quang Tri.
- 6 February 1967, twelve rounds from New Zealand artillery accidentally landed on the Australian 'D' Company 6th Battalion, Royal Australian Regiment, killing four and injuring thirteen, west of Song Rai river between Nui Dat and Xuyên Mộc District.
- 3 August 1967, a C-7 Caribou transport plane was approaching the special forces camp at Đức Phổ when it flew into line of fire from a U.S. Army 155 mm howitzer. The tail section separated and the airplane fell down, killing the crew. A cease fire had been issued but failed to reach the gun crew in time. The Caribou was photographed just before it hit the ground.
- 19 November 1967, during the Battle of Dak To a U.S. Marine Corps A-4 Skyhawk aircraft flown by Lieutenant Colonel Richard Taber dropped two 250 lb (110 kg) bombs on the command post of the 2nd Battalion (Airborne) 503d Infantry, 173d Airborne Brigade while they were in heavy contact with a numerically superior People's Army of Vietnam force. At least 45 paratroopers were killed and another 45 wounded. Also killed was the Battalion Chaplain Major Charles J. Watters, who was subsequently awarded the Medal of Honor.
- 16–17 June 1968, HMAS Hobart, USS Boston and USS Edson were attacked by US aircraft. At 03:09, Hobart's radar picked up an aircraft approaching with no IFF transponder active. At 03:14, the aircraft fired a single missile at the ship which killed one sailor, wounded two others and damaged the ship. Two minutes later, the aircraft made a second pass and fired two missiles which caused further damage, killed another sailor and wounded six others. The aircraft came around for a third attack run, but was scared off when Hobart's forward gun turret, under independent control, fired five rounds at it. At 03:30, USS Edson, in company with Hobart, reported coming under fire, and Hobart's captain ordered both destroyers and USS Theodore E. Chandler to take up anti-aircraft formation. At 05:15, the three destroyers linked up with the cruiser USS Boston (which had been hit by a missile from another aircraft) and the escorting destroyer USS Blandy, and continued anti-aircraft manoeuvring. Debris collected from Hobart and the other ships indicated that the missiles were of United States Air Force (USAF) origin. The attacks on Hobart and the other ships were the capstone of a series of firing incidents between 15 and 17 June, and an inquiry was held by the USN into the incidents, with three RAN personnel attending as technical advisors. The inquiry found that a few hours before the attack on Hobart, Swift boats PCF-12 and PCF-19, along with USCGC Point Dume, were attacked by what they identified at the time as hovering enemy aircraft, but were believed to be friendly planes; PCF-19 was sunk in the attack. F-4 Phantoms of the USAF Seventh Air Force, responding several hours after the attack on the Swift boats, were unable to distinguish between the radar signature of surface ships and airborne helicopters, and instead opened fire on Hobart, Boston, and Edson.
- 11 May 1969, during the Battle of Hamburger Hill, Lieutenant Colonel Weldon Honeycutt directed helicopter gunships, from an aerial rocket artillery (ARA) battery, to support an infantry assault. In the heavy jungle, the helicopters mistook the command post of the 3/187th battalion for a Vietnamese unit and attacked, killing two and wounding thirty-five, including Honeycutt. This incident disrupted battalion command and control and forced 3/187th to withdraw into night defensive positions.
- 1 May 1970, during military operations in Phước Tuy Province, an Australian machine gunner opened fire on soldiers of the 8th Battalion, Royal Australian Regiment without warning, killing two and wounding two other soldiers.
- 20 July 1970, patrol units of 'D' Company 8th Battalion, 1st Australian Task Force outside the wire at Nui Dat called in a New Zealand battery fire mission as part of a training exercise. However, there was confusion at the gun position about the fire corrections issued by the inexperienced Australian officer with the patrol. The result was two rounds fell upon the patrol, killing two and wounding several others.
- 24 July 1970, New Zealand artillery guns accidentally shelled an Australian platoon, 1 Australian Reinforcement Unit, (1 ARU), killing two and wounding another four soldiers.
- 10 May 1972, a VPAF MiG-21 was shot down in error by a North Vietnamese surface-to-air missile near Tuyen Quang, killing a pilot.
- 2 June 1972, a VPAF MiG-19 was shot down in error by a North Vietnamese surface-to-air missile near Kep Province, killing a pilot.

== 1967 Six-Day War ==
- On the fourth day of the Six-Day War (8 Jun), at about 2 pm Sinai time (then, GMT+2), Israeli aircraft and torpedo boats attacked USS Liberty in international waters about 14 miles off the coast of the Sinai Peninsula, near El Arish, killing 34 (naval officers, seamen, two marines, and one civilian), and wounding 171 crew members; the ship was severely damaged. At the time, the ship was in international waters. Though controversially disputed by the survivors of the attack, both countries officially consider it to be a case of mistaken identity.

== The Troubles ==
- On 13 September 1969, British Lance Corporal Michael Spurway, of 24 Airportable HQ and Signal Squadron, was accidentally shot dead by a fellow British soldier while he was on the telephone to his wife, shortly after returning to his base at Gosford Castle after manning a rebroadcast station supporting 3 LI rear link communications.
- On 3 September 1972, two Royal Marines on patrol in Stratheden Street in New Lodge, Belfast, came into contact from separate directions and in the confusion, shot and killed a fellow Royal Marine, 18 year old Gunner Robert S. Cutting. At the time of Cutting's death, he had been on foot patrol in the New Lodge Road approaching Stratheden Street. A Royal Marine saw whom he thought was an enemy sniper and fired at him, injuring him. However, the Royal Marine shot him a second time as he attempted to crawl away, killing him instantly. There was no investigation into his death until 40 years later, when the MoD found out that the soldier who shot him did not observe the correct procedure for engagement. No charges were filed against the soldier who shot him.
- On 27 August 1979, in the aftermath of the Warrenpoint ambush, British soldiers fired across the Newry River into the Republic of Ireland about 3 km from the village of Omeath, County Louth, killing 29-year-old Londoner William Hudson and wounding his cousin Barry Hudson, a 25-year-old Irish native from Dingle. The two men were fishing in the area when they were fired upon.
- On 1 January 1980, Lieutenant Simon Bates, of 2 PARA, was commanding an ambush at Tullydonnell, near Forkhill. A cardinal principle of ambush orders was to never leave the position. However, for some reason, Bates and his radio operator, Private Gerald Hardy, left the ambush and were mistakenly killed by fellow British paratroopers while returning to their positions.
- On 15 June 1989, Royal Marine Adam Gilbert was shot and killed by a fellow marine when his platoon tried to stop a stolen car at a checkpoint on the junction of New Lodge road and Antrim road, Belfast.

== 1974 Turkish invasion of Cyprus ==
- The Turkish Naval Forces destroyer Kocatepe was sunk by Turkish Air Force warplanes after being mistaken for a Greek ship.
- A fleet of Hellenic Air Force Nord Noratlas transport aircraft carrying reinforcements from Greece (Operation Niki) was mistaken for a flight of Turkish aircraft by Cypriot National Guard anti-aircraft gunners defending Nicosia International Airport, who opened fire. Of the 13 planes that came flew in, 1 was shot down and 3 more written off and later destroyed. Greek casualties were at least 33 dead including both commandos and aircrew and another 10 wounded.
- During the Battle of Pentemili beachhead, Colonel Karaoglanoglu, the commander of the Turkish Army's 50th Infantry Regiment, was killed in a villa near the beachhead. Although the official cause of his death was enemy mortar or artillery fire, another Turkish General claimed that he was actually killed by friendly M20 Super Bazooka fire.

== Rhodesian Bush War ==
- On November 7, 1976, Canadian spree killer Mathew Charles Lamb was fatally shot by one of his own men in the Rhodesian Special Air Service while carrying out an operation to destroy militants in the Mutema Tribal Trade Lands, Manicaland province, Rhodesia.

== First Lebanon War ==
During the 1982 Lebanon War, the worst friendly fire incident in the history of the Israeli Defence Forces (IDF) took place. On 10 June 1982, the Israeli Air Force (IAF) mistook a column of IDF Nahal Brigade forces for a Syrian commando unit. An IAF F-4 Phantom attacked members of Battalion 931, advancing in open Armoured Personnel Carriers in south-eastern Lebanon with cluster munitions. The unit suffered 24 soldiers killed and 108 wounded, with a further 30 soldiers shell shocked.

== 1982 Falklands War ==
- A Dassault Mirage III was shot down by Argentine Anti-Aircraft and small arms fire at Port Stanley on 1 May while an A-4 Skyhawk was downed by a 35 mm antiaircraft battery near Goose Green on 12 May. Both aircraft belonged to the Argentine Air Force.
- 2 June – A friendly fire incident took place between the SAS and the Special Boat Squadron (SBS). An SBS patrol had apparently strayed into the SAS patrol's designated area and were mistaken for Argentine forces. A brief firefight was initiated during which one of the SBS patrol, Sergeant Ian Hunt, was killed.
- 1982 British Army Gazelle friendly fire incident – Due to a lack of communication between the Army and the Navy, the destroyer HMS Cardiff shot down a British Gazelle helicopter over the Falkland Islands, killing four British soldiers. The MoD immediately covered up the incident, saying that the soldiers were killed by enemy fire. However, four years later, under intense pressure and scrutiny, the MoD finally admitted that they were killed by friendly fire.
- On 11 June, shortly before the Battle of Two Sisters, British Royal Marines of 45 Commando on a reconnaissance patrol were mistaken for Argentine units in the dark. A British mortar team opened fire and received return fire from the patrol. In the confusion, four British Marines were killed, including the mortar troop sergeant and three others wounded. Those killed were Sergeant Robert Leeming, Corporal Peter Fitton, Corporal Andy Uren and Marine Keith Phillips.
- 11 June – A British Royal Navy frigate, HMS Avenger (F185), fired a 4.5 inch explosive shell into a house while shelling Port Stanley, killing three British women and wounding several others. They remained the only British civilian casualties of the war.

== 1991 Persian Gulf War ==
- During the Battle of Khafji, 11 American Marines were killed in two major incidents when their light armored vehicles (LAV's) were hit by missiles fired by a USAF A-10.
- Two soldiers of the U.S. Army were killed and a further six wounded when an American Boeing AH-64 Apache attack helicopter fired upon and destroyed a U.S. Army Bradley Fighting Vehicle and an M113 Armoured Personnel Carrier (in the same incident) during night operations.
- A British officer was severely injured when his FV510 Warrior vehicle was attacked by a Challenger 1 tank of the Royal Scots Dragoon Guards.
- A U.S. Air Force A-10 during Operation Desert Storm attacked British Warrior MICVs, resulting in nine British dead and numerous casualties. Subsequently, an Oxford inquest returned a verdict of unlawful killings.
- During the Battle of Phase Line Bullet, American M1 Abrams tanks in the rear fired in support of American troops facing dug-in Iraqi Army troops. American Infantry Fighting Vehicles were hit by fire from the tanks, resulting in two fatalities.
- Several friendly fire incidents took place during the Battle of 73 Easting, wounding 57 American soldiers, but causing no fatalities.
- One American soldier was killed by friendly fire during the Battle of Medina Ridge.
- Two soldiers from 10 Air Defence Battery, Royal Artillery, were badly injured when two FV103 Spartan from which they had dismounted were fired upon by Challenger 1 tanks from 14th/20th King's Hussars with thermal sights beyond the range of unaided visibility (about 1500 m). The rearmost vehicle was hit and burst into flames. The other vehicle was also damaged in the ensuing fire.
- A large number of friendly fire incidents took place during the Battle of Norfolk, resulting in 5 American casualties.

== War in Afghanistan (2001–2021) ==
- On December 5, 2001, an Air Force Boeing B-52 Stratofortress dropped a 2,000 pound bomb on a group of American soldiers, killing three members of the 5th Special Forces Group.
- In the Tarnak Farm incident of 18 April 2002, four Canadian soldiers were killed and eight others injured when U.S. Air National Guard Major Harry Schmidt dropped a laser-guided 500 lb (230 kg) bomb from his F-16 jet fighter on the Princess Patricia's Canadian Light Infantry regiment which was conducting a night firing exercise near Kandahar. Schmidt was charged with negligent manslaughter, aggravated assault, and dereliction of duty. He was found guilty of the latter charge. During testimony Schmidt blamed the incident on his use of "go pills" (authorized mild stimulants), combined with the 'fog of war'. The Canadian dead received US medals for bravery, along with an apology.
- Army Ranger Specialist Pat Tillman, a former professional American football player, was shot and killed by American fire on 22 April 2004. An Army Special Operations Command investigation was conducted by Brigadier General Gary Jones and the U.S. Department of Defense concluded that Tillman's death was due to friendly fire aggravated by the intensity of the firefight. A more thorough investigation concluded that no hostile forces were involved in the firefight and that two allied groups fired on each other in confusion after a nearby improvised explosive device was detonated.
- On 6 April 2006, a British convoy in Afghanistan wounded 13 Afghan police officers and killed seven, after calling in a US airstrike on what they thought was a Taliban attack.
- In Sangin Province, a RAF Harrier pilot allegedly mistakenly strafed British troops missing the enemy by 200 metres during a firefight with the Taliban on 20 August 2006. This angered British Major James Loden of 3rd Bn Parachute Regiment, who in a leaked email called the RAF, "Completely incompetent and utterly, utterly useless in protecting ground troops in Afghanistan".
- Canadian soldiers opened fire on a white pickup truck, about 25 kilometres west of Kandahar, killing an Afghan officer with 6 others injured on 26 August 2006.
- Operation Medusa (2006): One–two U.S. A-10 Thunderbolts mistakenly strafed NATO forces in southern Afghanistan, killing one Canadian, Private Mark Anthony Graham, and wounding 30 other Canadian soldiers, 5 seriously.
- On 5 December 2006, an F/A-18C Hornet on a close air support mission in Helmand Province, Afghanistan, mistakenly attacked a trench where British Royal Marines were dug-in during a 10-hour battle with Taliban fighters, killing one Royal Marine.
- Lance Corporal Matthew Ford, from Zulu Company of 45 Commando Royal Marines, died after receiving a gunshot wound in Afghanistan on 15 January 2007, which was later found to be due to friendly fire. The final inquest ruled he died from NATO rounds from a fellow Royal Marine's machine gun. The report added there was no "negligence" by the other Marine, who had made a "momentary error of judgment".
- Canadian troops mistakenly killed an Afghan National Police officer and a civilian after their convoy was ambushed in Kandahar City.
- 23 August 2007: A USAF F-15 called in to support British ground forces in Afghanistan dropped a bomb on those forces. Three privates of the 1st Battalion, the Royal Anglian Regiment, were killed and two others were severely injured. The coroner at the soldiers' inquest stated that the incident was due to "flawed application of procedures" rather than individual errors or "recklessness".
- On 26 September 2007, British soldiers in operations in Helmand Province, Afghanistan, fired Javelin anti-tank missiles at Danish soldiers from the Royal Life Guards, killing two. It is also confirmed from Danish forces that the British fired a six–eight Javelin missiles, over a 1 1/2 hour period and only after the attack was completed did they realize that the missiles were British, based upon the fragments found after the incident.
- On 12 January 2008, two Dutch soldiers and two allied Afghan soldiers were shot dead by fellow Dutch soldiers in Uruzgan, Afghanistan.
- In the night on 14 January 2008 in Helmand Province, British troops saw a group of Afghans "conducting suspicious activities". Visibility was too bad for rifle-fire and they were too far away to call in mortar strikes. The squad decided to use a Javelin anti-tank missile they were carrying. British soldiers fired their missile on the nearby roof but the victims were their own Afghan army sentries. 15 Afghan soldiers were killed.
- Between January 2008 and June 2009, Afghan military, police, and security personnel came under fire by British troops at least 10 times, resulting in seven deaths. The most serious incident occurred in the Lashkargah District of Helmand Province in October 2008, in which British troops opened fire on Afghan National Police officers that killed three and injured another.
- On 9 July 2008, nine British soldiers from the 2nd Battalion, The Parachute Regiment were injured after being fired upon by a British Army Apache helicopter while on patrol in Afghanistan.
- A statement issued jointly by the American and the Afghan military commands said a contingent of Afghan police officers fired on United States forces on 10 December 2008 after the Americans had successfully overrun the hide-out, killing the suspected Taliban commander and detaining another man. The US forces after securing the hideout came under heavy small arms fire and explosive grenades from the Afghan Police forces. "Multiple attempts to deter the engagement were unsuccessful," and the US forces returned fire. Afghan police have stated that they came under fire first and that the initial firing on the US forces came from the building next to the police station. This has led the US forces to conclude that the Afghan police forces might have been compromised. Initial reports indicate that this was a tragic case of mistaken identity on both parts.
- Captain Tom Sawyer, aged 26, 29 Commando Regiment Royal Artillery, and Corporal Danny Winter, aged 28, Zulu Company 45 Commando Royal Marines, were killed by an explosion on 14 January 2009 from a Javelin missile fired by British troops acting on the orders of a Danish officer. Both men were taking part in a joint operation with a Danish Battle Group and the Afghan National Army in a location north east of Gereshk in central Helmand Province.
- On 9 September 2009, British Special Boat Service forces were sent to rescue New York Times journalist Stephen Farrell and his Afghan translator Sultan Munadi who were kidnapped by Taliban forces in northern Afghanistan near Kunduz four days earlier. During the raid, Farrell was rescued, but Munadi was shot and killed in the firefight between the Taliban and British forces. It was later found out that Munadi was running towards the helicopter when he was shot in the front by a British soldier, in addition to being shot in the back by the Taliban, after the British mistook him for the Taliban. Two Afghan civilians also died from the hail of bullets by British and Taliban forces.
- A British Military Police officer was shot dead by a fellow British soldier while on patrol. It was reported that no charges were to be brought against a British army sniper who killed a British Military Policeman because he was allowed to open fire if he believed that his life was in danger.
- In December 2009, British commanders called upon a U.S. airstrike which killed Lance Corporal Christopher Roney from 3rd Battalion The Rifles who was engaging along with his comrades with the Taliban. The incident happened when a firefight was going on between British soldiers of 3rd Battalion The Rifles and the insurgents in Sangin Province. Senior British officers were watching a drone's grainy images of the fight from Camp Bastion, about 30 miles from the battle at Patrol Base Almas. The officers mistook the soldiers' mud-walled compound for an enemy position and called down a U.S. Apache airstrike on the base. Roney was fatally shot in the head after a helicopter gunship opened fire on the base. He died later the next day after being taken to Camp Bastion. Eleven other British soldiers were wounded in the attack.
- German soldiers killed six Afghan soldiers in a friendly fire incident on their way to attack a group of Taliban. Afghan soldiers were traveling in support of other Afghan troops in the area.
- Sapper Mark Antony Smith, age 26, of the 36 Engineer Regiment, Royal Engineers, was killed by a smoke shell fired upon by British troops in Sangin Province, Afghanistan. The MoD were investigation his death and said a smoke shell, designed to provide cover for soldiers working on the ground, may have fallen short of its intended target.
- Friendly fire between ISAF and Pakistan on 26 November 2011. ISAF forces opened fire on Pakistan Army forces killing 24 Pakistani soldiers and causing a great diplomatic standoff between U.S. and Pakistan. ISAF forces argue they were there to hunt down militants at the AF-PAK border. Pakistan had stopped transit of goods through its territory to ISAF in Afghanistan because of the incident. After an official apology by US Secretary of State Hillary Clinton on 3 July 2012 the NATO supply routes were restored.
- Two New Zealand soldiers were wounded by friendly fire from a 25mm gun mounted on an armored New Zealand LAV during a 12-minute firefight with insurgents in Bamyan Province on 4 August 2012.
- A British female soldier and a Royal Marine man were mistakenly killed by another British unit on patrol after her unit opened fire on an Afghan policeman assuming he was a Taliban insurgent. The British unit who killed the female soldier and the Royal Marine assumed they were under attack after the firing happened.
- Five United States Special forces operatives, and an Afghan Army counterpart were killed by friendly fire in Southern Zabul Province on June 9, 2014. Whilst on patrol, and coming under heavy Taliban fire, an air-strike was called in and a B-1 Lancer bomber misdirected its payload killing the six military personnel amongst others.

== Iraq War (2003–2011) ==
- March 21, 2003 – Umm Qasr, Iraq: In the opening days of the 2003 invasion of Iraq (2003 invasion of Iraq), U.S. Marine Lance Corporal José Gutiérrez, a Guatemalan-born Marine who had not yet obtained U.S. citizenship, was fatally shot by another Marine who mistook him for an Iraqi combatant. Subsequent reporting by NPR and CBS

Video of the 28 March 2003 friendly fire incident, showing errors of identification

- In the Battle of Nasiriyah, an American force of Amphibious Assault Vehicles (AAVs) and infantry under intense enemy fire were misidentified as an Iraqi armored column by two U.S. Air Force A-10s who carried out strafing runs on them. At least one Marine died as a result.
- A U.S. Patriot missile shot down a British Panavia Tornado GR.4A of No. 13 Squadron RAF, killing the pilot and navigator. Investigations showed that the Tornado's identification friend or foe indicator had malfunctioned and hence it was not identified as a friendly aircraft.
- An F-14 Tomcat aircrew from VF-32 was involved in the worst friendly fire incident of the war when on 6 April 2003 an F-14 crew was cleared to attack an Iraqi tank near Dibakan, 30 miles (48 km) southeast of Mosul. Instead, they mistakenly dropped a single laser-guided bomb on a vehicle convoy consisting of US Special Forces and Kurdish resistance fighters, killing 18 Kurdish fighters, 4 US soldiers and a BBC translator; Kamaran Abdurazaq Muhamed. An additional 80 people were wounded including BBC reporter Tom Giles and World Affairs Editor John Simpson. An investigation following the war found that the pilot had been cleared to drop without the benefit of target coordinates provided by the Forward Air Controller, who was "operating under great stress" at the time. The incident was filmed.
- Sgt Steven Roberts, a tank commander of the 2nd Royal Tank Regiment, was killed when a fellow British soldier manning a tank-mounted machine gun mistakenly hit him while firing at a stone wielding Iraqi protester at a roadblock in Az Zubayr near Basra on 24 March 2003. It was reported that no British soldiers were to be charged for his death.
- A British Challenger 2 tank came under fire from another British tank in a nighttime firefight. The turret was blown off and two of the crewmembers were killed.
- 190th Fighter Squadron/Blues and Royals friendly fire incident – 28 March 2003. A pair of American A-10s from the 190th attacked four British armoured reconnaissance vehicles of the Blues and Royals, killing L/CoH. Matty Hull and injuring five others.
- British Royal Marine Christopher Maddison was killed when his river patrol boat was hit by missiles after being wrongly identified as an enemy vessel approaching a Royal Engineers checkpoint on the Al-Faw Peninsula, Iraq, on 30 March 2003.
- U.S. Patriot missile batteries fired two missiles on a U.S. Navy F/A-18C Hornet 50 mi (80 km) from Karbala, Iraq. One missile hit the aircraft of pilot Lieutenant Nathan Dennis White of VFA-195, Carrier Air Wing Five, killing him on April 2, 2003. This was the result of the missile design flaw in identifying hostile aircraft.
- Fusilier In April 2003, Kelan Turrington, of the 1st Battalion, Royal Regiment of Fusiliers, was killed by machine-gun fire from a British tank.
- On April 12, 2004, during the First Battle of Fallujah (First Battle of Fallujah), U.S. Marines from the 2nd Battalion, 1st Marines () operating in Fallujah, Iraq, mistakenly fired an 81 mm mortar round that struck a schoolhouse occupied by members of Echo Company, 2/1. The explosion killed two Marines and an Iraqi interpreter who was working with U.S. forces. Lance Corporal Robert Zurheide Jr. died immediately. Lance Corporal Brad Shuder and the interpreter, identified as Shihab, died soon after from injuries sustained at the school. A dozen other Marines and soldiers were wounded, several seriously. Tomas Etzler, a CNN producer who was present at the schoolhouse, was also injured in the blast. According to a 2023 NPR investigation and its companion podcast Taking Cover, the incident was not accurately reported at the time, and information about the friendly fire was withheld from families and some of the surviving service members.
- American soldier Mario Lozano killed an Italian intelligence officer Nicola Calipari and is suspected of wounding Italian journalist Giuliana Sgrena in Baghdad. Sgrena was rescued from a kidnapping by Calipari, and it was claimed that the car they were escaping in failed to stop at an American checkpoint, whereupon U.S. soldiers opened fire. Video evidence shows the car was respecting speed limits and proceeding with its headlights on. The shooting commenced well before 50 meters, in contrast with what Lozano and other soldiers testified.
- During a raid on 16 July 2006 to apprehend a key terrorist leader and accomplice in a suburb of North Basra, Cpl John Cosby, of the Devonshire and Dorset Regiment, was killed by a 5.56 mm round from a British-issued SA80. It was ruled to be a case of friendly fire by the coroner. It was reported that the British forces who shot him were unclear about the rules of engagement.
- An American airstrike killed eight Kurdish Iraqi soldiers. Kurdish officials advised U.S. helicopters hit the men who were guarding a branch of the Patriotic Union of Kurdistan (PUK) in Mosul. The U.S. military said the attack was launched after soldiers identified armed men in a bunker near a building reportedly used for bomb-making, and that American troops called for the men to put down their weapons in Arabic and Kurdish before launching the strike.
- Dave Sharrett, II was shot and killed in a firefight with insurgents near the village of Bichigan, north of Baghdad in January 2008, during Operation Hood Harvest. The incident has since been described as friendly fire.
- SPC Donald Oaks, SGT Todd Robbins, and SFC Randall Rehn of D Battery, 1st Battalion, 39th Field Artillery Regiment (MLRS, M270 A1), 3rd Infantry Division Artillery(Previously C Battery 3–13 FA), were killed when a US fighter jet mistook the rocket artillery from US MLRS as enemy targets on 3 April 2003 while 3rd ID DIVARTY conducted a counter fire battle with Iraqi positions along the Euphrates River. The ordnance struck the vehicles of the soldiers killing SFC Rehn instantly, while SGT Robbins and SPC Oaks died shortly after from their wounds. 5 other soldiers were WIA from the event.

== Israel-Gaza conflicts ==
- 1 June 2009 – an Israeli tank fired on a building in Jabalia occupied by Golani Brigade troops after mistaking them for Hamas fighters, killing three soldiers and wounding 20.
- 2 June 2009 – an Israeli officer was killed when an Israeli tank fired at a building he was positioned in, causing a wall to collapse on him.
- On 14 July 2014, an Israeli soldier, Staff Sergeant Eitan Barak, was killed during operational activity in the northern Gaza Strip, becoming the first Israeli fatality of the war. The Israeli military announced that he had probably been killed by errant Israeli tank fire.
- On 15 December 2023, the IDF issued a statement revealing that they had killed three of their own hostages in Shuja'iyya after they mistakenly "identified three Israeli hostages as a threat," resulting in them firing at and killing the three hostages, who were later identified after their bodies were returned to Israel.
- In January 2024, an investigation by Israeli newspaper Yedioth Ahronoth concluded that the IDF had in practice applied the Hannibal Directive from midnight of October 7, ordering all combat units to stop "at all costs" any attempt by Hamas militants to return to Gaza with hostages. IDF helicopters fired on cars trying to cross into Gaza. It is unclear how many hostages were killed by friendly fire as a result of the order.
- The recent fatalities of Israeli soldiers in an explosion in Gaza have highlighted the issue of friendly fire incidents in the region. James Stavridis, former supreme commander of NATO forces, underscored the irreversible consequences of discharging a weapon. The mishap took place while Israeli combat engineers were getting ready to demolish a Hamas facility. A nearby tank crew mistakenly opened fire, leading to an electricity pole collapsing and setting off the explosives. Six soldiers lost their lives, and 14 others sustained injuries in the blast. This event is part of a string of friendly fire incidents and accidents that have resulted in the deaths of Israeli soldiers since the attacks by Hamas in October.
- According to the Israeli military, since the ground invasion of Gaza beginning on October 29, 2023, an average of two to six soldiers were killed each week from friendly fire for a total of 18 soldiers out of 170 killed as of 1 January 2024. By 26 January, the number of IDF troops killed in friendly fire incidents had been increased to 36 out of 188 soldiers reported as killed. They were a part of the about 17% of soldiers war-related deaths that were classified as accidents. Of the deceased some were killed by Israeli airstrikes, shrapnel from their own explosives, being run over by Israeli armored vehicles, and mistakenly identified and hit with tank fire, shelling and/or guns. These numbers do not take into account injuries resulted from friendly fire, but the IDF has indicated that they have had reports of those.

== Syrian Civil War ==
- 2017 – While fighting the Islamic State of Iraq and the Levant in northern Syria, a United States Air Force aircraft was provided with incorrect coordinates, leading to an accidental airstrike on Syrian Democratic Forces (SDF) troops. 18 SDF fighters were killed.
- 17 September 2018 – Syrian air defences accidentally shot down a Russian Air Force Ilyushin Il-20M plane while responding to Israeli airstrikes. 15 Russian servicemembers died in the incident.

== Russian invasion of Ukraine ==
- 24 February 2022 – Russian soldiers kill a Lieutenant who was aiding two refugees.
- 20 June 2022 – International Legion units spent two hours in a firefight with Ukrainian special forces.
- 20 April 2023 – A Russian Su-34 fighter bomber accidentally dropped a bomb on the Russian city of Belgorod, causing destruction and several injuries.
- 29 September 2023 – A Russian Sukhoi Su-35 was shot down by an S-300 missile system near Tokmak in the Zaporizhzhya region.

== Iran war (2026) ==
- On 2 March, three American F-15Es were mistakenly downed over Kuwait by friendly Kuwaiti air defenses. The six crew members on the jets ejected safely and were recovered by American officials soon after landing.
- On 4 March, one MQ-9 Reaper was believed to have been shot down by Qatari air defenses

== Other incidents ==
- 1565 – Great Siege of Malta: According to some sources, Ottoman Army general Turgut Reis was mortally wounded by friendly fire from Turkish cannons.
- 1991 – Gulf War: On 17 February, LTC Ralph Hayles, commanding an AH-64 Apache Helicopter, engaged two friendly vehicles with Hellfire missiles, killing two American soldiers and wounding six more.
- 1994 – 1994 Black Hawk shootdown incident: Two USAF F-15s involved with Operation Provide Comfort shot down two U.S. Army UH-60 Black Hawk helicopters over northern Iraq, killing 26 Coalition military and civilian personnel.
- 2000 – Grozny OMON fratricide incident. 20 Russian OMON policemen died.
- 2006 – Ingush–Chechen fratricide incident
- 2011 – 2011 Libyan civil war: A MiG-23BN flying for the Free Libyan Air Force was shot down over Benghazi when it was mistaken for a Libyan Air Force fighter. The pilot was killed after he ejected too late.
- 2015 – Operation Impact: A Canadian Special Operations Regiment team returning to an Observation post were mistakenly engaged by Iraqi Kurdish forces, killing sergeant Andrew Joseph Doiron and wounding three others.
- 2017 – On 31 May, during the Marawi crisis in the Philippines, the military's SIAI-Marchetti S.211 was on a bombing run over Maute Group positions when one bomb accidentally hit an army position locked in close-range with the ISIS-backed militants, killing 11 soldiers and wounding seven others.
- 2019 – On 27 February 2019, an Indian Mil Mi-17 helicopter was shot down by Indian air defense forces after being misidentified as a Pakistani military jet. Five Indian officers were found guilty of various charges relating to the incident, which killed all six Indian Air Force personnel on board the helicopter.
- 2020 – On 11 May, Iranian support vessel Konarak was hit reportedly by a missile fired from Iranian frigate Jamaran. Officials stated that 19 were killed and 15 others injured.
- 2024 – On 8 December, during the 2024 Israeli invasion of Lebanon, an accidental detonation killed 4 Israeli soldiers as they were demolishing a Hezbollah tunnel in southern Lebanon.
- 2024 – On 22 December, a United States Navy F/A-18F Super Hornet belonging to VFA-11 and flying off the USS Harry S Truman was accidentally shot down over the Red Sea in a friendly-fire incident by the USS Gettysburg (CG-64), which was part of the USS Harry S Truman Carrier Strike Group. Both pilots ejected and were recovered safely shortly after, with only one receiving minor injuries after an initial assessment.
- 2026 – On 26 February, A United States Customs and Border Protection drone was shot down by the US military 50 miles southeast of El Paso, Texas

== See also ==
- Fog of war
- Fragging
