= Shakhid Baysayev =

Chechen murder victim (1939–2000)

Shakhid Raduyevich Baysayev (Russian: Шахид Радуевич Байсаев; 1939–2000) was a Chechen civilian who was forcibly disappeared (and presumably summarily executed) after being detained by Russian special police forces on the outskirts of Grozny, Chechnya on 2 March 2000. His body was never found.

== Biography ==
Shakhid Baysayev was born in 1939 in Podgornoye, a suburb of Grozny in the Chechen-Ingush Autonomous Soviet Socialist Republic. In 2000 he worked as an auto mechanic at a local company; he was married with five children.

== Disappearance ==
On the morning of March 2, 2000, the Russian OMON paramilitary police forces, who had just suffered significant casualties from a notorious friendly fire incident in this neighbourhood of Grozny, conducted a search operation for suspected rebel fighters who were blamed for the incident. Baysayev was detained on his way to work; a witness described him as being in pain, and his appearance suggested that he had been beaten. Russian troops filmed the detention themselves and later sold the videotape to his wife, Asmart Baysayeva, for $1,000; the video shows Baysayev lying on the ground and being kicked by a soldier before being taken away. She was also given a sketched map purportedly showing where her husband was buried; at the site, she found a fragment of cloth that looked like it came from his coat.

== Investigation ==
After the detention of her husband, Baysayeva immediately complained to the authorities. Despite her continued efforts and the existence of the footage of the detention, however, the Russian authorities failed to carry out an effective investigation, prompting Baysayeva to turn to the European Court of Human Rights (ECHR). On April 5, 2007, in the ruling in the case Baysayeva v. Russia, the European Court ruled that Baysayev's detention was unlawful and that he must be presumed dead. The Court also found it "astonishing" that the servicemen depicted in the video, who were unmasked, have still not been identified by the official investigation.

== See also ==
- List of people who disappeared mysteriously: post-1970
