= Baysayeva v. Russia =

2007 European Court of Human Rights case

Decided 5 April 2007
- Full case name: Baysayeva v Russia
- Case: 74237/01
- ECLI: ECLI:CE:ECHR:2007:0405JUD007423701
- Chamber: First Section

Court composition
- President; C.L. Rozakis
- Judges: L. Loucaides; A. Kovler; E. Steiner; K. Hajiyev; D. Spielmann; S.E. Jebens

Baysayeva v. Russia was an April 5, 2007, European Court of Human Rights ruling in the case of forced disappearance of a Chechen man Shakhid Baysayev, which unanimously held Russia responsible for serious violations of the European Convention on Human Rights. The decision was the latest in a series of judgements against Russia in cases connected to the war in Chechnya.

In its unanimous judgment, the Court made a number of important findings:

- The detention of Baysayev had been unlawful as Russian troops disregarded domestic legal procedures (Article 5 of the European Convention on Human Rights);
- Baysayev must be presumed dead considering circumstances of his detention and the fact that he has been missing for more than six years. The Court held that the Russian government is responsible for his death (Article 2);
- The investigation into the disappearance of Baysayev has been inadequate on numerous accounts (Article 2);
- The suffering of Baysayev's wife as a result of her husband's "disappearance" and the failure of the Russian government to take adequate steps to clarify his fate reaches the threshold of inhuman and degrading treatment (Article 3);
- The refusal of the Russian authorities to submit the documents of criminal investigation file constitutes a failure to assist the Court in its investigation (Article 38).

The panel of seven judges, which included the Russian judge, ordered Russia to pay the applicant Asmart Baysayeva 50,000 Euro in compensation for moral damages. The government was also obliged to take steps to properly investigate Baysayev's disappearance.

At the time of the ruling some 200 similar cases were pending before the Strasbourg court. An estimated 5,000 people have "disappeared" in Chechnya since the start of the Second Chechen War in 1999.
