= Ingush–Chechen fratricide incident =

2006 incident in Russia

- Part of the Second Chechen War
Date	13 September 2006
Location	Border between Chechnya and Ingushetia
Result	8 police personnel killed and ~20 injured

The Ingush–Chechen fratricide incident on 13 September 2006 resulted in the death of eight police officers, and the wounding of a further 20 when Chechen and Ingush policemen fired on each other on the border between the republics.

A motorcade of Chechnya's OMON special police buses was shot at as it was leaving Ingushetia, heading home with an Ingush prisoner. The Chechen OMON Chief of Staff, Buvadi Dukhiyev, was mortally wounded in the shootout.

Isa Kostoyev, a former high-ranking prosecutor and Ingushetian senator in the Federation Council of Russia, issued a call to the Ingushetians to resist Chechen police raids.

== See also ==
- Grozny OMON fratricide incident
