= Grozny OMON friendly fire incident =

2000 incident in Chechnya

Date	March 2, 2000
Location	Grozny, Chechnya
Result	At least 37 OMON officers killed

The Grozny OMON friendly fire incident took place on March 2, 2000, when an OMON (Russian special-purpose police) unit from Podolsk, supported by paramilitary police from the Sverdlovsk Oblast in armored vehicles, opened friendly fire on a motorized column of OMON from Sergiyev Posad (Moscow Oblast), which had just arrived in Chechnya to replace them.

Up to 37 were killed and more than 30 injured in friendly fire between the Russian units. Chechen rebels, allegedly helped by the local militia, were initially blamed for the attack, but independent journalists uncovered the facts, forcing the authorities to admit the truth.

== The ambush ==
The Omonovtsy (OMON officers) from Sergiyev Posad were travelling in a marked convoy of nine trucks, a bus, and a command car, with no protection by armored vehicles and no helicopter cover, to an Interior Ministry forces outpost in the Podgornoye area of the Staropromyslovsky city district of the Chechen capital, Grozny. Their approach had been reported, but they had not been identified, and they were suspected to be either Chechen guerrillas attempting to infiltrate the city or reinforcements for the pro-Moscow Chechen militia, which was also in conflict with the Sverdlovsk police. The Podolsk and Sverdlovsk policemen were waiting to ambush them, and when the column approached an improvised roadblock made with a wrecked bus, it suddenly and without warning came under shoot-to-kill fire, including from heavy machine guns and grenade launchers.

Of the 98 troops in the convoy, at least 22 were reported killed (including the unit's commander, Colonel Dimitry Markelov, killed in the first minutes of the attack) and 31 (or 38) were wounded. At least two members of the Podolsk unit were reported to have been killed by return fire. Moscow officials stated at first that only 12 men had been killed. A day later the chief-of-staff of the Russian military in the North Caucasus said that the death toll had risen to 37. The attack lasted for over an hour and was videotaped by a Russian officer.

== Official whitewash and reprisals in Chechnya ==
Immediately after the incident, Russian Ministry of Internal Affairs (MVD) officials reported that the convoy had been ambushed by Chechen rebels and that the other Russian forces were reinforcements. Baultdin Bakuyev, a Chechen field commander, also took responsibility, saying the attack was an act of revenge for the OMON's atrocities in Chechnya.

Dozens of local men were detained after the incident. Some were killed by Russian OMON troops during the course of the hunt for the alleged Chechen attackers; others were forcibly disappeared. One of the detainees, Shakhid Baysayev, was videotaped. His body has never been found, but he was declared legally dead by the European Court of Human Rights in 2007, presumed to have been killed by Russian forces while in custody.

Interior Minister Vladimir Rushailo attended the funeral of the dead troops and vowed that the rebels responsible for their deaths would be identified and "retribution dealt out accordingly". He added that any Interior Ministry superiors responsible would also be punished. It was soon announced that three suspected rebels alleged to have been involved in the attack had been charged with murder, and foreign journalists received supposed video footage of the attack on the convoy. However, the detained "rebels" were later discharged and the video was said to be footage of a different ambush.

== Criminal negligence trial ==
In a closed trial in 2002, a court acquitted two senior Interior Ministry officers, Major-General Boris Fadeyev (former deputy head of the Moscow Oblast Interior Ministry department and head of the Moscow traffic police) and Colonel Mikhail Levchenko (former head of the command group of the Interior Ministry's force in Chechnya), of criminal negligence. The court instead laid blame posthumously on Colonel Markelov. Major Igor Tikhonov, ex-commander of Podolsk OMON, was excused from the proceedings on health grounds.

== See also ==
- Ingush-Chechen fratricide incident
