= USS Guitarro (SS-363) =

Submarine of the United States

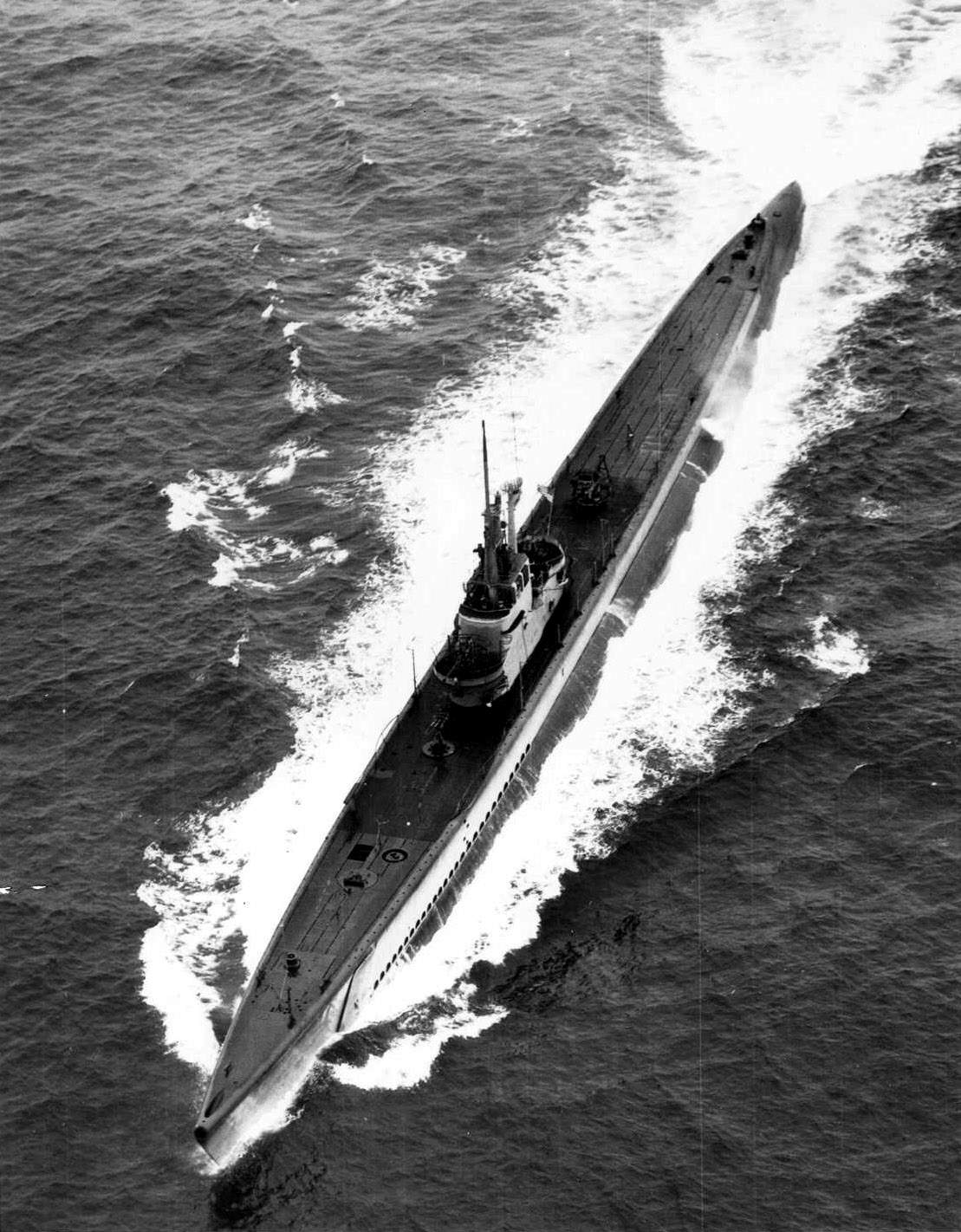
- Guitarro (SS-363) 1945.

History

United States
- Name: USS Guitarro (SS-363)
- Builder: Manitowoc Shipbuilding Company, Manitowoc, Wisconsin
- Laid down: 7 April 1943
- Launched: 29 August 1943
- Commissioned: 26 January 1944
- Decommissioned: 6 December 1945
- Nickname(s): "Gus Gutfish"
- Recommissioned: 6 February 1952
- Decommissioned: 22 September 1953
- Recommissioned: 15 May 1954
- Decommissioned: 7 August 1954
- Stricken: 1 January 1972
- Honors and awards: Four battle stars for World War II service; Navy Unit Commendation
- Fate: Transferred to Turkey, 7 August 1954, sold to Turkey 1 January 1972

Turkey
- Name: TCG Preveze (S 340)
- Acquired: 7 August 1954
- Decommissioned: 4 May 1972
- Fate: Scrapped September 1983

General characteristics
- Class & type: Gato class diesel-electric submarine
- Displacement: 1,525 long tons (1,549 t) surfaced; 2,424 long tons (2,463 t) submerged
- Length: 311 ft 9 in (95.02 m)
- Beam: 27 ft 3 in (8.31 m)
- Draft: 17 ft (5.2 m) maximum
- Propulsion: 4 × General Motors Model 16-278A V16 diesel engines driving electrical generators; 2 × 126-cell Sargo batteries; 4 × high-speed General Electric electric motors with reduction gears; 2 × propellers; 5,400 shp (4.0 MW) surfaced; 2,740 shp (2.0 MW) submerged; 252-cell Gould battery
- Speed: 20.25 knots (23.30 mph; 37.50 km/h) surfaced; 8.75 knots (10.07 mph; 16.21 km/h) submerged
- Range: 11,000 nautical miles (13,000 mi; 20,000 km) surfaced at 10 knots (12 mph; 19 km/h)
- Endurance: 48 hours at 2 knots (2.3 mph; 3.7 km/h) submerged; 75 days on patrol
- Test depth: 300 ft (90 m)
- Complement: 6 officers, 54 enlisted (peace); 80-85 (war)
- Armament: 10 × 21 inch (533 mm) torpedo tubes (six forward, four aft; 24 torpedoes); one 3 in (76 mm)/50 caliber deck gun; two .30 cal (7.62 mm) machineguns

USS Guitarro (SS-363), a Gato-class submarine, was the first ship of the United States Navy to be named for the guitarro.

== Construction and commissioning ==
Guitarro initially was ordered as a unit of the Balao class, but her builder, the Manitowoc Shipbuilding Company, did not receive the drawings for the Balao class from the Electric Boat Company in time to build Guitarro or the submarines USS Golet (SS-361), USS Guavina (SS-362), and USS Hammerhead (SS-364) to the new design, so they were built as Gato-class submarines. Thus, in some references, these four submarines are listed as units of the Balao-class.

Guitarro was launched 26 September 1943 by the Manitowoc Shipbuilding Company at Manitowoc, Wisconsin, sponsored by Mrs. Pauline Palmer McIntire, wife of Vice Admiral Ross T. McIntire, chief of the Bureau of Medicine and Surgery, and commissioned at Manitowoc on 26 January 1944.

== World War II service ==
Guitarro departed Manitowoc for Chicago 13 February, and there she was placed in a floating drydock. Steamer Minnesota towed the drydock to New Orleans, arriving 22 February, and there Guitarro prepared for sea. Steaming from New Orleans 1 March, she operated out of Balboa, Canal Zone, for several weeks and departed for Pearl Harbor 2 April 1944.

=== First war patrol, May – June 1944 ===
Arriving at Pearl Harbor 17 April, Guitarro prepared for her first war patrol off Formosa. She got underway on this duty 7 May 1944. On the night of 30 May the submarine encountered heavily escorted cargo vessel Shisen Maru, and scoring two hits sent her to the bottom. She evaded counter-attacks by the screen ships and headed south for rendezvous with a wolf pack of four submarines under the command of Comdr. F. W. Fenno.

On the night of 2 June Guitarro made a moonlight periscope approach and launched two torpedoes at the frigate Awaji, sinking her immediately. The submarine was then forced down to avoid depth charge, torpedo, and aircraft attacks. She made port at Darwin, Australia, 19 June, and 2 days later sailed for Fremantle, arriving 27 June 1944.

=== Second war patrol, July – September 1944 ===
Departing on her second war patrol 21 July 1944, Guitarro set course for the South China Sea off the west coast of Luzon. She commenced her approach to the lead escorts of a large convoy 7 August and after missing the first target scored three hits on frigate Kusagaki, blowing off her bow and sinking her in a spectacular explosion. The remainder of the convoy escaped as Guitarro eluded the determined attacks of an escort destroyer. She surfaced the next day to sink a small coastal vessel with her deck gun, and then steamed toward Cape Bolinao, where she was to rendezvous with Raton (SS-270) the next day.

Guitarro detected a convoy along the coastline 10 August, maneuvered from beachside, and launched four torpedoes. Tanker Shinei Maru exploded and burned furiously as Guitarro dived to avoid depth charges. The submarine suffered considerable outside damage but no serious injury, and she departed for the vicinity of Cape Calavite with Raton.

While submerged the morning of 21 August Guitarro heard a distant depth charge attack, and soon sighted the smoke of a convoy. Hampered by an unfavorable current and a radically maneuvering convoy, she was unable to mount an attack on two tankers; but a cargo ship turned into her and received four torpedoes as a reward. Passenger-cargo ship Uga Maru (4,433 tons) was sunk, and Guitarro escaped amid a violent depth charge attack.

The versatile submarine, finding the water too shallow for a torpedo attack, surfaced 27 August to engage three coastal tankers with her deck gun and succeeded in sinking Nanshin Maru. Two other tankers were damaged but managed to escape into shoal water. Guitarro returned to Fremantle to complete her patrol 8 September 1944.

=== Third war patrol, October – November 1944 ===
In company with Bream (SS-243), Guitarro departed Fremantle 8 October 1944 for her third war patrol in Philippine waters. As the epochal Battle of Leyte Gulf developed, Guitarro played an important role. She sighted the Japanese Central Force under Admiral Takeo Kurita on the night of 23 – 24 October and tracked the ships through Mindoro Strait, unable to close for an attack. Her contact reports on the force were vital to the success of the ensuing engagements, which by 26 October virtually eliminated the remaining Japanese naval forces in the Pacific.

Guitarro, Bream, and Raton rendezvoused 30 October and the three boats attacked a convoy off Cape Bolinao that night. Unable to score any hits until the next day, Guitarro managed to work her way inside the screen and fire no less than nine torpedoes at 08:47. She observed one cargo ship break in half and was rocked by a tremendous explosion from another direct hit on an ammunition ship. Guitarro was driven down 5 feet (1.5 m) by the force of the explosion, prompting Comdr. Haskins to report: "The Commanding Officer never wishes to hit an ammunition ship any closer than that one." She teamed up with Bream and Ray (SS-271) 4 November to sink passenger-cargo ship Kagu Maru. After Bream's initial attack, Guitarro added four hits before diving to avoid escort vessels.

Remaining off western Luzon, Guitarro and her wolf pack next encountered heavy cruiser Kumano in convoy. Damaged in the Battle off Samar, the cruiser had repaired at Manila and was en route to Japan when the submarines struck. Guitarro fired nine torpedoes and gained three hits, but failed to sink the cruiser. Pounded by torpedoes from the other boats, Kumano was finally stopped, towed ashore by one of her sisters, and eventually finished off by carrier aircraft 25 November 1944. Guitarro, meanwhile, had returned to Fremantle 16 November. For her outstanding performance on her first three patrols, the submarine was awarded the Navy Unit Commendation.

=== Fourth and fifth war patrols, December 1944 – May 1945 ===
Guitarro departed Fremantle 11 December 1944 on her fourth war patrol, transiting Lombok Strait 17 December to patrol the South China Sea. After putting in at Mios Woendi 17 January 1945 for repairs, she made an attack with undetermined results on a convoy off Cape Batagan. On 1 March 1945, she was operating on the surface in heavy fog when at 01:10 H Time she sighted a torpedo at a distance of 100 yards (91 m) which passed 100 yards (91 m) ahead of her. With strong indications of nearby U.S. SD and SJ submarine radars, she challenged what she presumed was a nearby U.S. submarine for 45 minutes via SJ radar signals beginning at 01:25 H Time before receiving a reply and exchanging recognition signals. The other submarine never identified itself, but the torpedo had come from its direction. Although unable to prove conclusively that they had been either in contact with or fired upon by another U.S. submarine, Guitarro′s crew concluded that they had nearly been the victims of a friendly fire incident. Finding targets scarce in her patrol area, Guitarro returned to Fremantle on 15 March 1945.

Guitarro again put out to sea 9 April 1945 on her fifth war patrol, and was unsuccessfully attacked by aircraft and a patrol boat in Lombok Strait. She then made her way to the northeast coast of Sumatra, where she engaged in a new mission, the laying of mines, off Berhala Island. After an uneventful patrol astride the shipping lanes between Borneo and Singapore, Guitarro anchored off Saipan 27 May 1945. Next day she departed for Pearl Harbor, where she arrived 8 June. Arriving at San Francisco 18 June 1945, Guitarro decommissioned at Mare Island 6 December and was placed in reserve.

== 1952-1953 service and Fleet Snorkel conversion ==
Guitarro recommissioned 6 February 1952, and after overhaul at San Diego engaged in a series of training exercises off the coast until 10 September 1953. She again decommissioned 22 September 1953 and underwent a Fleet Snorkel conversion to snorkel equipment at Mare Island Shipyard. She was featured in the 1953 film "The 49th man".

== Transfer to Turkey as TCG Preveze (S 340) ==
Guitarro subsequently recommissioned 15 May 1954 and commenced the training of Turkish sailors prior to transfer to Turkey under the Military Defense Assistance Program. Guitarro decommissioned and was loaned to Turkey 7 August 1954. She was commissioned as TCG Preveze, the first submarine on that name. Originally designated S 22, she was redesignated S 340 in 1965. On 1 January 1972 the submarine was formally sold to Turkey. She was decommissioned on 4 May 1972, renamed Ceryan Botu (No. 4), and served as a battery charging hulk until scrapped in September 1983. Her sail was preserved at Gölcük Naval Base until the earthquake of 17 August 1999.

== Awards ==
Guitarro was awarded four battle stars and a Navy Unit Commendation for her service in World War II. Her first, second, third, and fifth war patrols were designated "successful."
