= USS Golet =

Submarine of the United States

Coordinates: 41°4′N 141°31′E

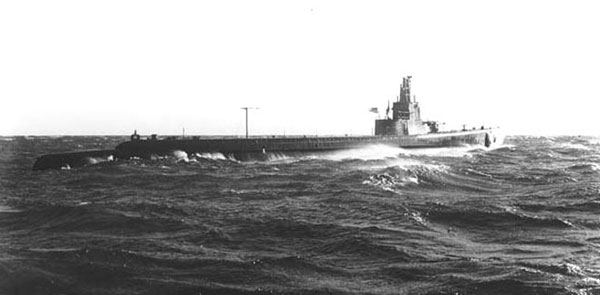
- USS Golet (SS-361)

History

United States
- Name: USS Golet
- Namesake: Golet, an alternative name for the Dolly Varden trout
- Builder: Manitowoc Shipbuilding Company, Manitowoc, Wisconsin
- Laid down: 27 January 1943
- Launched: 1 August 1943
- Commissioned: 30 November 1943
- Fate: Sunk by Japanese vessels northwest of Honshū, 14 June 1944. All 82 crew lost

General characteristics
- Class & type: Gato-class diesel-electric submarine
- Displacement: 1,525 tons (1,549 t) surfaced; 2,424 tons (2,460 t) submerged
- Length: 311 ft 9 in (95.02 m)
- Beam: 27 ft 3 in (8.31 m)
- Draft: 17 ft 0 in (5.18 m) maximum
- Propulsion: 4 × General Motors Model 16-278A V16 diesel engines driving electrical generators; 2 × 126-cell Sargo batteries; 4 × high-speed General Electric electric motors with reduction gears; 2 × propellers; 5,400 shp (4.0 MW) surfaced; 2,740 shp (2.0 MW) submerged; 252-cell Gould battery
- Speed: 20.25 knots (23.30 mph; 37.50 km/h) surfaced; 8.75 knots (10.07 mph; 16.21 km/h) submerged
- Range: 11,000 nautical miles (13,000 mi; 20,000 km) surfaced at 10 knots (12 mph; 19 km/h)
- Endurance: 48 hours at 2 knots (2.3 mph; 3.7 km/h) submerged; 75 days on patrol
- Test depth: 300 ft (90 m)
- Complement: 6 officers, 54 enlisted (peace); 80-85 (war)
- Armament: 10 × 21-inch (533 mm) torpedo tubes (six forward, four aft; 24 torpedoes); one 3 in (76 mm)/50 caliber deck gun; two .30 cal (7.62 mm) machineguns

USS Golet (SS-361), a Gato-class submarine, was the only ship of the United States Navy to be named for the golet, a California trout.

== Construction and commissioning ==
Golet initially was ordered as a unit of the Balao class, but her builder, the Manitowoc Shipbuilding Company, did not receive the drawings for the Balao class from the Electric Boat Company in time to build Golet or the submarines USS Guavina (SS-362), USS Guitarro (SS-363), and USS Hammerhead (SS-364) to the new design, so they were built as Gato-class submarines. Thus, in some references, these four submarines are listed as units of the Balao-class.

War bond purchases by the people of Shreveport, Louisiana, and Cadddo Parish, Louisiana, funded Golet′s construction. Her keel was laid down by the Manitowoc Shipbuilding Company of Manitowoc, Wisconsin. She was launched on 1 August 1943, sponsored by Mrs. Wiley, wife of United States Senator Alexander Wiley of Wisconsin, and commissioned on 30 November 1943.

== Operational history ==
Golet departed Manitowoc 19 December 1943 in a floating dry dock, traveling via the Illinois Waterway and the Mississippi River for New Orleans, Louisiana, arriving 28 December. After shakedown training at Panama and final battle practice in Hawaiian waters Golet departed Pearl Harbor on 18 March 1944 for her maiden war patrol.

=== First Patrol: 18 March 1944 ===
Golet departed Pearl Harbor on 18 March 1944 for her maiden war patrol off the Kurile Islands chain, Southern Hokkaidō and Eastern Honshū, Japan. Severe combinations of fog, rain, and ice were encountered and only one ship worth a torpedo came into view. This enemy proved too fast for Golet to close to torpedo range; she returned to Midway Island on 3 May 1944.

=== Second Patrol: 28 May 1944 ===
Lieutenant Commander James S. Clark took command of Golet, departed Midway Island on 28 May 1944 to patrol off northern Honshū, Japan, and was never heard from again.

Golet had been scheduled to depart her area on 5 July and was expected at Midway Island about 12 July or 13 July. She failed to acknowledge a message sent her on 9 July and was presumed lost 26 July 1944.

=== Fate: 14 June 1944 ===
Japanese antisubmarine records available after the war revealed that Golet was the probable victim of a Japanese antisubmarine attack made 14 June 1944. These records mention that the attack brought up cork, rafts, and other debris and a heavy pool of oil, all evidence of the sinking of a submarine.

== Commemoration ==
=== Commissioning Crew: 30 November 1943 ===
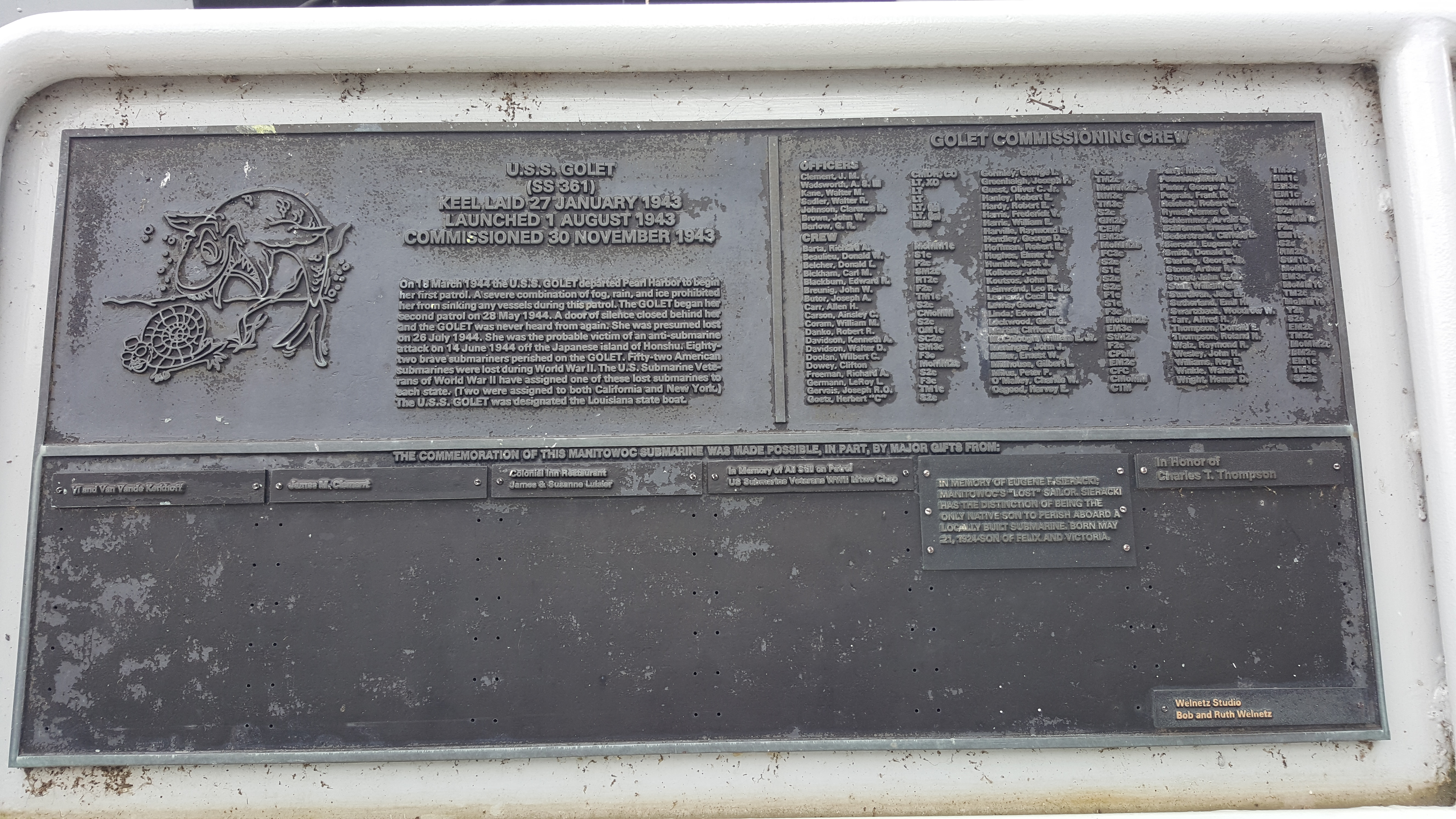
U.S.S. Golet (SS-361) commissioning crew and history plaque at the Wisconsin Maritime Museum.

A plaque at the Wisconsin Maritime Museum in Manitowoc, Wisconsin, lists the members of Golet′s commissioning crew on 30 November 1943 and provides a brief history of Golet′s career.

=== Memorial: 9 March 2013 ===
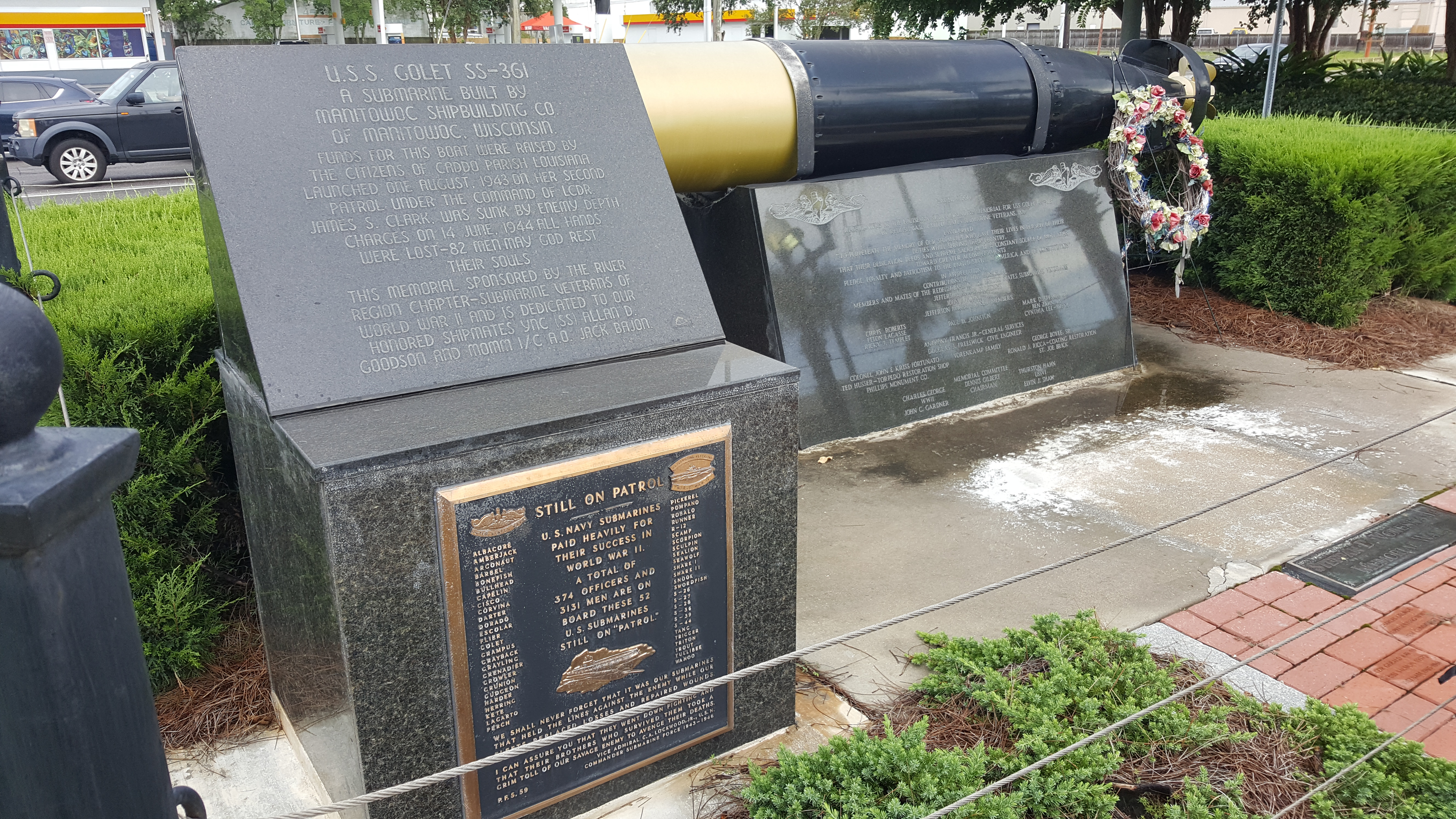
U.S.S. Golet Memorial at Metairie in Orleans Parish, Louisiana

A memorial to Golet and her crew is located in Metairie, Louisiana. Its inscription reads:

U.S.S. Golet SS-361 A submarine built by Manitowoc shipbuilding Co of Manitowoc, Wisconsin. Funds for this boat were raised by the citizens of Caddo Parish Louisiana. Launched one August 1943, her second patrol under the command of LCDR. James S. Clark was sunk by enemy depth charges on 14 June 1944. All hands were lost – 82 men. May God rest their souls.

The memorial also lists her crew at the time of her sinking, all of whom were lost.

== See also ==
- List of submarines of the United States Navy
- List of U.S. Navy losses in World War II
