= USS Guavina =

Submarine of the United States

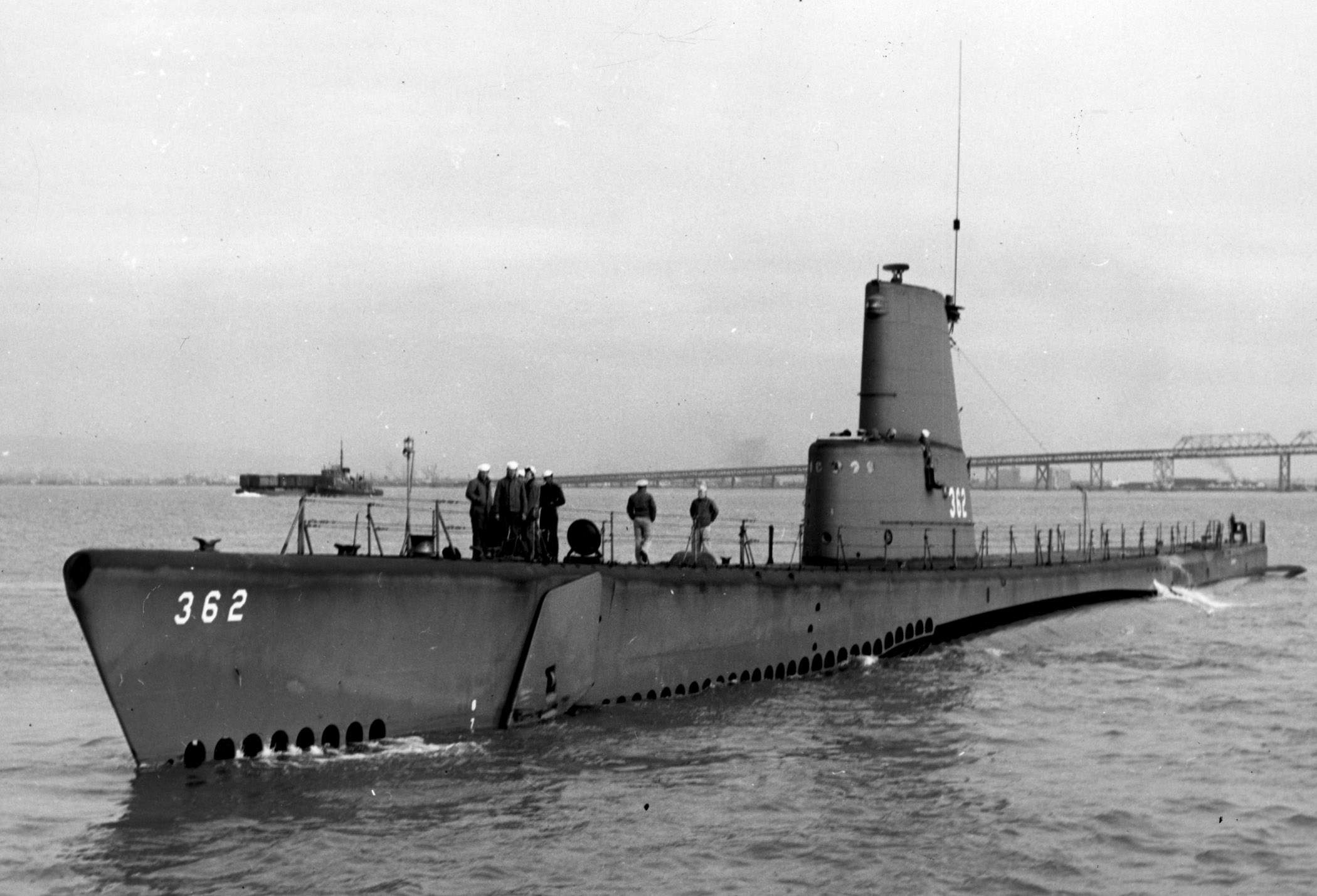
- In 1951 Guavina (SS-362) was equipped with an experimental searchlight sonar.

History

United States
- Builder: Manitowoc Shipbuilding Company, Manitowoc, Wisconsin
- Laid down: 3 March 1943
- Launched: 29 August 1943
- Commissioned: 23 December 1943
- Decommissioned: 8 June 1946
- Recommissioned: 1 February 1950
- Decommissioned: 27 March 1959
- Stricken: 30 June 1967
- Fate: Sunk as a target off Cape Henry, 14 November 1967

General characteristics
- Class & type: Gato-class diesel-electric submarine
- Displacement: 1,525 long tons (1,549 t) surfaced; 2,424 long tons (2,463 t) submerged
- Length: 311 ft 9 in (95.02 m)
- Beam: 27 ft 3 in (8.31 m)
- Draft: 17 ft 0 in (5.18 m) maximum
- Propulsion: 4 × General Motors Model 16-278A V16 diesel engines driving electrical generators; 2 × 126-cell Sargo batteries; 4 × high-speed General Electric electric motors with reduction gears; 2 × propellers; 5,400 shp (4.0 MW) surfaced; 2,740 shp (2.0 MW) submerged; 2 × 126-cell Gould batteries
- Speed: 20.25 knots (23.30 mph; 37.50 km/h) surfaced; 8.75 knots (10.07 mph; 16.21 km/h) submerged
- Range: 11,000 nautical miles (13,000 mi; 20,000 km) surfaced at 10 knots (12 mph; 19 km/h)
- Endurance: 48 hours at 2 knots (2.3 mph; 3.7 km/h) submerged; 75 days on patrol
- Test depth: 300 ft (90 m)
- Complement: 6 officers, 54 enlisted (peace); 80-85 (war)
- Armament: 10 × 21 inch (533 mm) torpedo tubes (six forward, four aft; 24 torpedoes); one 3 in (76 mm)/50 caliber deck gun; two .30 cal (7.62 mm) machineguns

USS Guavina (SS/SSO/AGSS/AOSS-362), a Gato-class submarine, was a ship of the United States Navy named for the guavina, a fish which may reach a length of 2 feet (0.6 m) indigenous to the West Indies and the Atlantic coasts of Central America and Mexico.

== Construction and commissioning ==
Guavina initially was ordered as a unit of the Balao class, but her builder, the Manitowoc Shipbuilding Company, did not receive the drawings for the Balao class from the Electric Boat Company in time to build Guavina or the submarines USS Golet (SS-361), USS Guitarro (SS-363), and USS Hammerhead (SS-364) to the new design, so they were built as Gato-class submarines. Thus, in some references, these four submarines are listed as units of the Balao-class.

Guavina was launched by the Manitowoc Shipbuilding Company at Manitowoc, Wisconsin, on 29 August 1943, sponsored by Miss Marie Roen, and commissioned on 23 December 1943.

== Operational history ==
After shakedown, Guavina was towed down the Mississippi in a floating drydock by tug Minnesota, reaching New Orleans 24 January 1944. She underwent training exercises at New Orleans and at Balboa, C.Z., before reaching Pearl Harbor 5 April to prepare for her first war patrol.

=== First war patrol, April – May 1944 ===
Guavina sailed 6 April 1944, on her first offensive cruise. On 22 April she sank by gunfire two trawlers loaded with lumber and cargo and 3 days later torpedoed a large "maru". Her first big kill came 26 April when she sent torpedoes into two of the merchant ships in a seven-ship convoy. One of them, Noshiro Maru, sank almost immediately after three tremendous explosions. The second maru also exploded, although persistent depth charging prevented Guavina from staying around to observe the sinking.

After standing lifeguard duty off Wake Island during air strikes 21 May – 26 May, the submarine returned to Majuro Atoll 28 May. Her aggressive first patrol forecast even greater service for the nation.

=== Second war patrol, June – July 1944 ===
On her second war patrol (20 June – 31 July) Guavina sailed from Majuro to Brisbane, Australia, sinking 1 ship and rescuing 12 downed aviators. At 13:24 on 3 July she picked up an obviously important ship with four escorts, and trailed her to get in attack position. Finally at 03:48 the next morning Guavina launched four torpedoes, three of which hit and set off a tremendous explosion. The sub spent the next 3 hours running silent and deep to avoid a total of 18 depth charges and 8 aerial bombs, surfacing at 06:43 to observe the wreckage of Tama Maru (3,052 tons). A total of 321 troops, two gunners and eleven crewmen were killed. While on lifeguard duty off Yap 2 July to 21 July, Guavina picked up a total of 12 downed B-24 airmen, and then headed for Brisbane via Seeadler Harbor, Admiralty Islands.

=== Third and fourth war patrols, August – December 1944 ===
Guavina's third war patrol (16 August – 29 September) took her along the Philippine coast off Mindanao. On 31 August she opened fire on two small coastwise steamers, chasing them almost onto the beach before finally destroying them. Then, after a period of lifeguard duty, on 15 September Guavina sighted a large ship, later revealed to be a transport at anchor. Closing for the kill she loosed a salvo of three torpedoes. Only one hit, so she fired three more, scoring twice. Although the target was enveloped in fire and smoke, it still did not sink; so Guavina administered the final fatal blow with a spread of two torpedoes which totally disintegrated the target.

Departing Brisbane 27 October, Guavina headed to the South China Sea for her fourth war patrol. A night surface attack 15 November netted her a large maru; one torpedo hit caused a violent explosion, as the maru apparently was carrying aviation gasoline; a second fish sent through the fiery waters finished her. Tanker Down Maru fell victim to Guavina 22 November, and a second tanker anchored nearby met the same fate the following day. During the final month she searched for additional victims. Then finding unfavorable attack conditions, she sailed for port, making Perth, Australia 27 December.

=== Fifth and sixth war patrols, January – May 1945 ===
Working first with Pampanito and then with Becuna and Blenny, Guavina spent her fifth war patrol (23 January – 5 March 1945) again in the South China Sea. The value of the coordinated attack group was quickly proved as on 6 February Guavina was directed in for the kill by Pampanito and sank the 6,892-ton tanker Taigyo Maru. To avoid the subsequent depth charging, Guavina pulled the unusual maneuver of lying on the bottom near the stern of her recent victim.

She returned Pampanito's favor the following day by providing a diversion in the form of four flares from her "Buck Rogers" gun as her sister sub maneuvered for a successful shot. Guavina sank another tanker, the 8,673-ton Eiyo Maru, 20 February, and suffered one of the severest depth chargings of the war. With no room to run, she lay on the bottom at 130 feet (40 m) while Japanese escorts and planes dropped a total of 98 depth charges and bombs during the next 7 hours. Battered but undaunted, she sailed to Subic Bay in the Philippines, arriving 5 March for a badly needed refit.

On her sixth war patrol (21 March – 8 May) Guavina worked in coordination with Rock, Cobia, and Blenny in the South China Sea. A lack of targets resulted in her returning empty-handed, but she did rescue five B-25 crew members 28 March before returning to Pearl Harbor 8 May. With six successful war patrols behind her she proceeded to the West Coast for overhaul. She departed San Francisco for Pearl Harbor 6 August, but with the end of the war returned to the States. Guavina then put in at Mare Island and was placed in commission, in reserve, and Decommissioned 8 June 1946.

=== Post-war service as submarine tanker ===
From March 1949, Guavina underwent extensive overhaul and modification under project SCB 39 for conversion to a submarine oiler at Mare Island, and was even equipped with a snorkel. Guavina recommissioned in the active fleet as SSO-362 1 February 1950 at Mare Island. After operations along the West Coast, she sailed to Norfolk via Balboa and San Juan 24 July to 25 August. Further operations out of Norfolk were followed by overhaul at Philadelphia and on 29 January 1951, Guavina reported to Key West, her new homeport.

Operating out of Key West, Guavina cruised to the Caribbean Sea and up the East Coast to Nova Scotia to test the concepts of fueling seaplanes and other submarines, although most of her work was in the Gulf of Mexico and the Straits of Florida. After overhaul at Philadelphia 18 April to 26 July 1952, Guavina was redesignated AGSS-362. Two more years of operations along the East Coast and in the Gulf were followed by a second extensive overhaul at Philadelphia. To aid refueling, Guavina gained a large, raised platform over the after torpedo room, which was soon dubbed the "flight deck".

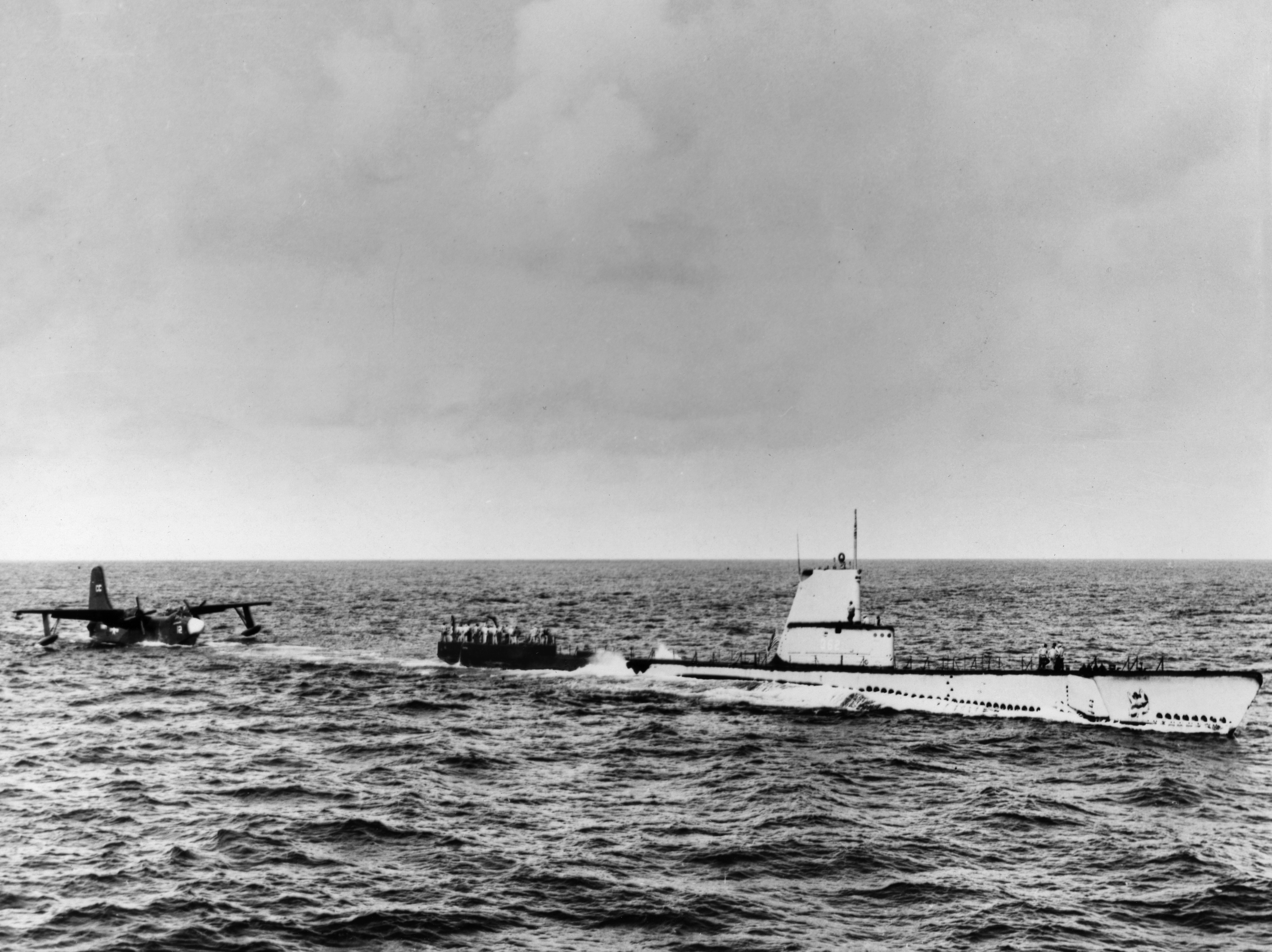
Guavina (AGSS-362), refueling a P5M Marlin flying boat off Norfolk, VA. in 1955. It was planned to use submarines to refuel the new jet-powered P6M SeaMaster flying boats. As part of this program Guavina was converted to carry 160,000 gallons of aviation fuel.

And a flight deck it soon became as in January 1956 Guavina began testing the concept of mobile support of seaplanes from a submarine oiler. After an initial 2-week trial period, Guavina and a variety of seaplanes carried out refueling development for most of 1956. Sailing from Charleston 18 September, the submarine headed for the Mediterranean Sea. After her 2-month deployment there with the 6th Fleet and Patrol Squadron 56, Guavina returned to Key West 1 December, then put into Charleston for overhaul.

Emerging from overhaul 12 July 1957 with the new designation AOSS-362, Guavina resumed her established pattern of testing various applications of submarine oiler and seaplane refueling concepts, operating principally in the Caribbean. Ranging along the coast from New London to Bermuda, she also engaged in antisubmarine exercises and other peacetime training missions.

=== Grounding ===
On 16 February 1958 Guavina was operating in the Bahamas and dropped anchor off the island of San Salvador. Overnight, high winds and heavy seas pushed her aground. Guavina spent several days stuck hard aground in the shallow sandy surf of San Salvador. She eventually was freed by the combined efforts of the salvage and rescue ships USS Petrel (ASR-14) and USS Escape (ARS-6) and the ocean tugs USS Shakori (ATF-162) and USS Allegheny (ATA-179).

== Decommissioning and disposal ==
Guavina arrived at the Charleston Navy Yard in Charleston, South Carolina, on 4 January 1959, and decommissioned there on 27 March 1959, going into reserve. She served as a training ship for United States Naval Reserve personnel in the 5th Naval District at Baltimore, Maryland, until struck from the Navy List on 30 June 1967 and sunk as a target by the submarine Cubera (SS-347) off Cape Henry, Virginia, with a Mark 16-1 torpedo.

== Honors and awards ==
Guavina received five battle stars for World War II service.

== Notable Veterans ==
Maxime Faget, the NASA engineer responsible for the design of the Mercury spacecraft, and who contributed to the design of the Gemini and Apollo spacecraft and the Space Shuttle served on Guavina during the Second World War.
