= Manitowoc Shipbuilding Company =

Shipyard in Manitowoc, Wisconsin, United States

Coordinates: 44.098501°N 87.667438°W

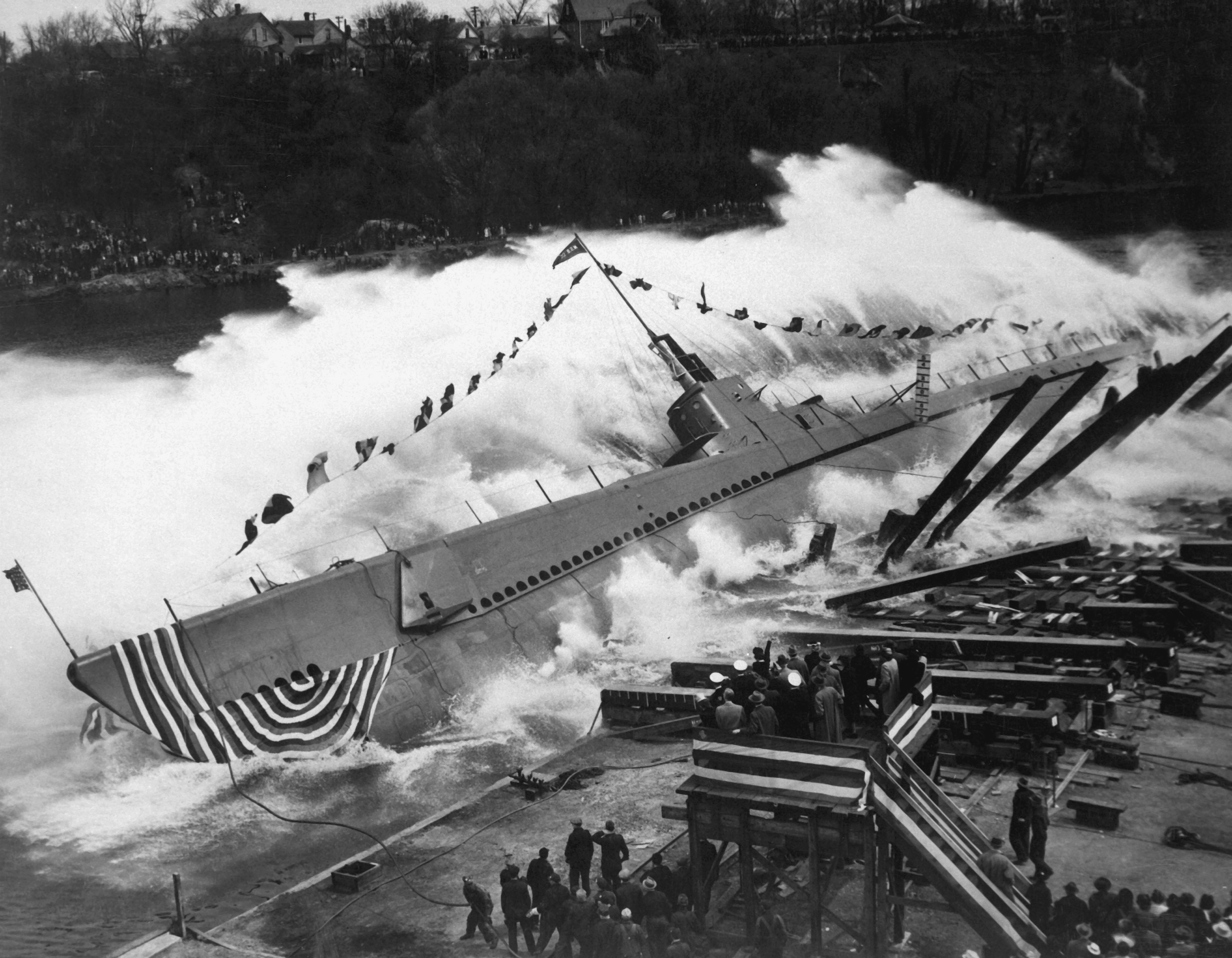
Launching of USS Robalo 9 May 1943, at Manitowoc Shipbuilding Co., Manitowoc, WI.

Manitowoc Shipbuilding Company, located in Manitowoc, Wisconsin, was a major shipbuilder for the Great Lakes. It was founded in 1902, with the purchase of the "Burger & Burger Shipyard," a predecessor to The Burger Boat Company, and made mainly steel ferries and ore haulers. During World War II, it built submarines, tank landing craft (LCTs), and self-propelled fuel barges called "YOs". Employment peaked during the military years at 7000 employees. The shipyard closed in 1968, when Manitowoc Company bought Bay Shipbuilding Company and moved their shipbuilding operation to Sturgeon Bay.

== Submarine building program ==
Shipyard President Charles C. West contacted the Bureau of Construction and Repair in 1939 to propose building destroyers at Manitowoc and transporting them through the Chicago River, Chicago Sanitary and Ship Canal, Illinois River, and Mississippi River in a floating drydock towed by the tugboat Minnesota. After evaluating the plan and surveying the shipyard, the Navy suggested building submarines instead. A contract for ten submarines was awarded on 9 September 1940. The Navy paid for lift machinery on Chicago's Western Avenue railroad bridge to clear a submarine. The 15-foot-draft submarines entered a floating drydock on the Illinois River to get through the 9-foot-deep Chain of Rocks Channel near the confluence of the Mississippi and Missouri Rivers. Submarines left the drydock at New Orleans and reinstalled periscope shears, periscopes, and radar masts which had been removed to clear bridges over the river.

Manitowoc had never built a submarine before, but the first was completed 228 days before the contract delivery date. Contracts were awarded for additional submarines, and the last submarine was completed by the date scheduled for the 10th submarine of the original contract. Total production of 28 submarines was completed for $5,190,681 less than the contract price.

SS-361 through SS-364 were initially ordered as Balao-class. However, they were completed by Manitowoc as Gatos, due to an unavoidable delay in Electric Boat's development of Balao-class drawings. Manitowoc was a follow yard to Electric Boat, and was dependent on them for designs and drawings.

== List of fleet submarines built by Manitowoc ==
The following is a complete list of the submarines built by Manitowoc during WW II. Years listed reflect launch dates.

14 of 77 Gato-class:

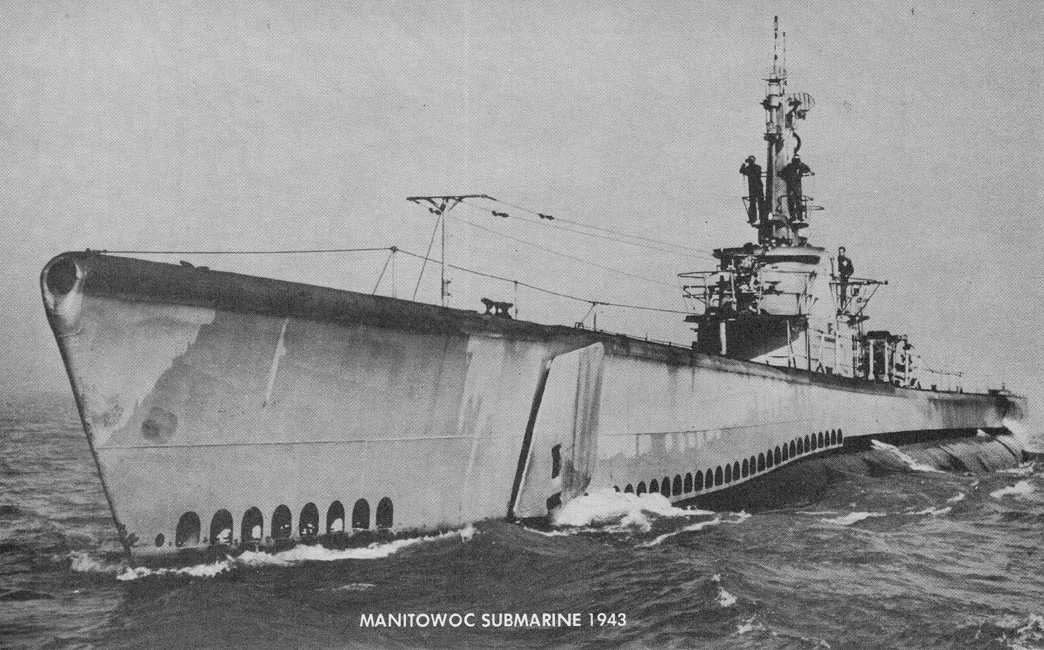
One of the 28 Manitowoc submarines produced, used in the Pacific Theater, from 2 April 1943 to the end of the war, on 15 August 1945. Two lookouts are posted next to the periscope shears. Her bow planes are rigged in, main gun visible on deck aft. Notice the limber holes and saddle ballast tanks.

- 1942 − USS Peto − sank 7 ships in 10 World War II Pacific patrols
- 1942 − USS Pogy − sank 16 ships in 10 World War II Pacific patrols
- 1942 − USS Pompon − sank 3 ships in 9 World War II Pacific patrols
- 1942 − USS Puffer − sank 8 ships in 9 World War II Pacific patrols
- 1942 − USS Rasher − sank 18 ships in 8 World War II Pacific patrols, 2nd highest tonnage sunk by a US submarine during the war
- 1943 − USS Raton − sank 9 ships in 8 World War II Pacific patrols
- 1943 − USS Ray − sank 14 ships in 8 World War II Pacific patrols
- 1943 − USS Redfin − sank 5 ships in 7 World War II Pacific patrols
- 1943 − USS Robalo − 3 World War II Pacific patrols
- 1943 − USS Rock − sank 1 ship in 6 World War II Pacific patrols
- 1943 − USS Golet − 2 World War II Pacific patrols
- 1943 − USS Guavina − sank 5 ships in 6 World War II Pacific patrols
- 1943 − USS Guitarro − sank 6 ships in 5 World War II Pacific patrols
- 1943 − USS Hammerhead − sank 11 ships in 7 World War II Pacific patrols

14 of 120 Balao-class:

- 1943 − USS Hardhead − sank 7 ships in 6 World War II Pacific patrols
- 1944 − USS Hawkbill − sank 6 ships in 5 World War II Pacific patrols
- 1944 − USS Icefish − sank 2 ships in 5 World War II Pacific patrols
- 1944 − USS Jallao − sank 2 ships in 4 World War II Pacific patrols
- 1944 − USS Kete − sank 3 ships in 2 World War II Pacific patrols
- 1944 − USS Kraken − 4 World War II Pacific patrols
- 1944 − USS Lagarto − sank 3 ships in 2 World War II Pacific patrols
- 1944 − USS Lamprey − 3 World War II Pacific patrols
- 1944 − USS Lizardfish − 2 World War II Pacific patrols
- 1944 − USS Loggerhead − 2 World War II Pacific patrols
- 1944 − USS Macabi − 1 World War II Pacific patrol
- 1944 − USS Mapiro
- 1944 − USS Menhaden
- 1945 − USS Mero

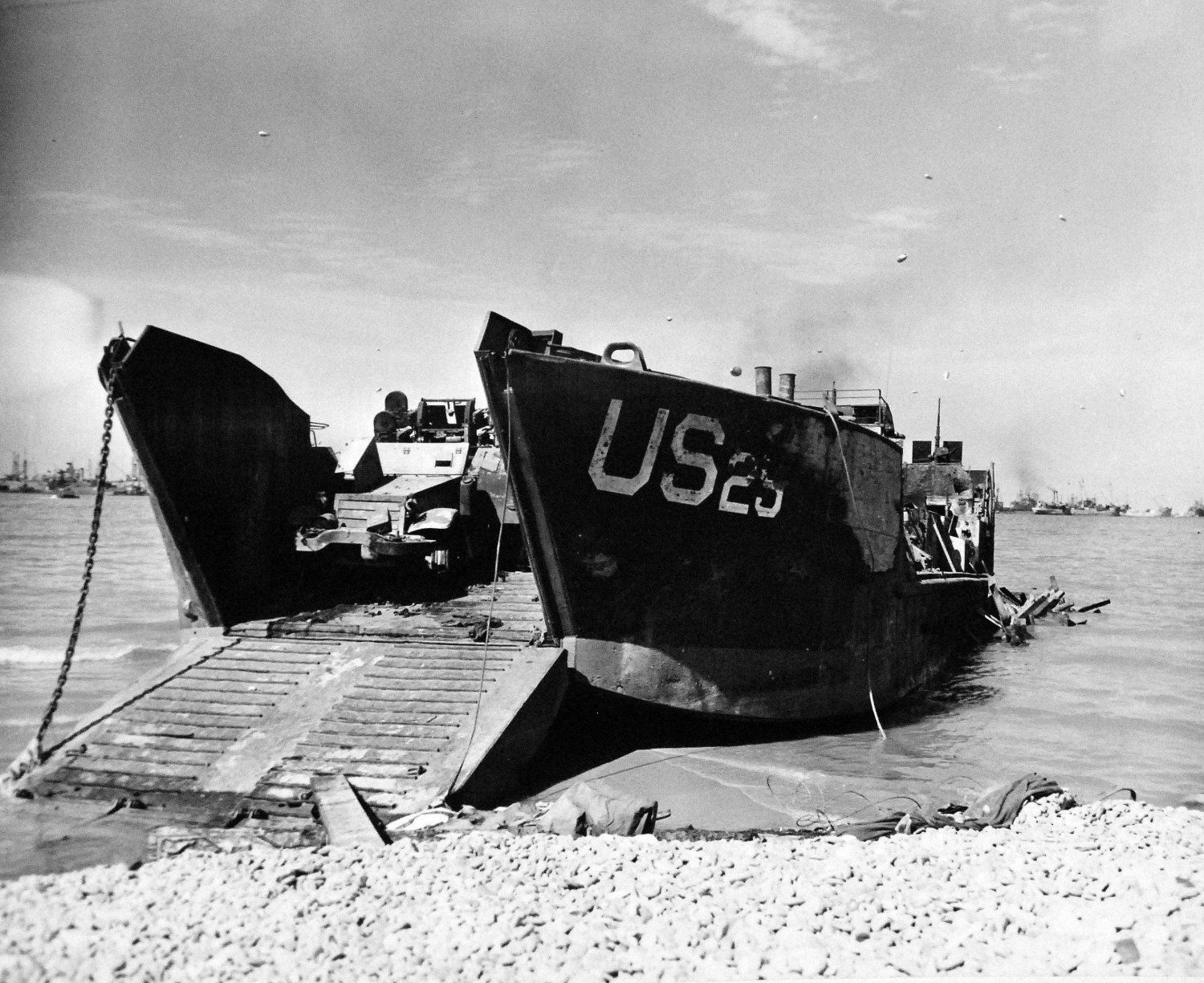
Landing Craft Tank LCT(5)-25 built by Manitowoc, abandoned at Normandy with a destroyed half-track in June 1944

== Landing Craft Tanks ==
Manitowoc Shipbuilding built 36 Landing Craft Tanks (LCTs). LCT were not given ship names. Many were used for the Invasion of Normandy from 6 to 25 June 1944. Of the 36 LCTs built by Manitowoc, 9 sank in action. Landing Craft Tank has a: displacement of 285 tons, length of 114' 2", beam of 32' 8", draft of 3' 6", top speed of 10 kts., a range of 700 nautical miles, held 1 officer and 10 enlisted men, a cargo capacity of 150 short tons, armament of two single 20mm AA guns, and two .50 cal. machine guns. Propulsion was from three Grey Marine 6-71 Diesel engines, driving three propellers with 675 shp. Power was from one 20 kW Diesel engine.

== World War I ==
For World War I and post-war support, Manitowoc Shipbuilding built cargo ships from 1917 to 1920. The ships were contracted under the United States Shipping Board and classed as Design 1044. The ships were: 2,124 to 2,711 DWT. Most of these ships were named after lakes. The SS Coquina renamed SS Cynthia Olson was sunk by Japanese submarine I-26 on December 7, 1941. Other notable ships: USS Tide (SP-953), SS Alabama, USCGC Dione USS Surveyor (1917), USS Stratford (AP-41), SS Indigirka and SS City of Milwaukee. Post-World War I Manitowoc built: scows, tugboats, barges, a ferry, three patrol boats for the U.S. Coast Guard, and the Presidential yacht USS Potomac (AG-25) (1934).

== Post-World War II ==
After World War II, Manitowoc Shipbuilding continued to build ships, barges and dredges, until the shipyard closed in 1972. In 1947, Manitowoc built a 900-ton floating drydock for Buffalo, New York. Notable post war ships: MV Saginaw (1953) and SS Edward L. Ryerson (1960).

== See also ==
- USS Potomac (AG-25)
- The Manitowoc Company - successor
