= USS Lizardfish =

Submarine of the United States

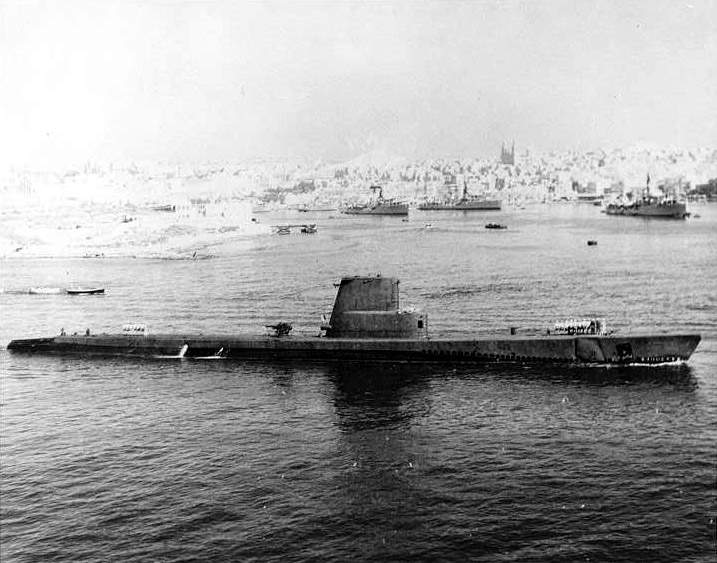
- Ex-Lizardfish, Italian Evangelista Torricelli, c. 1960.

History

United States
- Name: USS Lizardfish (SS-373)
- Builder: Manitowoc Shipbuilding Company, Manitowoc, Wisconsin
- Laid down: 14 March 1944
- Launched: 16 July 1944
- Commissioned: 30 December 1944
- Decommissioned: 24 June 1946
- Recommissioned: 9 September 1959
- Decommissioned: 9 January 1960
- Stricken: 15 July 1978
- Fate: Transferred to Italy, 9 January 1960, sold to Italy 15 July 1979

Italy
- Name: Evangelista Torricelli (S 512)
- Acquired: 9 January 1960
- Out of service: 1976
- Fate: Sold for scrap, 1976

General characteristics
- Class & type: Balao class diesel-electric submarine
- Displacement: 1,526 tons (1,550 t) surfaced; 2,424 tons (2,463 t) submerged
- Length: 311 ft 9 in (95.02 m)
- Beam: 27 ft 3 in (8.31 m)
- Draft: 16 ft 10 in (5.13 m) maximum
- Propulsion: 4 × General Motors Model 16-278A V16 diesel engines driving electrical generators; 2 × 126-cell Sargo batteries; 4 × high-speed General Electric electric motors with reduction gears; 2 × propellers; 5,400 shp (4.0 MW) surfaced; 2,740 shp (2.0 MW) submerged
- Speed: 20.25 knots (38 km/h) surfaced; 8.75 knots (16 km/h) submerged
- Range: 11,000 nautical miles (20,000 km) surfaced at 10 knots (19 km/h)
- Endurance: 48 hours at 2 knots (3.7 km/h) submerged; 75 days on patrol
- Test depth: 400 ft (120 m)
- Complement: 10 officers, 70–71 enlisted
- Armament: 10 × 21-inch (533 mm) torpedo tubes; 6 forward, 4 aft; 24 torpedoes; 1 × 5-inch (127 mm) / 25 caliber deck gun; Bofors 40 mm and Oerlikon 20 mm cannon

USS Lizardfish (SS-373), a Balao-class submarine, was a boat of the United States Navy named for the lizardfish, a slender marine fish having a scaly, lizard-like head and large mouth.

== Construction and commissioning ==
Lizardfish was laid down on 14 March 1944 by the Manitowoc Shipbuilding Company at Manitowoc, Wisconsin; launched on 16 July 1944, sponsored by Mrs. Lansdale G. Sasscer; wife of Congressman Sasscer of Maryland; and commissioned on 30 December 1944.

== Operational history ==
=== World War II ===
Lizardfish departed the Manitowoc River 20 January 1945 for Lockport, IL, where she was loaded on a floating drydock and towed down the Mississippi River. She arrived at Algiers, La., 1 February and put to sea 5 days later for the Panama Canal and Pearl Harbor, arriving 23 March.

Lizardfish left Pearl Harbor on her first war patrol 9 April 1945. Topping off with fuel at Saipan on the 21st, she set course for the South China Sea. The submarine maintained a thorough close-in patrol of Indochina between 30 April and 18 May, but contacted no enemy traffic. From 23 to 28 May, a similar painstaking patrol in the Java Sea produced no enemy contacts. Completing this arduous patrol, Lizardfish arrived Fremantle, Australia, on 2 June.

Lizardfish got underway 28 June 1945 on her second patrol in the Java and South China Seas. Throughout this patrol, the submarine sought out targets and carried destruction to the enemy in confined harbors, straits, and anchorages. After careful submerged reconnaissance, she made two daring daylight gun attacks within range of shore batteries.

On 5 July, she entered the coral-fringed bay of Chelukan Bawang, Bali, discovering four landing barges, a 250-ton sea truck, and a 100-ton submarine chaser, all heavily camouflaged. She made a submerged run and sank No.1-class submarine chaser Cha-37, then battle-surfaced and opened her deck guns. Her 5-inch (130 mm) salvos started a gasoline fire which destroyed a nest of four landing barges. She then demolished a boat shed and ripped apart the bow of a sea truck inside. Leaving this target in a flaming mass, she headed out to sea.

On 19 July near Sunda Strait, she was patrolling southward along the western shore when her crew sighted a convoy of sea trucks. The submarine surfaced and commenced firing at the closest target, started a brisk fire, and shifted targets. Meanwhile, a shore battery opened up and was lobbing shells close by. When ammunition was expended, Lizardfish submerged, leaving behind three ships burning fiercely. She surfaced that night and headed for lifeguard station off Singapore in support of Army B-24 Liberator bomber strikes. The submarine arrived Subic Bay, Philippines, on 6 August and was there when Japan capitulated nine days later.

Lizardfish received one battle star for World War II service.

=== Postwar ===
Lizardfish cleared Subic Bay on 31 August and set course for the West Coast, touched Pearl Harbor, and arrived San Francisco on 22 September. At Eureka, CA, 24 October for Navy Day celebrations, Lizardfish five days later tied up at Tiburon, CA, remaining there until 2 January 1946, when she got underway to act as schoolship for the Sonar School at San Diego. She completed her training services on 5 March and reported for inactivation at San Francisco. After operations off the California coast, she was decommissioned, and entered the Pacific Reserve Fleet, Mare Island Navy Yard, on 24 June 1946.

== Evangelista Torricelli (S 512) ==
Lizardfish remained in reserve until 16 March 1959, when she departed for Pearl Harbor Naval Shipyard for Fleet Snorkel conversion and fitting out. She was transferred to the Government of Italy on 9 January 1960 and served the Italian Navy under the name Evangelista Torricelli (S 512). She was stripped of usable parts and the hull scrapped by the Italian Navy in 1976.
