= Japanese tanker Sakura Maru =

History

Empire of Japan
- Name: Sakura Maru (櫻丸)
- Namesake: Cherry blossom
- Owner: Petroleum Trading Co
- Builder: Mitsubishi Heavy Industries Shimonoseki
- Yard number: 301
- Laid down: 9 September 1943
- Launched: 30 December 1943
- Completed: 15 March 1944
- Identification: 51179
- Fate: Torpedoed and sunk by USS Hammerhead, 10 July 1945
- Notes: Call sign: JIOT

General characteristics
- Type: tanker
- Tonnage: 850 GRT
- Length: 58 m (190 ft 3 in)
- Beam: 10 m (32 ft 10 in)
- Draught: 4.9 m (16 ft 1 in)
- Propulsion: 750 hp (560 kW)
- Speed: 11–12 knots (20–22 km/h; 13–14 mph)

Sakura Maru (櫻丸) was a merchant oil tanker assigned to the Imperial Japanese Army during World War II. The ship was constructed in Japan in 1943 and completed in 1944. On 10 July 1945, the ship was sunk in a torpedo attack.

== History ==
It was laid down at yard number 301 on 9 September 1943 at the Shimonoseki shipyard of Mitsubishi Heavy Industries for the benefit of the Petroleum Trading Co., Ltd. (石油共販株式會社), and given identification number 51179. It was launched on 30 December 1943 and completed 15 March 1944. On 29 July 1944, it was chartered by the Imperial Japanese Army to serve as an oil tanker; it was never commissioned and remained in private ownership.

== Fate ==
On 10 July 1945, she was torpedoed and sunk by the USS Hammerhead in the Gulf of Thailand (at 09°38′N 101°31′E). Fellow tanker Nanmei Maru No. 5 was also sunk.
