= USS Menhaden (SS-377) =

Submarine of the United States

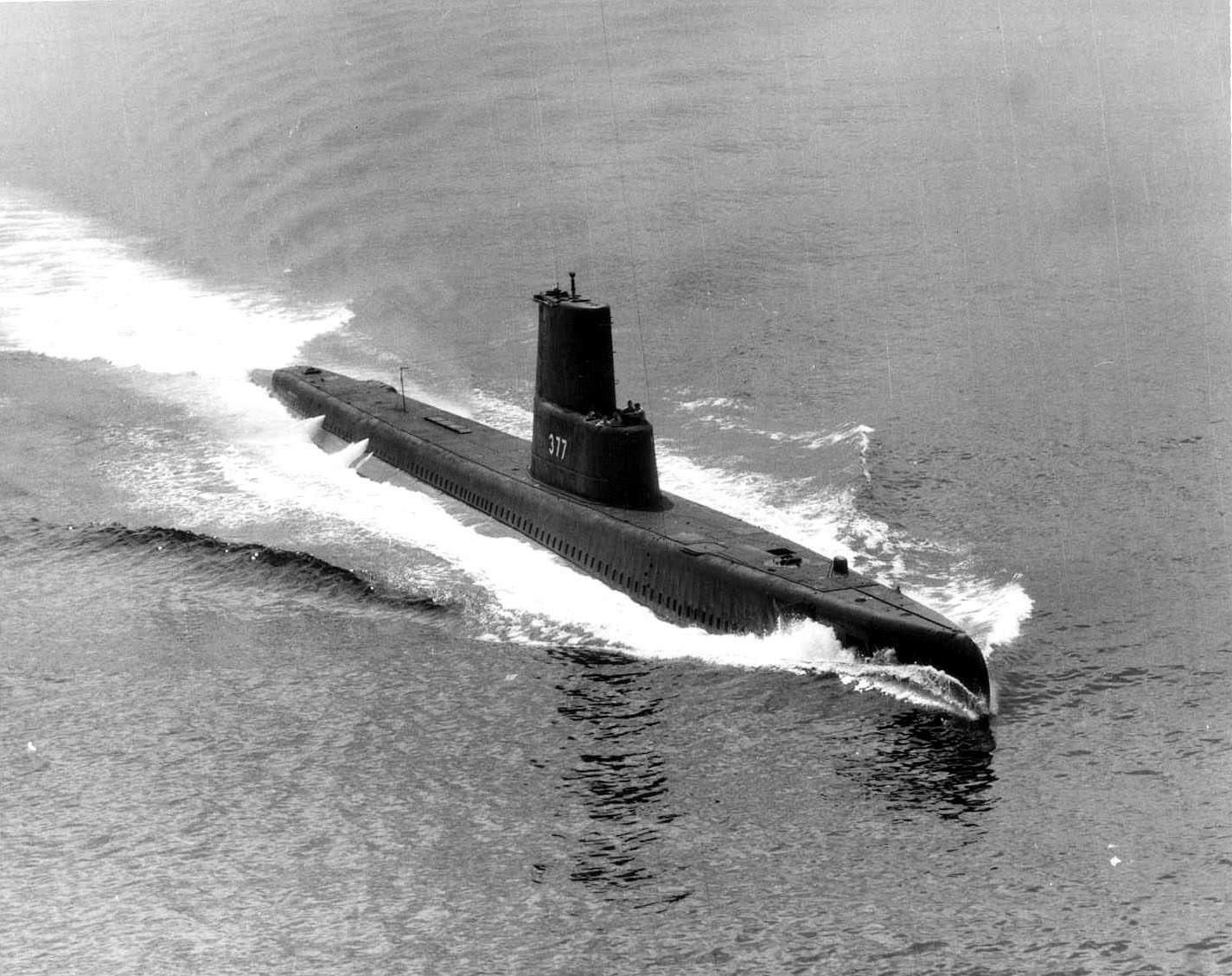
- Menhaden (SS-377) underway, c. 1961.

History

United States
- Name: USS Menhaden
- Namesake: Menhaden
- Builder: Manitowoc Shipbuilding Company, Manitowoc, Wisconsin
- Laid down: 21 June 1944
- Launched: 20 December 1944
- Commissioned: 22 June 1945
- Decommissioned: 31 May 1946
- Recommissioned: 7 August 1951
- Decommissioned: 13 August 1952
- Recommissioned: 6 March 1953
- Decommissioned: 13 August 1971
- Stricken: 15 August 1973
- Fate: Tethered underwater target in Keyport, Washington from 1976; sold for scrap, 1988

General characteristics
- Class & type: Balao-class diesel-electric submarine
- Displacement: 1,526 tons (1,550 t) surfaced; 2,424 tons (2,463 t) submerged
- Length: 311 ft 9 in (95.02 m)
- Beam: 27 ft 3 in (8.31 m)
- Draft: 16 ft 10 in (5.13 m) maximum
- Propulsion: 4 × General Motors Model 16-278A V16 diesel engines driving electrical generators; 2 × 126-cell Sargo batteries; 4 × high-speed General Electric electric motors with reduction gears; 2 × propellers; 5,400 shp (4.0 MW) surfaced; 2,740 shp (2.0 MW) submerged
- Speed: 20.25 knots (38 km/h) surfaced; 8.75 knots (16 km/h) submerged
- Range: 11,000 nautical miles (20,000 km) surfaced at 10 knots (19 km/h)
- Endurance: 48 hours at 2 knots (3.7 km/h) submerged; 75 days on patrol
- Test depth: 400 ft (120 m)
- Complement: 10 officers, 70–71 enlisted
- Armament: 10 × 21-inch (533 mm) torpedo tubes; 6 forward, 4 aft; 24 torpedoes; 1 × 5-inch (127 mm) / 25 caliber deck gun; Bofors 40 mm and Oerlikon 20 mm cannon

General characteristics (Guppy IIA)
- Class & type: none
- Displacement: 1,848 tons (1,878 t) surfaced; 2,440 tons (2,479 t) submerged
- Length: 307 ft (93.6 m)
- Beam: 27 ft 4 in (8.3 m)
- Draft: 17 ft (5.2 m)
- Propulsion: Snorkel added; One diesel engine and generator removed; Batteries upgraded to Sargo II
- Speed: Surfaced: 17.0 knots (19.6 mph; 31.5 km/h) maximum; 13.5 knots (15.5 mph; 25.0 km/h) cruising; Submerged: 14.1 knots (16.2 mph; 26.1 km/h) for ½ hour; 8.0 knots (9.2 mph; 14.8 km/h) snorkeling; 3.0 knots (3.5 mph; 5.6 km/h) cruising
- Armament: 10 × 21 inch (533 mm) torpedo tubes; (six forward, four aft); all guns removed

The second USS Menhaden (SS-377) was United States Navy Balao-class submarine. Launched in 1944, she operated out of Pearl Harbor until 1946, then continued in use out of various ports in the Pacific until the 1970s. She was then decommissioned and re-fitted as a remotely controlled, unmanned acoustic test vehicle known as the "Yellow Submarine", until she was scrapped in 1988.

== Name ==
Menhaden was the first submarine and second vessel of the United States Navy to be named for the menhaden, a marine fish of the herring family which is abundant off the Atlantic coast from New England southward.

== Launch and deployment ==
Menhaden was laid down by Manitowoc Shipbuilding Co., Manitowoc, Wisconsin, 21 June 1944; launched 20 December 1944; sponsored by Miss Mirium R. Johnson and commissioned at Manitowoc 22 June 1945.

Menhaden was skippered by Commander McClintock and manned by sailors from USS Darter which had been lost by grounding during the Battle of Leyte Gulf the previous October. Menhaden, the last of the Manitowoc-built boats to have commissioned service during World War II, trained in Lake Michigan until 15 July. Thence, she was floated down the Mississippi River to New Orleans where she departed for the Canal Zone 27 July. She conducted extensive training out of Balboa during the closing days of the war against Japan, and between 1 September and 16 September cruised to Pearl Harbor for duty with SubRon 19.

== Flagship for Admiral Nimitz ==
On 24 November 1945 Menhaden broke the flag of Fleet Adm. Chester W. Nimitz, CINCPAC and CINCPOA. Although untried in combat, she was one of the newest boats in the Submarine Service and was built with the lates submarine design and equipment for their time. Moreover her crew epitomized the "valor, skill, and dedicated service of submariners" during the long Pacific war. Thus, on her deck that morning Fleet Admiral Nimitz read his orders assigning him to duty as Chief of Naval Operations, and his relief, Adm. Raymond A. Spruance, read orders making him CINCPAC and CINPOA.

Menhaden operated out of Pearl Harbor until 2 January 1946 when she sailed for the west coast, arriving San Francisco 8 January. Following inactivation overhaul at Mare Island, she decommissioned 31 May 1946 and entered the Pacific Reserve Fleet. She recommissioned at Mare Island 7 August 1951, Lt. Comdr. Ralph G. Johns, Jr., in command. Assigned to SubRon 5, she operated along the west coast out of San Diego during the next year. She again decommissioned at Mare Island 13 August 1952 and began a GUPPY IIA overhaul and conversion to a snorkel submarine.

== Far East deployments ==
Menhaden recommissioned 6 March 1953, Lt. Comdr. William R. Werner in command. She joined SubRon 3 at San Diego 12 June, and on 21 September she sailed for the Far East. Operating out of Yokosuka, she ranged the East and South China Seas until 11 February 1954; thence, she returned to San Diego 23 March. For the next year and a half she operated in the eastern Pacific where she participated in fleet readiness exercises and type training assignments. On 18 August 1955 she began her second deployment to WesPac where she joined and supported the ever-vigilant Taiwan patrol force. She returned to the west coast 17 February 1956.

Menhaden completed six more deployments in the troubled waters of the Far East. As a unit of SubDiv 32, she cruised the western Pacific from Japan and Taiwan to the Philippines and Australia. She carried out surveillance and reconnaissance patrols off past and present areas of Cold War conflict from Korea to Vietnam.

When not deployed in the western Pacific, Menhaden maintained a schedule of intensive readiness and alert exercises. Home ported at San Diego, she participated in numerous fleet and intertype exercises. In addition, she supported sonar school operations and provided at-sea training for members of the Navy's Submarine Reserve Force.

== Vietnam service and fate ==
Early in 1968 Menhaden returned to the western Pacific. During a 6-month deployment she concentrated her operations in the waters off Vietnam. Later in the year she returned to the west coast where she continued to prepare for future "keeping-the-peace" missions.

Menhaden was decommissioned, 13 August 1971, and struck from the Naval Register, 15 August 1973.

In 1976, ex-Menhaden was towed from California to Washington to begin a new career as the "Yellow Submarine." The boat, stripped of her engines and painted yellow, was operated by the Naval Undersea Warfare Engineering Station in Keyport, Washington. Affectionately referred to as "The Hulk", she served as a remotely controlled, unmanned acoustic test vehicle capable of submerging to moderate depths in support of undersea weapons testing, and as a target ship to train Trident missile submarine crews off the coast of Washington.

In 1988 she sank, due to a leaking main-ballast-tank vent-valve when she was being cut up for scrap. As the tide came in, she was not able to float fast enough to avoid being flooded through all of the holes cut through her pressure hull. The city of Everett eventually finished scrapping the abandoned hulk.

== Awards ==
- Asiatic-Pacific Campaign Medal for World War II service
- World War II Victory Medal
- China Service Medal
- National Defense Service Medal with one star
- Armed Forces Expeditionary Medal
- Vietnam Service Medal with two campaign stars
