= USS Hammerhead (SS-364) =

Submarine of the United States

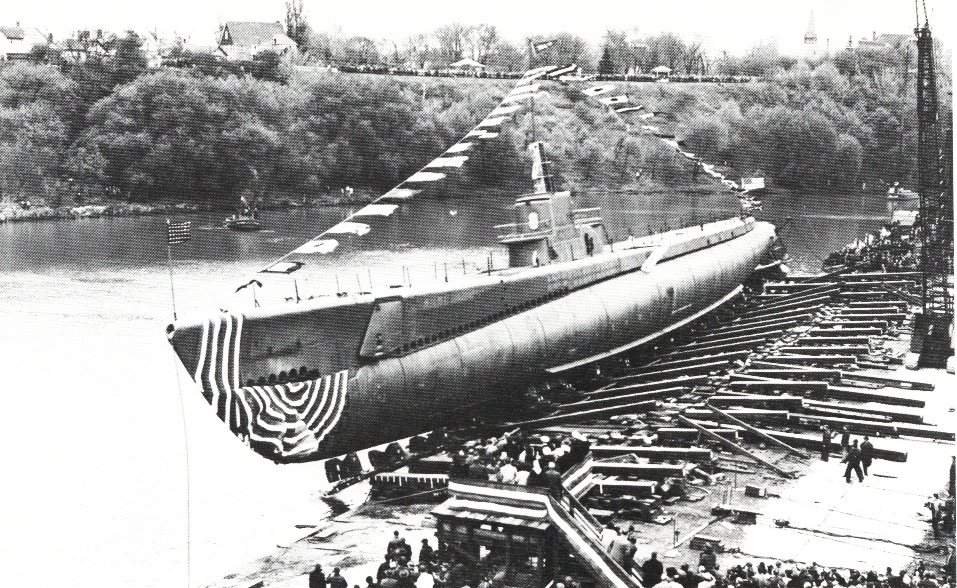
- Hammerhead (SS-364) slides into the Manitowoc River.

History

United States
- Name: Hammerhead
- Namesake: Hammerhead shark
- Builder: Manitowoc Shipbuilding Co., Manitowoc, Wisconsin
- Laid down: 5 May 1943
- Launched: 24 October 1943
- Commissioned: 1 March 1944
- Decommissioned: 9 February 1946
- Recommissioned: 6 February 1952
- Decommissioned: 21 August 1953
- Recommissioned: 16 July 1954
- Decommissioned: 23 October 1954
- Fate: Transferred to Turkey 23 October 1954; Sold to Turkey 1 January 1972
- Stricken: 1 January 1972

Turkey
- Name: TCG Cerbe (S 341)
- Namesake: Battle of Djerba
- Acquired: 23 October 1954
- Commissioned: 23 October 1954
- Decommissioned: 4 May 1972
- Fate: Scrapped

General characteristics
- Class & type: Gato-class diesel-electric submarine
- Displacement: 1,525 tons (1,549 t) surfaced; 2,424 tons (2,460 t) submerged
- Length: 311 ft 9 in (95.02 m)
- Beam: 27 ft 3 in (8.31 m)
- Draft: 17 ft 0 in (5.18 m) maximum
- Propulsion: 4 × General Motors Model 16-278A V16 diesel engines driving electrical generators; 2 × 126-cell Sargo batteries; 4 × high-speed General Electric electric motors with reduction gears; 2 × propellers; 5,400 shp (4.0 MW) surfaced; 2,740 shp (2.0 MW) submerged
- Speed: 21 knots (39 km/h) surfaced; 9 knots (17 km/h) submerged
- Range: 11,000 nmi (20,000 km) surfaced at 10 knots (19 km/h)
- Endurance: 48 hours at 2 knots (4 km/h) submerged; 75 days on patrol
- Test depth: 300 ft (90 m)
- Complement: 6 officers, 54 enlisted (peace); 80-85 (war)
- Armament: 10 × 21 inch (533 mm) torpedo tubes (six forward, four aft; 24 torpedoes); one 3 in (76 mm)/50 caliber deck gun; two .30 cal (7.62 mm) machineguns

USS Hammerhead (hull number SS-364), a Gato-class submarine, was the first ship of the United States Navy to be named for the hammerhead shark, a shark found in warm seas with a flattened anterior forward of the gill slits, presenting a hammer-like silhouette when viewed from above.

== Construction and commissioning ==
Hammerhead initially was ordered as a unit of the Balao class, but her builder, the Manitowoc Shipbuilding Company, did not receive the drawings for the Balao class from the Electric Boat Company in time to build Hammerhead or the submarines USS Golet (SS-361), USS Guavina (SS-362), and USS Guitarro (SS-363) to the new design, so they were built as Gato-class submarines. Thus, in some references, these four submarines are listed as units of the Balao-class.

Hammerhead was launched on 24 October 1943 by the Manitowoc Shipbuilding Company at Manitowoc, Wisconsin, sponsored by Mrs. R. W Berry, and commissioned on 1 March 1944.

== Operational history ==
After a month's training in Lake Michigan, Hammerhead was placed in a floating drydock and towed down the Mississippi River to New Orleans, Louisiana, where she arrived on 8 April 1944. She subsequently proceeded to Balboa, Panama Canal Zone, for further training, and thence to Pearl Harbor, Hawaii.

=== First patrol, June – August 1944 ===
The submarine departed Pearl Harbor on her first war patrol 6 June 1944 in company with Steelhead (SS-280) and Parche (SS-384). Cruising the seas south of Formosa, her first engagement came 9 June when she sank a sampan with gunfire. She then encountered a coastal oiler 29 June and closed for the attack, but the torpedoes failed to strike home and a surprise aerial attack forced the sub down. At the Next day, Hammerhead damaged several ships of a convoy. She made port at Fremantle, Australia 17 August 1944.

=== Second patrol, September – November 1944 ===
Hammerhead's second war patrol was conducted in the Java and South China Seas. She departed Fremantle 9 September and made her first attack the night of 1 October, when a convoy consisting of four cargo ships, one oiler, and three escorts was detected off Borneo. Hammerhead fired 10 torpedoes, scored a total of 6 hits, and sent 3 of the cargo ships to the bottom (Hiyori Maru, Higane Maru, Kokusei Maru).

The morning of 20 October the submarine found still another six ship convoy, and after evading one of the escorts delivered a six-torpedo attack. Two more cargo ships fell victim to Hammerhead's marksmanship. The submarine returned from this highly successful patrol 2 November 1944, and was later awarded the Navy Unit Commendation for her outstanding performance.

=== Third and fourth patrols, November 1944 – March 1945 ===
The submarine commenced her third war patrol 25 November, returning to the South China Sea. On this cruise she operated with Lapon (SS-260) and Paddle (SS-263), and although several attacks were made, no sinkings resulted. She returned to Fremantle 17 January 1945.

Hammerhead departed on her fourth war patrol 19 February, in company with Baya (SS-318). Patrolling off Cape Varella, she detected a convoy and two escorts 23 February and while closing the cargo ships obtained a perfect shot on an escort. A spread of four torpedoes sank Japanese frigate Yaku. Due to the illness of her commanding officer, the submarine was forced to end her patrol, and moored at Subic Bay 3 March 1945.

=== Fifth and sixth patrols, March – May 1945 ===
Beginning her fifth war patrol 10 March 1945, Hammerhead proceeded to the coast of Indochina, where on 29 March she detected a large escorted convoy. Working her way inside the screen, the submarine was able to get a clear shot at an escort vessel, and a single hit broke her in two. After sinking the escort, Hammerhead damaged other members of the group before retiring. She returned from this war patrol 6 April 1945, mooring at Subic Bay, Philippines.

For her sixth war patrol Hammerhead operated in the Gulf of Siam. She arrived 6 May and that night encountered a small tanker and two escorts. After missing with two torpedoes at extreme range the submarine found the mark in a second attack, sinking the tanker Kinrei Maru. Hammerhead attacked other ships of the convoy without success and after a depth charge attack decided to break off. Sighting a cargo carrier 14 May with only an aircraft escort, Hammerhead made a perfect approach and sank the ship with two torpedoes. She returned from this patrol 25 May.

=== Seventh patrol, June – August 1945 ===
Hammerhead departed Fremantle 21 June on her seventh and last war patrol, also carried out in the Gulf of Siam, in company with three other submarines. Her major attack of this patrol occurred 10 July, when she sank cargo ships Sakura Maru and Nanmei Maru No. 5. The patrol was brought to a close 21 August 1945 at Pearl Harbor.

=== Decommissioning, 1945 ===
Hammerhead arrived Mare Island, Calif., for decommissioning 20 August 1945 and decommissioned 9 February 1946. She was then placed in the Reserve Fleet at Mare Island.

=== 1952–1953 ===
Hammerhead was brought out of reserve during the Korean War, recommissioned 6 February 1952, and engaged in training duty on the United States West Coast between San Diego and San Francisco, California, until 21 August 1953, when she decommissioned for return to the Reserve Fleet.

=== July–October 1954 ===
Earmarked for loan under the Military Assistance Program, Hammerhead was converted to a GUPPY submarine at Mare Island Naval Shipyard and recommissioned once more 16 July 1954 to prepare for transfer. She was decommissioned on 23 October 1954 and loaned to Turkey the same day.

=== TCG Cerbe (S 341) ===
The submarine was commissioned by the Turkish Navy on 23 October 1954 as TCG Cerbe (S 03), the Turkish name of the island of Djerba. She was the first submarine of that name, a reference to the 1560 Battle of Djerba. She later was redesignated S 341. The United States formally sold Cerbe to Turkey on 1 January 1972. She was decommissioned on 4 May 1972 and subsequently scrapped.

== Awards ==
- Navy Unit Commendation
- Asiatic–Pacific Campaign Medal with seven battle stars for World War II service
- World War II Victory Medal
- National Defense Service Medal
