= USS Loggerhead =

Submarine of the United States

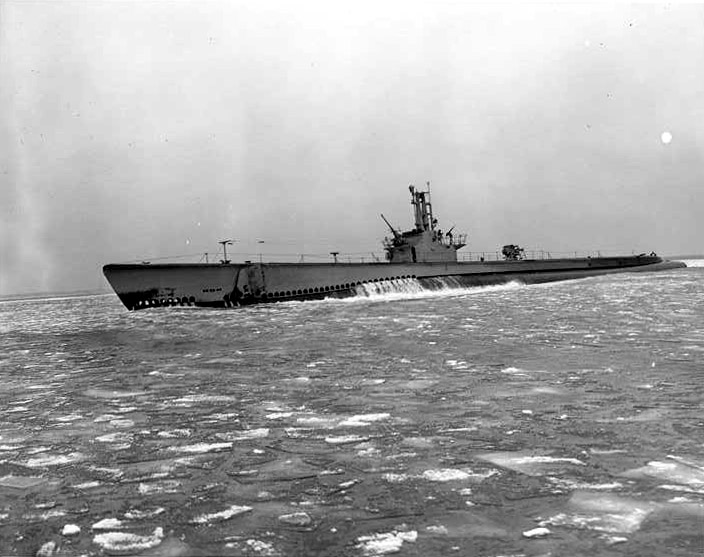
- Loggerhead (SS-374), during sea trials on Lake Michigan, winter 1944.

History

United States
- Builder: Manitowoc Shipbuilding Company, Manitowoc, Wisconsin
- Laid down: 1 April 1944
- Launched: 13 August 1944
- Commissioned: 9 February 1945
- Decommissioned: 16 June 1946
- Stricken: 30 June 1967
- Fate: Sold for scrap, 29 August 1969

General characteristics
- Class & type: Balao class diesel-electric submarine
- Displacement: 1,526 tons (1,550 t) surfaced; 2,424 tons (2,463 t) submerged
- Length: 311 ft 9 in (95.02 m)
- Beam: 27 ft 3 in (8.31 m)
- Draft: 16 ft 10 in (5.13 m) maximum
- Propulsion: 4 × General Motors Model 16-278A V16 diesel engines driving electrical generators; 2 × 126-cell Sargo batteries; 4 × high-speed General Electric electric motors with reduction gears; 2 × propellers; 5,400 shp (4.0 MW) surfaced; 2,740 shp (2.0 MW) submerged
- Speed: 20.25 knots (38 km/h) surfaced; 8.75 knots (16 km/h) submerged
- Range: 11,000 nautical miles (20,000 km) surfaced at 10 knots (19 km/h)
- Endurance: 48 hours at 2 knots (3.7 km/h) submerged; 75 days on patrol
- Test depth: 400 ft (120 m)
- Complement: 10 officers, 70–71 enlisted
- Armament: 10 × 21-inch (533 mm) torpedo tubes; 6 forward, 4 aft; 24 torpedoes; 1 × 5-inch (127 mm) / 25 caliber deck gun; Bofors 40 mm and Oerlikon 20 mm cannon

USS Loggerhead (SS-374/AGSS-374), a Balao-class submarine, was a ship of the United States Navy named for the loggerhead, Caretta caretta, a very large, carnivorous sea turtle common in the warmer parts of the Atlantic, Pacific, and Indian Oceans.

Loggerhead (SS-374) was laid down on 1 April 1944 by Manitowoc Shipbuilding Co., Manitowoc, Wisc.; launched 13 August 1944; sponsored by Mrs. Barbara Fox; and commissioned on 9 February 1945.

Loggerhead emerged from the Manitowoc River into Lake Michigan on 1 March 1945 and headed via Chicago to Lockport, Ill., where she entered a floating drydock and was towed down the Mississippi River. She arrived at New Orleans 7 March and departed 5 days later transiting the Panama Canal and arriving at Pearl Harbor on 8 April.

Loggerhead's first war patrol started 15 May when she departed Hawaii and headed via Saipan for the Luzon Straits and the South China Sea. Patrolling along the east coast of Hainan Island, she sighted an enemy hospital ship 11 June and allowed it to pass unharmed. Three days later, Loggerhead bombarded a suspected radar installation at Gap Rock south of Hong Kong, causing severe damage to the tower.

Much time was devoted to lifeguard duty during this patrol. Changing patrol areas and briefly stopping at Subic Bay 1 July for fuel, the submarine headed for an assigned lifeguard station south of Hong Kong. She stopped numerous native boats, questioned their crews, and learned that the Japanese were commandeering all native boats in the ports which they controlled.

On 13 July the submarine fired five torpedoes at enemy ships in Semarang Roadstead. The next day, the submarine headed for Australia, transiting Lombok Straits between Bali and Lombok Island during daylight on 14 July. While Loggerhead passed between these islands, the enemy shore batteries surprised her with hot fire. Evading the bursts of the Japanese shells through skillful maneuvers, Loggerhead escaped undamaged. She arrived at Fremantle on 19 July.

The end of hostilities on 15 August found Loggerhead two days out of Fremantle heading for the Gulf of Siam on her second war patrol. She put in Subic Bay on 22 August, departed for the United States 31 August via Pearl Harbor, and arrived at San Francisco 22 September 1945. Loggerhead was decommissioned at Mare Island Navy Yard 16 June 1946 and was placed in the Pacific Reserve Fleet.

In 1960 she was assigned as a US Naval Reserve Training Ship and towed to Portland, Oregon. In December 1962 she was reclassified an auxiliary submarine, AGSS-374, and she continued to serve as a reserve training submarine in Portland until 30 June 1967 when she was relieved by auxiliary submarine Rasher (SS-269). Struck from the Naval Vessel Register on the same date, Loggerhead was sold for scrap in early 1969.
