= SD radar =

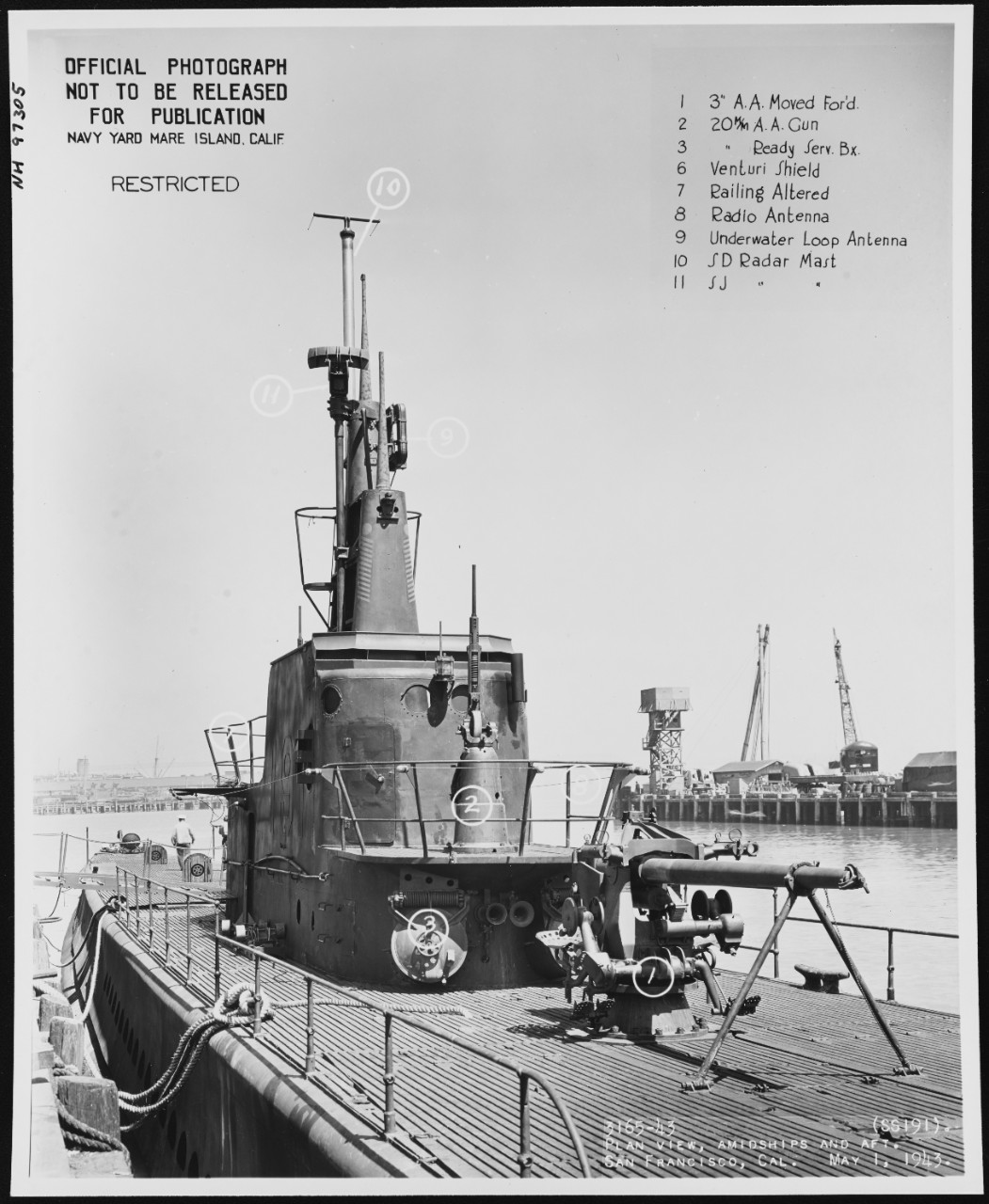
- Various masts and equipment of the USS Sculpin in 1943. The SD radar mast in designated as item 10.
- Country of origin: United States
- Manufacturer: RCA Victor Division of RCA
- Designer: US Naval Research Laboratory
- Introduced: 1941
- No. built: 400+
- Frequency: 114 MHz
- PRF: 60 Hz
- Beamwidth: 40° (horizontal)
- Pulsewidth: 8.5 µs
- RPM: 4
- Range: 20 mi (32 km)
- Altitude: 1,000 ft (300 m)
- Azimuth: 360º
- Precision: 450 m (1,480 ft)
- Power: 100 kw (SD-5 130 kw)

The SD radar was an early form of radar developed by the United States Naval Research Laboratory between 1940 and 1941. It was installed on submarines to provide warning of enemy aircraft. Its omnidirectional antenna, however, prevented it from being able to provide bearing information, and it was used as a proximity radar. Its range was directly affected by the aircraft's size and altitude. Large aircraft with an altitude above 1000 feet AGL could be detected between twelve and twenty miles, and small aircraft at the same altitude between eight and fifteen miles, while aircraft flying lower could avoid detection altogether. Another disadvantage was the enemy's ability to use the SD radar signal to locate and target submarines, leading submarine commanders to only use the SD radar intermittently so as not to disclose their location.

== See also ==
- SJ radar
