= USS Raton =

Submarine of the United States

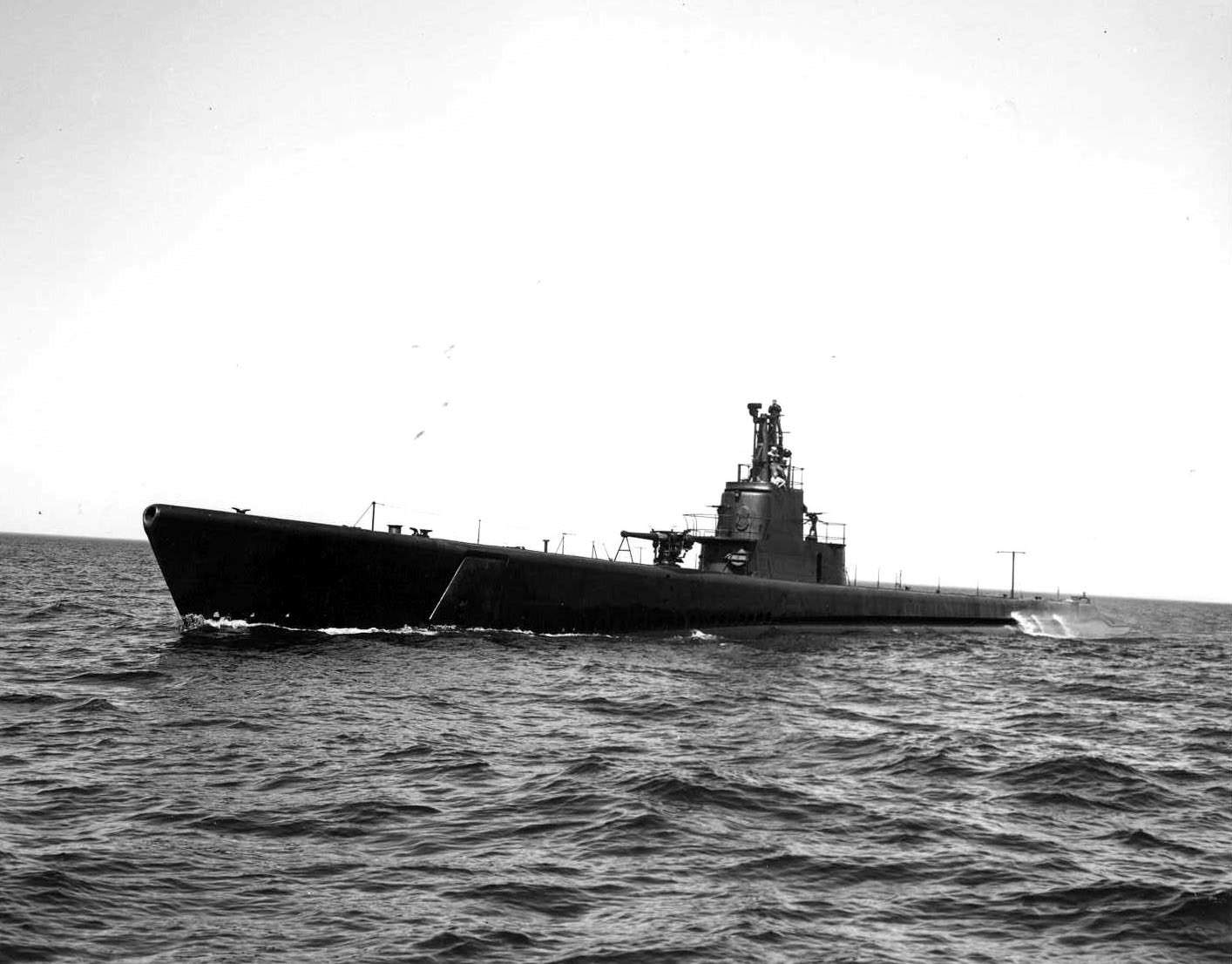
- USS Raton (SS-270) during trials on Lake Michigan on 1 July 1943.

History

United States
- Builder: Manitowoc Shipbuilding Company, Manitowoc, Wisconsin
- Laid down: 29 May 1942
- Launched: 24 January 1943
- Sponsored by: Mrs. C. C. West
- Commissioned: 13 July 1943
- Decommissioned: 11 March 1949
- Recommissioned: 21 September 1953
- Decommissioned: 28 June 1969
- Stricken: 28 June 1969
- Fate: Sold for scrap 12 October 1973

General characteristics
- Class & type: Gato-class diesel-electric submarine
- Displacement: 1,525 tons (1,549 t) surfaced; 2,424 tons (2,460 t) submerged
- Length: 311 ft 9 in (95.02 m)
- Beam: 27 ft 3 in (8.31 m)
- Draft: 17 ft 0 in (5.18 m) maximum
- Propulsion: 4 × Fairbanks-Morse Model 38D8-⅛ 9-cylinder opposed piston diesel engines driving electrical generators; 2 × 126-cell Sargo batteries; 4 × high-speed General Electric electric motors with reduction gears; two propellers; 5,400 shp (4.0 MW) surfaced; 2,740 shp (2.0 MW) submerged
- Speed: 21 knots (39 km/h) surfaced; 9 knots (17 km/h) submerged
- Range: 11,000 NM (20,000 km) surfaced at 10 knots (19 km/h)
- Endurance: 48 hours at 2 knots (4 km/h) submerged; 75 days on patrol
- Test depth: 300 ft (90 m)
- Complement: 6 officers, 54 enlisted
- Armament: 10 × 21-inch (533 mm) torpedo tubes; 6 forward, 4 aft; 24 torpedoes; 1 × 3-inch (76 mm) / 50 caliber deck gun; Bofors 40 mm and Oerlikon 20 mm cannon

USS Raton (SS/SSR/AGSS-270), a Gato-class submarine, was a ship of the United States Navy named for the raton, a polynemoid fish inhabiting semitropical waters off the Pacific coast of the Americas.

== Construction and commissioning ==
A fleet submarine, Raton was laid down on 29 May 1942 by the Manitowoc Shipbuilding Company at Manitowoc, Wisconsin. She was launched on 24 January 1943, sponsored by Mrs. C. C. West, and commissioned on 13 July 1943.

== Service history ==
=== World War II ===
==== July–October 1943 ====
Following training in Lake Michigan, Raton moved to Coco Solo in the Panama Canal Zone for additional training. She was off Coco Solo on 11 August 1943 when the merchant ship SS Hiram Maxim′s United States Navy Armed Guard mistakenly opened fire on her, firing one 5-inch (127 mm) and two 3-inch (76.2 mm) rounds. Raton immediately crash-dived and sustained no damage.

Raton departed Panama for the South West Pacific Area on 19 September 1943, and upon arriving at Brisbane, Australia, on 16 October 1943, joined Submarine Force, United States Seventh Fleet.

==== First war patrol, November – December 1943 ====
From Brisbane, Raton headed for Tulagi in the Solomon Islands for her first war patrol which she conducted from 20 November to 6 December 1943 — in the Bismarck Archipelago–Solomons–New Guinea area. On 24 November 1943, while patrolling west of Massau, Raton sighted a Japanese convoy of two cargo ships escorted by two destroyers and a Nakajima A6M2-N (Allied reporting name "Rufe") floatplane. She trailed the convoy and that night made a torpedo attack, sinking the cargo ship Onoe Maru. Displaying excellent antisubmarine warfare proficiency, the two destroyers thwarted four attempts Raton made to sink the remaining cargo ship.

On 28 November 1943, Raton sighted a Rabaul-bound Japanese convoy of five cargo ships accompanied by two escorts. In a submerged attack, Raton sank two of the cargo ships, Hokko Maru and Yuri Maru. After a severe pounding by the escorts, Raton escaped, but she remained in the area to renew her attack on the convoy. In a night attack, she heavily damaged a third cargo ship, then called for assistance, as her torpedoes were nearly expended. The submarine USS Gato (SS-212) arrived and joined the attack, only to be attacked by the two Japanese destroyers. Raton surfaced and raced at flank speed to draw the escorts away from Gato and succeeded, allowing Gato to sink the cargo ship Columbia Maru. Raton concluded her patrol with her return to Milne Bay, New Guinea, for rest and refit there alongside the submarine tender USS Fulton (AS-11).

==== Second and third war patrols, December 1943–April 1944 ====
Raton departed Milne Bay on her second war patrol— conducted from 11 December 1943 to 25 January 1944 — bound for the Mindanao–Celebes–Halmahera area. On 24 December 1943, she attacked a Japanese convoy of four merchant ships and two destroyers in Morotai Strait, sinking the merchant ship Heiwa Maru and damaging an auxiliary aircraft carrier.

On 2 January 1944, Raton encountered two Japanese tankers escorted by a Fubuki-class destroyer northwest of Faland Island on the Palau shipping lane. She scored hits on one tanker, but then the Japanese escorts interrupted her attack. Raton departed the patrol area on 19 January 1944 and reached Fremantle, Australia, on 25 January 1944 for refit by the submarine tender USS Pelias (AS-14).

Raton conducted her third war patrol from 18 February to 14 April in the Java Sea, the Karimata Strait, and the South China Sea. The submarine Rasher sank the only two ships Raton contacted during the patrol.

==== Fourth war patrol, May–June 1944 ====
Raton′s fourth patrol began on 19 May when she got underway for a patrol area in the South China Sea and Java Sea, which provided good hunting. On 23 May 1944, she intercepted two small intercoastal cargo ships north of the Tambelan Islands and sank both with her deck gun. That same evening, she contacted the Japanese fast convoy Hi-63, which consisted of three transports and four destroyers. She sank the destroyer Iki, and damaged a transport.

On 27 May 1944, Raton′s logbook reported:

"0615 (H) Ship shaken up considerably by either two underwater explosions or by striking submerged object. People in forward torpedo room thought we had struck something or had been struck by something."

This turned out to be two torpedoes fired by the submarine USS Lapon (SS-260). Lapon was looking for a Japanese submarine passing through the area and mistook Raton for that submarine. Lapon′s commanding officer checked fire on the second set of torpedoes realizing he was not shooting at an enemy submarine. Later dry-dock inspection of Raton showed dents where the torpedoes hit. This is the only known friendly fire incident in World War II between two U.S. submarines.

On 28 May 1944, Raton sighted and tracked a Japanese Type L submarine, but was unable to attack due to an unfavorable firing angle.

On 6 June 1944, a bright moonlit night allowed Raton to sight a large Japanese convoy of 11 ships with four destroyer-type escorts. Three hits from a spread of torpedoes Raton fired blew apart one frigate, but Raton received a severe pounding from a prolonged depth charge attack before making her escape.

A boarding party from Raton captured a small sailing vessel on 13 June 1944, taking 11 prisoners-of-war and scuttling the craft. On 17 June 1944, Raton sighted a small cargo ship, sinking it with one torpedo and rescuing nine survivors. Raton returned to Fremantle on 23 June 1944 for upkeep alongside the submarine tender Orion.

==== Fifth and sixth war patrols, July–December 1944 ====
Raton′s fifth war patrol, conducted from 18 July to 10 September 1944 with a patrol area in the South China Sea off Luzon, gave her only one victory, a Japanese tanker left beached off Dasol Bay, in the Philippines on 4 August 1944.

Raton had better luck on her sixth war patrol, which she began on 6 October 1944, again with a patrol area in the South China Sea. On the night of 18 October 1944, Raton slipped into the center of a nine-ship Japanese convoy for a surface attack. She fired both sets of torpedo tubes, her bow tubes at six overlapping targets and her stern tubes at a large cargo ship. Two merchant ships — Shiranesan Maru and Taikai Maru — sank, and another vessel was damaged. A final attack resulted in damage to another cargo ship. With her torpedo supply running low and a typhoon approaching, Raton pulled into Mios Woendi in the Schouten Islands for more fuel and torpedoes with which to finish the patrol.

Leaving Mios Woendi 27 October 1944, Raton encountered a Japanese task group of two heavy cruisers and five escort vessels on 6 November 1944. In a submerged attack, she scored three hits on the Mogami-class heavy cruiser Kumano, but did not put Kumano out of action.

On 11 November 1944, Raton and the submarine USS Ray (SS-271) attacked a four-ship Japanese convoy guarded by three escorts. In a surface action, Raton sank Unkai Maru and Kurasaki with four torpedoes. Then, both submarines fired torpedoes at the remaining auxiliary ships with unconfirmed results. With only four torpedoes remaining, Raton headed for the United States, arriving at San Francisco, California, on 1 December 1944.

==== Seventh and eighth war patrols, April–July 1945 ====
On 13 March 1945, after an overhaul at Mare Island Navy Yard in Vallejo, California, Raton headed west for Pearl Harbor, HAwaii, for refresher training. She departed for the Yellow Sea on 20 April 1945 to begin her seventh war patrol. On 2 May 1945, she blew up a loaded Japanese tanker, Toryu Maru, in a night torpedo attack off China′ Shantung Peninsula despite gunfire from two Japanese escorts. That same day, Raton sank a medium-sized Japanese cargo ship, Rezikan Maru, in a submerged torpedo approach. On 16 May 1945, she made a submerged attack on two Japanese transports, sinking the larger one, Eiju Maru. Raton concluded the patrol with her arrival at Guam on 25 May 1945 for upkeep alongside the submarine tender USS Proteus (AS-19).

Raton departed Guam on 22 June 1945 for her final patrol of World War II, tasked with lifeguard duty off Hong Kong. No Allied planes went down in the area, and she made no contact with Japanese forces. Arriving at Subic Bay in the Philippines on 23 July 1945 for upkeep, Raton was preparing for her next patrol when the war ended on 15 August 1945.

=== Post-World War II service, 1946–1948 ===
==== 1945–1949 ====
On 31 August 1945. Raton departed the Philippines for the United States, arriving at San Francisco in mid-September 1945. Following overhaul at Mare Island Navy Yard, Raton transited the Panama Canal, and arrived Naval Submarine Base New London in New London, Connecticut, on 12 March 1946, where she was assigned to the United States Second Fleet. As the Cold War began, she spent the next 2½ years in training exercises in the North Atlantic Ocean and the Caribbean Sea. After being placed in reserve in the fall of 1948, Raton was decommissioned at Atlantic Reserve Fleet, New London on 11 March 1949.

==== Radar picket submarine (SSR-270), 1953–1959 ====
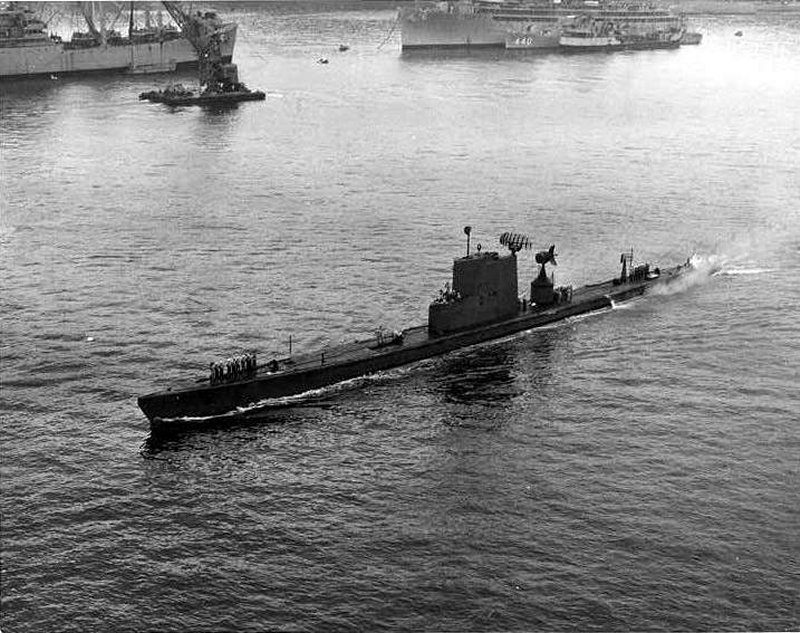
Raton (SSR-270) as a radar picket submarine, c. 1953–60.

Raton remained in the Atlantic Reserve Fleet at New London until July 1952, when she was towed to the Philadelphia Naval Shipyard in Philadelphia, Pennsylvania, for conversion to a radar picket submarine. Accordingly redesignated SSR-270 on 18 July 1952, she was recommissioned on 21 September 1953, Commander J. K. Wills in command. Departing Philadelphia on 8 December 1953, Raton underwent training for several months in the Norfolk, Virginia, area, operating from Naval Station Norfolk. Ordered to the Pacific, she arrived at San Diego, California, on 7 March 1954 via the Panama Canal.

Raton spent the next year in local operations before departing San Diego on 11 May 1955 for a six-month deployment to the western Pacific as a unit of the United States Seventh Fleet, her first post-World War II deployment to the Western Pacific. She returned to San Diego on 6 November 1955, and subsequently trained off the United States West Coast. She deployed to the western Pacific for her second post-World War II Seventh Fleet deployment on 13 May 1957. She returned to San Diego on 8 November 1957 and resumed training activities.

After overhaul at Hunter's Point Naval Shipyard in San Francisco from 7 July to 24 November 1958 and subsequent underway training, Raton made a third post-World War II deployment in the Seventh Fleet in the western Pacific from early March to mid-November 1959, participating in operations with forces of the Southeast Asia Treaty Organization (SEATO) and the Japan Maritime Self-Defense Force. In early 1960, Raton was engaged in local operations in the San Diego area, including evaluation of new sonar concepts and the training of Underwater Demolition Team personnel in covert reconnaissance.

==== Auxiliary research submarine (AGSS-270), 1960–1968 ====
On 1 July 1960, Raton was reclassified as an auxiliary submarine and redesignated AGSS-270. After a major overhaul at Mare Island Naval Shipyard from January to April 1961, she headed west for her fourth post-World War II western Pacific deployment with the Seventh Fleet on 3 July 1961, returning to San Diego on 19 December 1961. She spent 1962 in fleet training operations off the U.S. West Coast, providing services for air, surface, and submarine forces. On 9 April 1962, it was reported that a kite had snagged on Raton, and this incident was referenced in the Peanuts comic strip of 19 May 1962, wherein it is implied that the kite had belonged to the long-suffering Charlie Brown, whose problems with flying kites was a standard running gag of the strip.

Raton′s fifth post-World War II western Pacific deployment, from January to June 1963, included participation in two major anti-submarine warfare exercises with U.S. and SEATO forces. Following an overhaul period from November 1963 to early March 1964, Raton deployed again to the western Pacific from 6 July to 23 December 1964, where she operated with naval forces of Thailand, the Philippines, and the Republic of China, under the Military Assistance Program.

Raton engaged in local fleet and type operations in the San Diego area during 1965 and early 1966. In mid-April 1966, she got underway for another tour of duty with the Seventh Fleet. While deployed, she exercised with SEATO naval units in Exercise Sea Imp. On 17 October 1966, she returned to San Diego.

Raton spent 1967 in the San Diego area in local operations, conducting United States Naval Reserve training and undergoing a semiannual overhaul. On 20 and 21 May 1968, she served as a test ship to determine whether a small fleet tug could rescue men from a sunken submarine resting on the ocean floor. Raton commenced her final western Pacific deployment 15 July 1968, arriving at Yokohama, Japan, on 7 August 1968. During her deployment, she provided training services to Seventh Fleet and SEATO units. She returned to San Diego on 20 December 1968.

== Decommissioning and disposal ==
Raton was decommissioned at Mare Island Naval Shipyard and stricken from the Navy List on 28 June 1969. Her stripped hull was designated as a target ship for United States Pacific Fleet gunnery exercise. She was sold for scrapping on 10 December 1973.

== Honors and awards ==
- Asiatic-Pacific Campaign Medal with six battle stars for World War II service

Medal]]

- Vietnam Service Medal with two battle stars for Vietnam War service
