= SJ radar =

WW2 American radar set for submarines

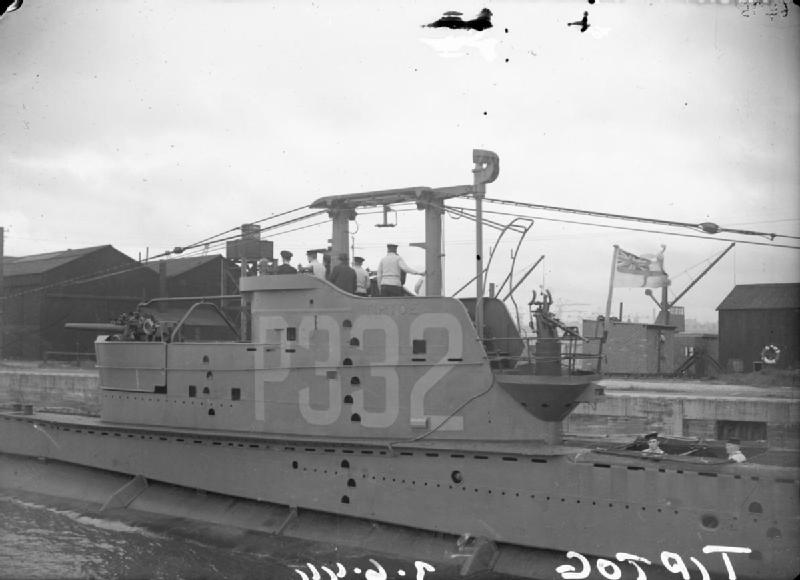
- SJ radar on British submarine HMS Tiptoe
- Country of origin: USA
- Introduced: June 1942
- Type: Surface Search, limited air search capabilities.
- Frequency: S-band (10cm wavelength)
- PRF: 1350-1650
- Beamwidth: 7.5° × 13°
- Pulsewidth: 1 μs

SJ radar was a type of S band (10-cm) radar set used on American submarines during the Second World War. The widespread use of the SJ radar, combined with the very low use of radar in the Imperial Japanese Navy, gave great operational flexibility to the United States Navy's submarine campaign in the Pacific Ocean.

The first prototype SJ was deployed in December 1941, but it was mid-1942 before they became common equipment. SJ radar was on all submarines by early 1943. The SJ was the second type of radar deployed on submarines during the war, representing a substantial improvement over the previous SD radar. The SJ was a variant of the SG surface search radar used on surface warships, contained in sets capable of fitting through submarine hatches for installation and designed to lie close to the curved hulls.

The SJ provided directional and distance information about surface contacts as well as low-flying aircraft.

The SJ radar was even used as a communications device. When used with a telegraph key, the SJ radar could send signals on a point-to-point basis between two submarines operating in a wolf pack. The directionality of the antenna and the short range provided relatively high security for this transmission.

The museum submarines USS Cobia (SS-245) and USS Cod (SS-224) have an operating example of the radar.

== Variants ==
- SJ: First version.
- SJa: Field modification, additional power (50kW) compared to initial version.
- SJ-1: 300 built. New, perforated parabolic antenna design. Surface search range increased to over thirty miles.
