= USS Ray (SS-271) =

Submarine of the United States

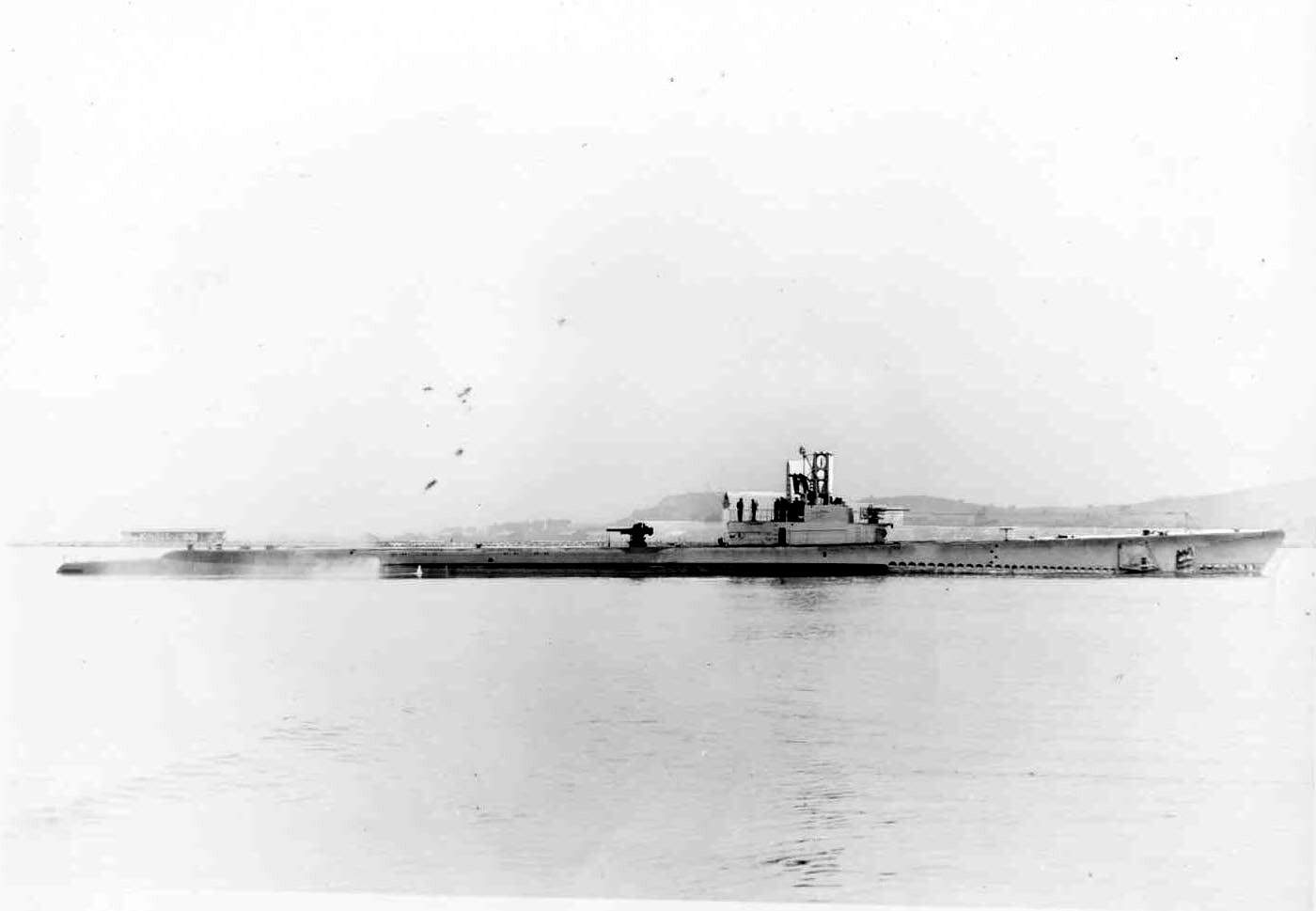
- Ray (SS-271) c. 1945.

History

United States
- Builder: Manitowoc Shipbuilding Company, Manitowoc, Wisconsin
- Laid down: 20 July 1942
- Launched: 28 February 1943
- Sponsored by: Mrs. S. C. Loomis
- Commissioned: 27 July 1943
- Decommissioned: 12 February 1947
- Recommissioned: 13 August 1952
- Decommissioned: 30 September 1958
- Stricken: 1 April 1960
- Fate: Sold for scrap, 18 December 1960

General characteristics
- Class & type: Gato-class diesel-electric submarine
- Displacement: 1,525 long tons (1,549 t) surfaced; 2,424 long tons (2,463 t) submerged
- Length: 311 ft 9 in (95.02 m)
- Beam: 27 ft 3 in (8.31 m)
- Draft: 17 ft 0 in (5.18 m) maximum
- Propulsion: 4 × Fairbanks-Morse Model 38D8-⅛ 9-cylinder opposed piston diesel engines driving electrical generators; 2 × 126-cell Sargo batteries; 4 × high-speed General Electric electric motors with reduction gears; two propellers; 5,400 shp (4.0 MW) surfaced; 2,740 shp (2.0 MW) submerged
- Speed: 21 knots (39 km/h) surfaced; 9 knots (17 km/h) submerged
- Range: 11,000 nautical miles (20,000 km) surfaced at 10 knots (19 km/h)
- Endurance: 48 hours at 2 knots (4 km/h) submerged; 75 days on patrol
- Test depth: 300 ft (90 m)
- Complement: 6 officers, 54 enlisted
- Armament: 10 × 21-inch (533 mm) torpedo tubes; 6 forward, 4 aft; 24 torpedoes; 1 × 3-inch (76 mm) / 50 caliber deck gun; Bofors 40 mm and Oerlikon 20 mm cannon

USS Ray (SS/SSR-271), a Gato-class submarine, was the first ship of the United States Navy to be named for the ray, a fish characterized by a flat body, large pectoral fins, and a whiplike tail.

== Construction and commissioning ==
A fleet submarine, Ray was laid down on 20 July 1942; launched on 28 February 1943 by the Manitowoc Shipbuilding Company at Manitowoc, Wisconsin, sponsored by Mrs. S. C. Loomis; and commissioned on 27 July 1943.

== Service history ==
After training in Lake Michigan until 15 August 1943, Ray arrived at Coco Solo, Panama Canal Zone, via New Orleans, Louisiana, on 31 August 1943 for intensive training. Departing Panama on 5 October, she reached Brisbane, Australia, on 30 October 1943.

=== World War II ===
==== First war patrol, November–December 1943 ====
Departing Milne Bay, New Guinea, on 13 November for her first war patrol, Ray searched the area north of the Bismarck Archipelago. On the New Hanover-Truk shipping lane, she made radar contact with a three-ship convoy, escorted by three patrol craft. Attacking just before dawn she scored three hits on one of the freighters. Then, after evading the escorts' countermeasures, she followed the convoy and sank the converted gunboat Nikkai Maru with a spread of torpedoes. Before ending her patrol in December, Ray twice unsuccessfully attacked another convoy.

==== Second war patrol, December 1943–January 1944 ====
Ray's second patrol, 11 December 1943 to 12 January 1944 was in the Celebes-Ambon-Timor area. Near midnight on 26 December she sighted an unescorted tanker standing out from Tioro Strait. When the enemy ship reached open water, Ray fired a spread of torpedoes which stopped Kyoko Maru dead in the water and sent a huge mushroom of flame into the night sky as the target disintegrated.

On 1 January 1944, SS-271 intercepted two ships with escorts in the mouth of Ambon Bay, Java, and sank converted gunboat Okuyo Maru with three hits. The accompanying cargo ship tried to ram the submarine, and a combined aerial attack by patrol bombers and a sustained depth charge attack forced Ray to run deep. Three days later, following an unsuccessful attack on two cargo ships escorted by a Chidori-class torpedo boat, Ray returned to Fremantle.

==== Third war patrol, February–March 1944 ====
The third patrol, 6 February to 27 March, in the South China and Java Seas included the laying of a minefield off Saigon, Indochina, on 22 February. On the evening of 2 March, Ray intercepted a nine-ship convoy, and early on the 3rd came within firing range. A spread of four torpedoes damaged a tanker, but USS Bluefish crossed Ray's line of fire preventing a coup de grâce.

On 18 March Ray intercepted two Chidori-class torpedo boats and a patrol craft, fired six torpedoes, and dived deep. The submarine's crew heard an explosion. An intense depth charge attack followed. Ray escaped after sunset. The submarine ended her patrol at Fremantle.

==== Fourth war patrol, April–June 1944 ====
SS-271 departed Fremantle on 23 April for her fourth patrol. Her hunting ground was the Davao Gulf-Molucca Passage area. On the afternoon of 21 May, she spotted a nine-ship convoy escorted by surface ships and seaplanes. Ray surfaced that night, pursued the convoy, and attacked early the next morning. She fired six "fish" at a large transport and an overlapping smaller cargo vessel sinking transport Tempei Maru and causing undetermined damage to the freighter. A spread fired from Ray's stern tubes resulted in hits on a tanker, and possibly a minelayer. During the ensuing confusion, Ray escaped by running at flank speed on the surface.

Overtaking the disorganized convoy, during a tropical squall the next day, Ray fired on two radar contacts scoring hits. When the weather cleared, Ray saw one ship whose stack was going under and whose bow was rising from the water. The second was enveloped in a cloud of smoke and her decks awash. Ray dived deep to escape Japanese patrol aircraft, and the sinking was never confirmed by captured records. As no further suitable contacts were found, the submarine returned to Fremantle, arriving on 14 June.

==== Fifth war patrol, July–August 1944 ====
Her fifth patrol, 9 July to 31 August 1944, in the South China Sea and off the Philippines, drew blood on 18 July when Ray sank the tanker Janbi Maru. During the engagement, the submarine fired 22 torpedoes during six separate runs on the tanker which fired at Ray with her deck gun. Ray returned to Fremantle to reload, before returning to sea on 28 July.

At the south entrance to Makassar Strait, SS-271 intercepted a convoy of three ships and sank the cargo ship Kōshū Maru. Nine days later, she scored damaging hits on a transport and sank cargo ship Zuisho Maru. On 18 August, off northern Balabac Strait, Philippines, Ray closed a large convoy protected by surface escorts and planes, fired six "tin fish" at a tanker, and dived as a destroyer raced in to counterattack. Heavy explosions were heard, and a 2½-hour depth charge pounding followed. During the action, Ray heard another violent explosion and the sounds of a ship breaking up, as the tanker Nansei Maru went down. The submarine surfaced that evening and pursued the convoy into Palawan Bay.

Air cover prevented a daylight attack, but the wolfpack of Ray, USS Harder, and USS Haddo waited for the ships to come out. Ray fired her four remaining torpedoes at a passenger-cargo ship. Three fish missed, but the fourth hit the Taketoyo Maru amidships. The escorts forced Ray to dive, but she heard the 7,000-ton cargo vessel break up. The submarine underwent a sustained depth charge pounding, but escaped serious damage, returning to Fremantle 31 August.

==== Sixth war patrol, September–December 1944 ====
The submarine's sixth war patrol, 23 September to 8 December, took her to the familiar waters of the South China Sea. On 6 October and 7 October, she twice torpedoed a tanker, inflicting undetermined damage. Five days later, she destroyed the cargo ship Toko Maru with two direct hits and escaped a subsequent depth charge attack. On 14 October, while making a crash dive to escape a Japanese patrol plane, Ray's conning tower was flooded by an improperly secured hatch, but she was brought under control before reaching 85 feet (26 m). However, the damage forced the submarine to put into Mios Woendi for repairs during the last week of October.

On the afternoon of 1 November, Ray closed a five-ship convoy, sinking the cargo ship Horai Maru No. 7, and damaging a small tanker. Escaping the escorts, she landed men and supplies on the west coast of Mindoro, Philippines, picking up two downed Navy fliers, two Army POW's escaped from Corregidor, and an escaped Filipino political prisoner. On the night of 4 November, the sub sighted a cargo ship with its superstructure aflame, from an earlier attack by USS Bream. She launched two torpedoes, scoring a hit amidships and blowing away the bow of the Kagu Maru.

On 6 November, SS-271 intercepted a convoy of two heavy cruisers, and several transports, protected by surface and air escorts. Ray fired six rear torpedoes at the Kumano, damaged earlier by USS Raton. One of Ray's torpedoes hit Kumano's forward magazine, destroying its bow. Immediately prior to this, Ray had been forced to dive under Kumano in order to escape aerial and surface attack, and would subsequently ground in shoal water, shearing off her starboard sound head and blowing the sound head cable back into the torpedo room. To prevent further flooding, the submarine came to periscope depth where she saw the bowless cruiser being towed away by a transport. Her own damage and the Japanese escorts kept Ray from following up the attack. Kumano was destroyed off Luzon by Navy carrier planes 25 November.

On the night of 14 November, Ray made a surface attack on a three-ship convoy, blowing up an 800-ton frigate with a direct hit in its magazines. Two days later she launched two torpedoes at a grounded transport, but could not complete the attack because of minefields and shoal water.

On 19 November, she rescued a downed pilot from USS Cowpens. The patrol terminated at Pearl Harbor 8 December 1944. From there the submarine headed east, arriving at Mare Island Naval Shipyard 16 December for a major overhaul. Departing San Francisco 26 March, she proceeded via Pearl Harbor to Guam, arriving at Apra Harbor on 29 April 1945.

==== Seventh war patrol, April–June 1945 ====
Ray cleared Guam for her seventh war patrol 30 April to 16 June 1945. On 7 May while on lifeguard duty off Kyūshū she rescued 10 men from a downed B-29. On the night of 15 May – 16 May, she picked up the 10 crewmen of a PBM Mariner patrol bomber which was foundering in heavy seas. Ray transferred the rescued crews to USS Lionfish and USS Pompon and continued her patrol.

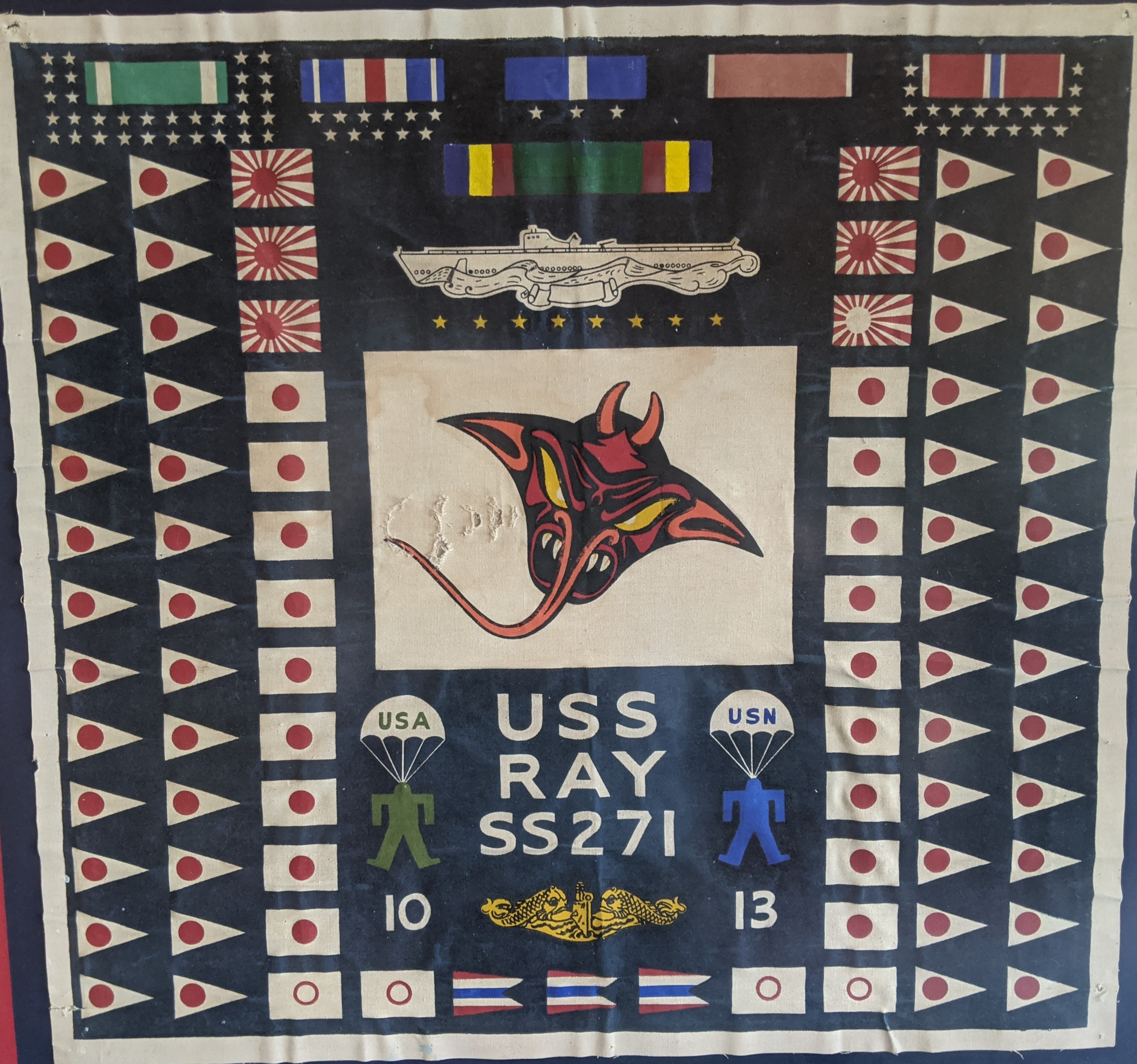
SS-271 Battle Flag

On 19 May, she intercepted three small freighters. Her torpedoes ran beneath the targets, and the "freighters", a disguised hunter-killer group, converged on the area where Ray had dived, laying a depth charge pattern. The submarine surfaced and fired her deck gun at her pursuers as she dashed away at flank speed. The remainder of the patrol was devoted to attacking patrol craft and coastal vessels with gunfire until it ended at Midway on 16 June.

==== Eighth war patrol, July–August 1945 ====
Her eighth and final wartime patrol, 11 July to 13 August, took Ray to the Gulf of Siam. On the evening of 7 August, she sank 16 small craft by gunfire off Bang Saponnoi, Thailand. That night two boarding parties from the submarine burned seven Junks anchored north of Lem Chong Pra. The submarine arrived at Subic Bay for more ammunition on 13 August, where her patrol was terminated with the end of hostilities on 15 August 1945.

=== Post-World War II ===
==== 1945–1947 ====
Departing Subic Bay on 14 August 1945, Ray proceeded via Saipan, Pearl Harbor, and the Panama Canal to Naval Submarine Base New London at New London, Connecticut, which she reached on 5 October 1945. She served in a training capacity at New London until 12 February 1947, when she was decommissioned and placed in reserve.

==== Radar picket submarine (SSR-271), 1952–1958 ====
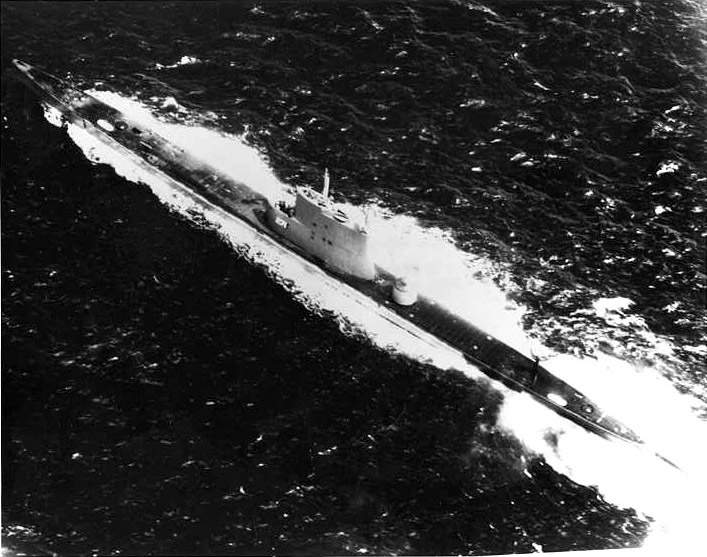
Ray as a radar picket submarine (SSR-271).

In December 1950, Ray was towed to the Philadelphia Navy Yard in Philadelphia, Pennsylvania, for conversion to a radar picket submarine. Accordingly redesignated SSR-271 on 3 January 1951, she was recommissioned on 13 August 1952, Lieutenant Commander A. C. Burley in command.

Ray departed Philadelphia on 27 March 1953. The remainder of the year was occupied in fleet training operations along the United States East Coast and in the Caribbean.

From 1 March to 26 May 1954, she deployed to the 6th Fleet, serving as a picket ship. Returning to her homeport of Norfolk 26 May, she participated in joint United States-Canadian exercises off Nova Scotia in July and August. The remainder of 1954 and 1955 were spent in fleet exercises, type training, and an overhaul at Charleston Navy Yard from April to November 1955.

Deploying again to the Mediterranean as a radar picket submarine from 5 March to 4 June 1956, she operated with NATO and U.S. Navy units. The remaining months of Ray's operating schedule in 1956 and 1957 were involved in type training and fleet exercises in the Atlantic and Caribbean, including representing Submarine Force, U.S. Atlantic Fleet, at the International Naval Review at Hampton Roads in June 1957 and participating in the NATO Exercise "Strikeback" held off Scotland, France, and Portugal in September and October 1957. The early part of 1958 was spent in fleet exercises off the east coast and the Caribbean. She departed Norfolk 30 June 1958 and entered the Charleston Navy Yard for inactivation.

== Decommissioning and disposal ==
Ray was decommissioned and placed in reserve on 30 September 1958 and was struck from the Navy List on 1 April 1960. Her hulk was sold for scrap to the Commercial Metals Company on 18 December 1960.

== Honors and awards ==
For action during World War II, Ray was awarded seven battle stars, the Navy Unit Commendation (for patrol 6), and the Philippine Republic Presidential Unit Citation.

- Navy Unit Commendation
- Philippine Republic Presidential Unit Citation
