= USS Marlin (SST-2) =

Submarine of the United States

Coordinates: 41.27625°N 95.901107°W

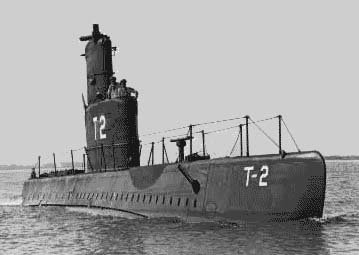
- USS Marlin (SST-2) in the late 1950s.

History

United States
- Name: USS Marlin (SST-2)
- Namesake: As USS Marlin: The marlin, a large game fish
- Builder: General Dynamics Electric Boat, Groton, Connecticut
- Laid down: 1 May 1952
- Launched: 14 October 1953
- Sponsored by: Mrs. William R. DeLoach
- Commissioned: 20 November 1953, as USS T-2 (SST-2)
- Decommissioned: 31 January 1973
- Renamed: USS Marlin (SST-2), 15 May 1956
- Stricken: 31 January 1973
- Status: Museum ship, 20 August 1974

General characteristics
- Class & type: T-1-class training submarine
- Displacement: 303 long tons (308 t) surfaced; 347 long tons (353 t) submerged
- Length: 131 ft 3 in (40.01 m)
- Beam: 13 ft 7 in (4.14 m)
- Draft: 12 ft 2 in (3.71 m)
- Propulsion: Diesel-electric, single screw
- Speed: 10 knots (19 km/h; 12 mph) surfaced; 10.5 knots (19.4 km/h; 12.1 mph) submerged
- Complement: 2 officers, 16 enlisted men
- Armament: 1 × 21 inch (533 mm) torpedo tube

USS Marlin (SST-2), originally USS T-2 (SST-2), was a T-1-class training submarine in commission from 1953 to 1973. She was the second submarine of the United States Navy to be named for the marlin, a large game fish. Except for the first 25 early development pre-World War I submarines, she was one of the smallest operational submarines ever built for the U.S. Navy.

== Construction and commissioning ==
T-2 was laid down on 1 May 1952 by the Electric Boat Division of General Dynamics Corporation in Groton, Connecticut. She was launched on 14 October 1953, sponsored by Mrs. William R. DeLoach, and commissioned as USS T-2 on 20 November 1953. (Note: The Dictionary of American Naval Fighting Ships and NavSource both state that Marlin was commissioned in 1953 and never served in a non-commissioned status. However, a Welcome Aboard program providing the ships history states the ship was "placed in service on 29 November" before moving to her "present home port of Key West, Florida", but also includes pages from after she became a museum in Nebraska. The status "In Service" was often used in this period for training ships, in particular Naval Reserve destroyers and ocean escorts, and is still used for yard and district craft.)

== Service history ==
After shakedown in the Massachusetts Bay area, T-2, got underway from New London, Connecticut, in late January 1954 for her home port at Naval Station Key West at Key West, Florida. Assigned to Submarine Squadron 12, Submarine Force, United States Atlantic Fleet, she immediately began operations in the sector from southern Florida to Guantánamo Bay, Cuba. For a decade and a half she performed valuable service as a target and training ship and helped to evaluate submarine and antisubmarine warfare equipment and tactics.

Renamed Marlin on 15 May 1956, the submarine deployed to Guantanamo Bay for services to the Fleet Training Group in January 1956, July and August 1958, March 1960, and December 1961. In March 1963, Marlin participated in the National Defense Industrial Association (NDIA) demonstration.

From 1963, Marlin performed mainly target duty for both surface and air antisubmarine units at the Fleet Sonar School at Key West.

In addition to target and training duty, Marlin participated in various fleet operations. From 7 March 1965 to 4 April 1965, for example, Marlin joined her sister ship USS Mackerel (SST-1) and attack submarines USS Amberjack (SS-522), USS Batfish (SS-310), and USS Chivo (SS-341), along with a task force under Commander, Mine Force, in participating in mine warfare maneuvers.

== Decommissioning ==
Marlin and her sister ship Mackerel were decommissioned on 31 January 1973 in a dual ceremony at Naval Station Key West. Both also were stricken from the Naval Vessel Register that day.

== Museum ship ==
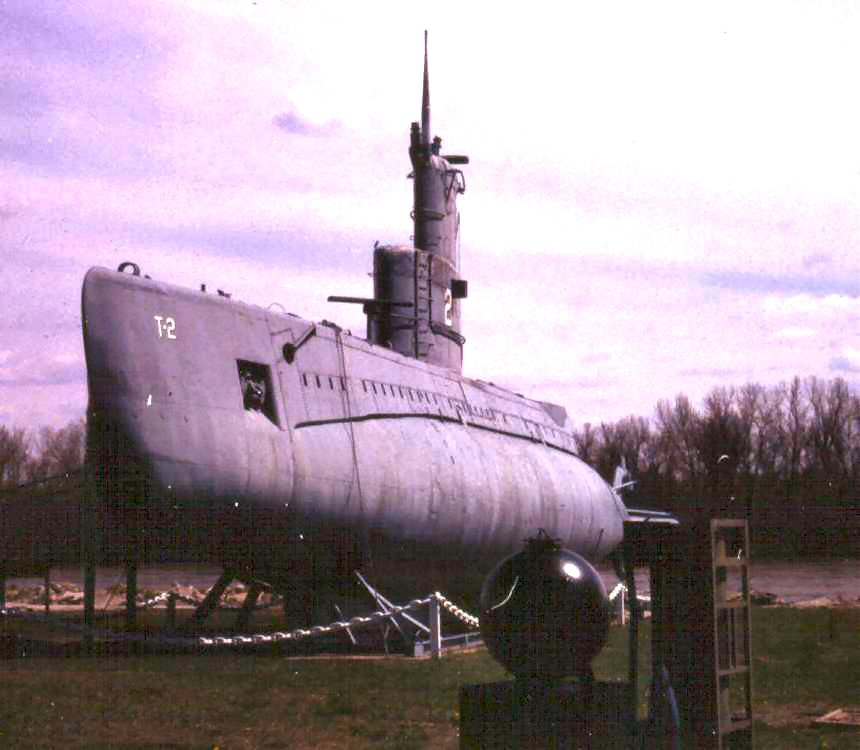
USS Marlin on display at Freedom Park, Omaha, Nebraska, in 1995.

On 15 August 1973, the U.S. Navy donated Marlin for use as a museum ship. On 20 August 1974, she was assigned for display as a memorial submarine in Freedom Park at the Greater Omaha Marina at 2000 North 25th Street, in Omaha, Nebraska.
