= USS Powell =

Several ships of the United States Navy have borne some version of the name Powell.

- USS Alert (1861), steamship named A. C. Powell purchased by the Union Navy during the first year of the American Civil War
- USS William T. Powell (DE-213), a Buckley-class destroyer escort
- USS Halsey Powell (DD-686), a Fletcher-class destroyer
