= T-1-class submarine =

Pair of submarines

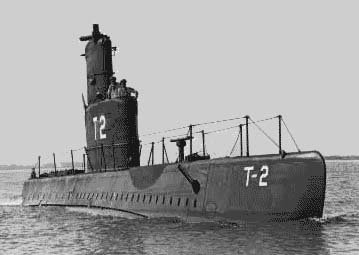
- USS Marlin (SST-2) in the late 1950s

Class overview
- Builders: Electric Boat Division of General Dynamics Corporation, Groton, Connecticut
- Operators: United States Navy
- Built: 1952–1953
- In commission: 1953–1973
- Planned: 2
- Completed: 2
- Retired: 2
- Preserved: 1

General characteristics
- Type: Training submarine
- Displacement: 303 long tons (308 t) surfaced; 347 long tons (353 t) submerged
- Length: 131 ft 3 in (40 m)
- Beam: 13 ft 7 in (4.14 m)
- Draft: 12 ft (3.7 m)
- Propulsion: 2 × General Motors Diesel engines (total 250 shp (190 kW)), 1 × Elliott electric motor (380 shp (280 kW)), 1 × battery, 1 shaft
- Speed: 10 knots (19 km/h; 12 mph) surfaced; 10.5 knots (19.4 km/h; 12.1 mph) submerged
- Range: 2,000 nautical miles (3,700 km) surfaced at 10 knots (19 km/h)
- Endurance: Submerged: 90 minutes at full speed, 102 hours at 3 knots
- Test depth: 225 ft (69 m)
- Complement: 2 officers, 12 enlisted men
- Armament: 1 × 21-inch (533 mm) torpedo tube

The T-1-class submarines were a pair of submarines designed by the United States Navy and built in the early 1950s for use in training submarine personnel and testing submarine equipment. Both submarines of the class served in these roles for over 19 years.

== Design and construction ==
Except for the first 25 early development pre-World War I submarines, the T-1 class were among the smallest operational submarines ever built for the United States Navy. The first unit was planned under project SCB 68 as an experimental auxiliary submarine with hull number AGSS-570, but instead was built as the training submarine USS T-1 with hull number SST-1. Her sister ship, USS T-2, was planned as SST-2 from the beginning.

The T-1 class were built to resemble the 160-ton, 16-crew Soviet M-class submarines, of which over 100 were in service in 1950. It was thought the M class would be effective in restricted waters such as the Baltic Sea and parts of the Mediterranean Sea. The T-1 class were built to train anti-submarine warfare (ASW) forces in countering small submarines.

Both submarines were constructed by the Electric Boat Division of the General Dynamics Corporation at Groton, Connecticut, in 1952–1953.

== Service history ==
Both submarines entered service in 1953 and were renamed in 1956, T-1 becoming USS Mackerel (SST-1) and T-2 becoming USS Marlin (SST-2). Both operated primarily in Florida and Caribbean waters to train submarine personnel, serve as targets for sonar and antisubmarine warfare training, and test submarine equipment. They were decommissioned simultaneously in a combined ceremony in 1973.

== Ships ==
=== USS Mackerel (SST-1), ex-USS T-1, ex-AGSS-570 ===
USS Mackerel (SST-1), planned as AGSS-570, was commissioned as T-1 (SST-1) in October 1953 and decommissioned in January 1973. A highlight of her career was testing of equipment for the NR-1 Deep Submergence Craft in 1966–1967. Mackerel was sunk as a target in 1978.

=== USS Marlin (SST-2), ex-USS T-2 ===
USS Marlin (SST-2) was commissioned as USS T-2 (SST-2) in November 1953 and decommissioned in January 1973. Donated as a museum ship in August 1973, she was assigned on 20 August 1974 to go on display at Freedom Park in Omaha, Nebraska.
