= USS Mackerel (SST-1) =

T-1-class of training submarines, sunk as a target

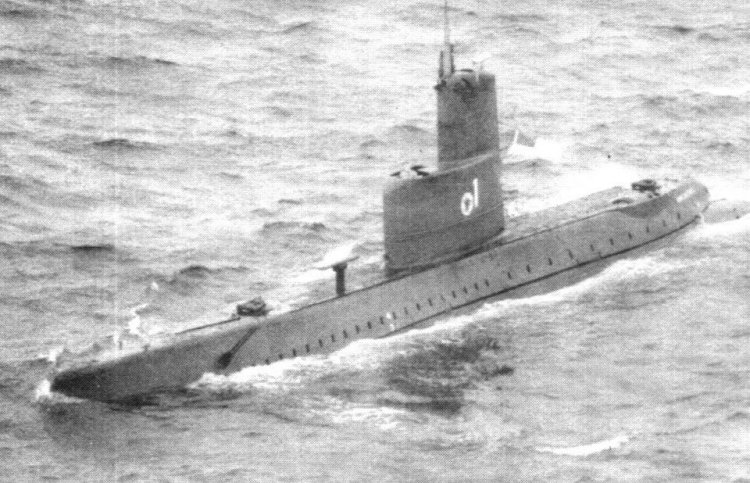
- USS Mackerel (SST-1)

History

United States
- Name: USS T-1 (1953-1956); USS Mackerel (1956-1973)
- Namesake: As Mackerel: The mackerel, a sport and game fish
- Builder: General Dynamics Electric Boat, Groton, Connecticut
- Laid down: 1 April 1952
- Launched: 17 July 1953
- Sponsored by: Mrs. Charles R. Muir
- Commissioned: 9 October 1953
- Decommissioned: 31 January 1973
- In service: 9 October 1953, as USS T-1 (SST-1)
- Renamed: USS Mackerel (SST-1), 15 July 1956
- Reclassified: From auxiliary submarine (AGSS-570) to training submarine (SST-1) prior to commissioning
- Stricken: 31 January 1973
- Fate: Sunk as target 18 October 1978

General characteristics
- Class & type: T-1-class training submarine
- Displacement: 303 long tons (308 t) surfaced; 347 long tons (353 t) submerged
- Length: 131 ft 3 in (40 m)
- Beam: 13 ft 7 in (4.14 m)
- Draft: 12 ft (3.7 m)
- Propulsion: diesel-electric, single screw
- Speed: 10 knots (19 km/h; 12 mph) surfaced; 10.5 knots (19.4 km/h; 12.1 mph) submerged
- Complement: 2 officers, 12 enlisted men
- Armament: 1 × 21 inch (533 mm) torpedo tube

USS Mackerel (SST-1), originally known as USS T-1 (SST-1), was the lead ship of the T-1-class of training submarines. She was the second submarine of the United States Navy named for the mackerel, a common food and sport fish, and was in service from 1953 to 1973. She was one of the smallest operational submarines ever built for the U.S. Navy.

== Construction and commissioning ==
T-1 was originally planned as an experimental auxiliary submarine with hull number AGSS-570, but she was redesignated as a training submarine (SST-1) and her hull number was changed to SST-1. She was laid down on 1 April 1952, at the Electric Boat Division of General Dynamics Corporation at Groton, Connecticut. She was launched on 17 July 1953, sponsored by Mrs. Charles R. Muir, and placed in non-commissioned (Note: Per the Dictionary of American Naval Fighting Ships, which makes no mention of a commissioning, stating merely that Mackerel was "placed in service" (implying a non-commissioned status) in 1953. The Dictionary of American Naval Fighting Ships and NavSource both state that Mackerel's only sister ship, USS Marlin (SST-2), was commissioned in 1953 six weeks after Mackerel entered service and never served in a non-commissioned status. It would be strange for one submarine to spend almost all of her career in a non-commissioned status and her sister to serve throughout hers in commission, but no source explains this anomaly. It also is odd that NavSource states that Mackerel eventually was commissioned in 1971, but provides no specific date in 1971 for Mackerel's commissioning, raising the possibility that her commissioning did not, in fact, occur in 1971 and may well have occurred in 1953.) service as USS T-1 on 9 October 1953.

== Service history ==
=== Training, target, and equipment testing services, 1954–1966 ===
After completing sea trials in the New London, and Massachusetts Bay areas, T-1 departed in February 1954 for Key West, Florida. Arriving at Key West, she commenced operations with submarine and antisubmarine forces in the areas of southern Florida and Guantanamo Bay, Cuba, providing services to the Fleet Training Group working up recently constructed and recently overhauled antisubmarine warships.

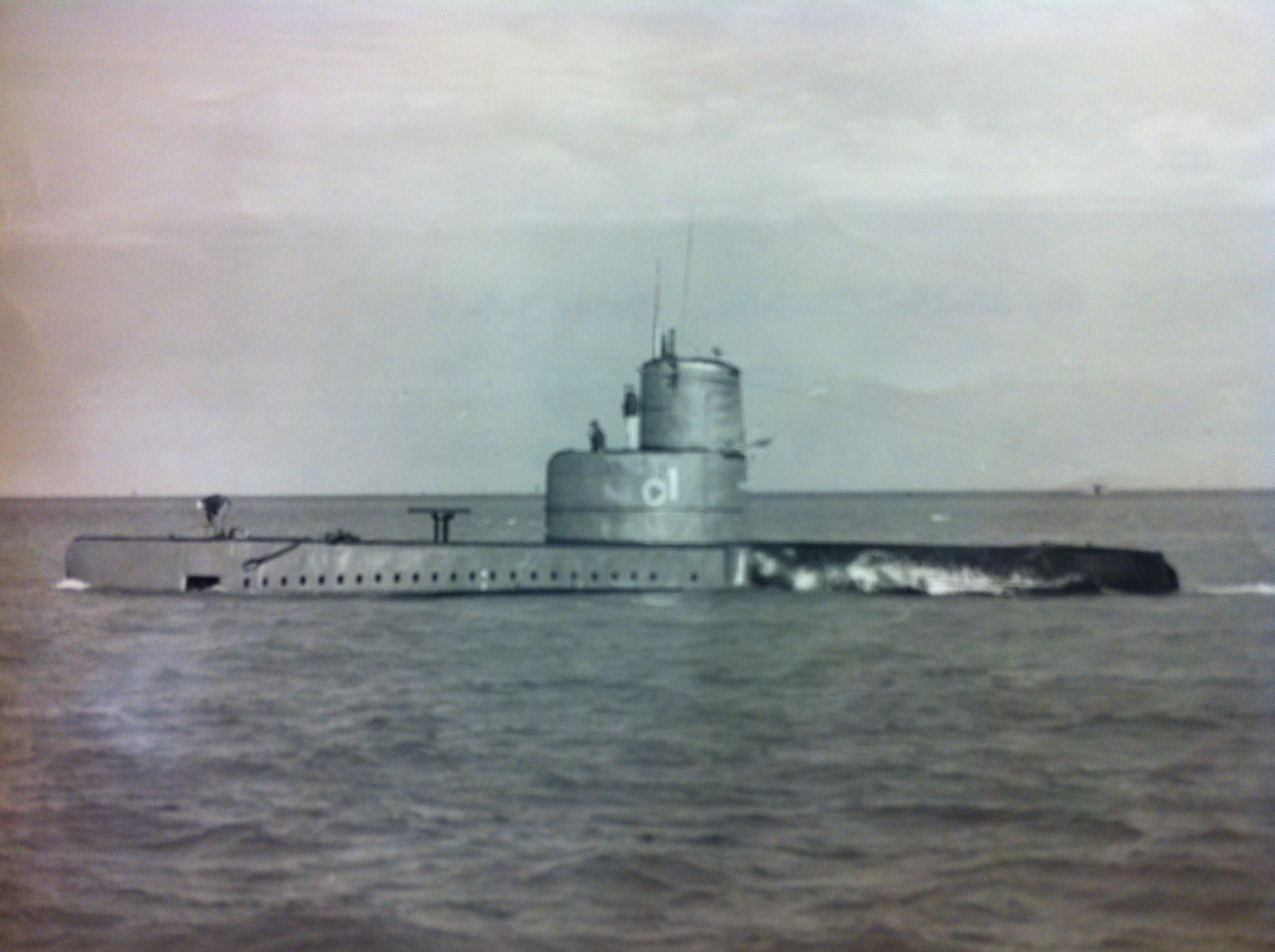
A photo taken from the submarine tender USS Bushnell (AS-15) of USS Mackerel (SST-1) off Key West, Florida, on 3 March 1964 with a "rubber girdle" installed.

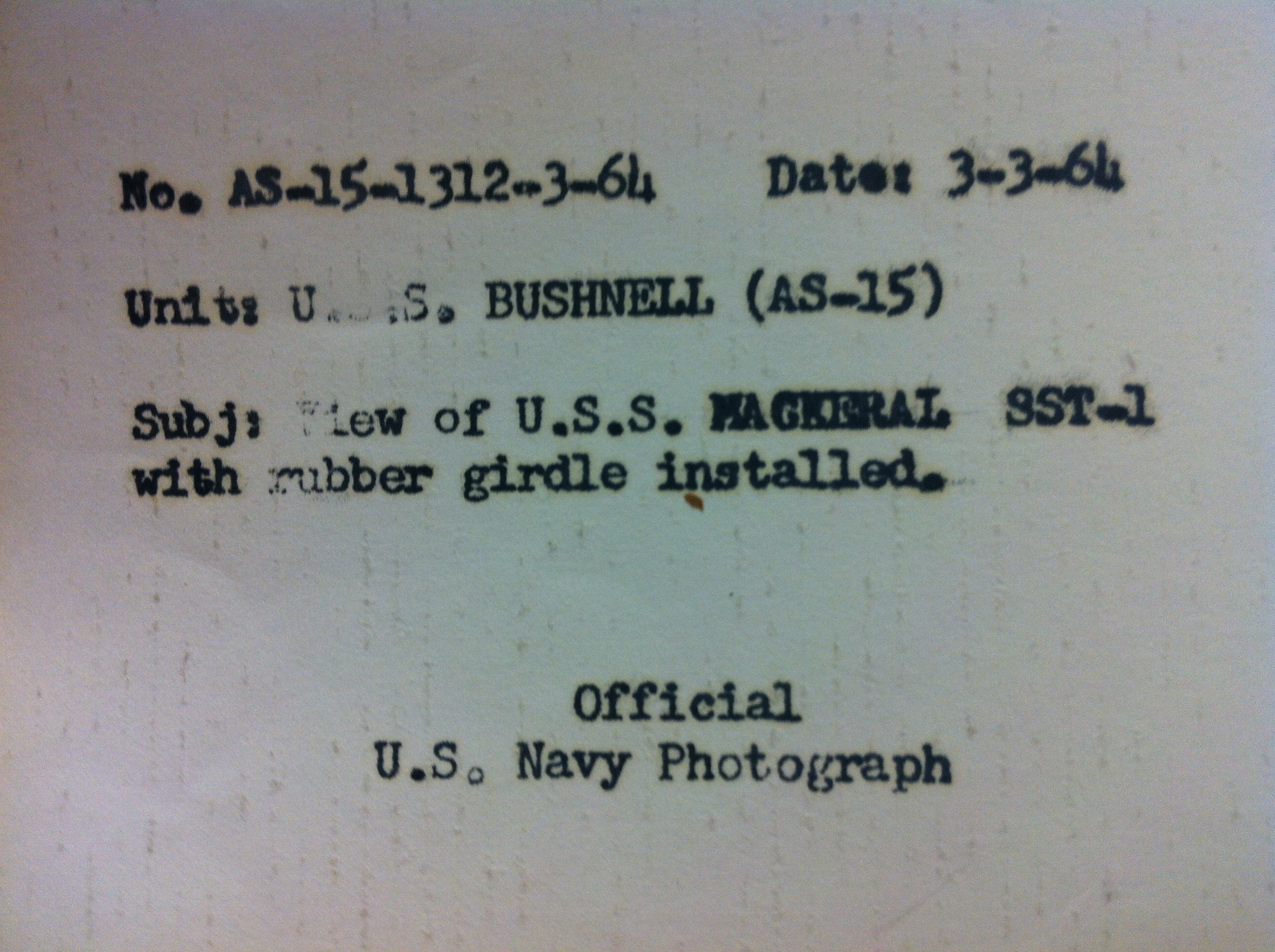
Original U.S. Navy photo documentation on reverse.

On 15 July 1956, T-1 was renamed Mackerel, but retained her hull number, SST-1.

Following her renaming, Mackerel participated in fleet exercises off the United States East Coast, mainly conducting training assignments and providing services as a target, including some for the Fleet Sonar School at Key West. She also made several cruises testing new equipment for submarines. On 2 April 1957, she departed Key West on a special sound-damping project during a voyage to Annapolis, Maryland. She conducted more training and target cruises into the early 1960s.

In 1963, Mackerel conducted the first of her test and evaluation voyages. Departing Key West on 8 July 1963, she sailed to the British West Indies where she tested acoustical developments in submarine hulls for a two‑week period in waters near the British West Indies. In addition to resumption of her routine duties, she again operated in the West Indies in February 1964, again performing tasks related to evaluating submarine-hull acoustic developments.

From 7 March 1965 to 4 April 1965, Mackerel joined her sister ship USS Marlin (SST-2) and attack submarines USS Amberjack (SS-522), USS Batfish (SS-310), and USS Chivo (SS-341), along with a task force under Commander, Mine Force, in participating in mine warfare maneuvers.

=== Testing equipment for NR-1, 1966-1967 ===
During May and June 1966, Electric Boat installed special equipment in Mackerel at Groton. Mackerel then transited south to Key West, arriving there on 26 June 1966. At Key West, she conducted experimental work during the rest of 1966 and in early 1967 to acquire data to be used in the development of future U.S. Navy submarines. She evaluated equipment intended for the NR-1 Deep Submergence Craft, including keel-mounted wheels for rolling over the ocean floor, thrusters, external television cameras, a manipulator arm, and experimental sonar. Mackerel "bottomed"—deliberately settled on the sea floor—some 225 times during the nine-month evaluation period. She completed this assignment during March 1967, after which she had some of her special equipment removed. At the same time she undertook the additional task of providing shiphandling training for submarine force junior officers. During June and July 1967, while Mackerel in drydock at Key West, additional special project equipment was removed from her.

=== Target services, 1967-1973 ===
Mackerel resumed operations at Key West in 1967, running submerged to serve as a target for vessels used to train sonar operators at the Fleet Sonar School; at the same time, she undertook the additional task of providing shiphandling training for submarine force junior officers. She also acted as a target for surface and air antisubmarine warfare forces practicing off the Florida coast and in the Caribbean during the late 1960s and early 1970s. In 1971 and 1972, she provided target and training services for antisubmarine warfare units of the United States Atlantic Fleet in the Key West and the Mayport/Jacksonville, Florida, operating areas. Apparently, her non-commissioned service period ended when she was finally commissioned sometime in 1971. (Note: Per NavSource; the Dictionary of American Naval Fighting Ships makes no mention of a commissioning, stating merely that Mackerel was "placed in service" (implying a non-commissioned status) in 1953, and has not been updated since 1969, making any mention of a commissioning in 1971 impossible. The Dictionary of American Naval Fighting Ships and NavSource both state that Mackerel's only sister ship, USS Marlin (SST-2), was commissioned in 1953 six weeks after Mackerel entered service and never served in a non-commissioned status. It would be strange for one submarine to spend almost all of her career in a non-commissioned status and her sister to serve throughout hers in commission, but no source explains this anomaly. It also is odd that NavSource provides no specific date in 1971 for Mackerel's commissioning, raising the possibility that her commissioning did not, in fact, occur in 1971 and may well have occurred in 1953.)

Mackerel made her last dive on 21 July 1972. After that, she remained in service with a reduced crew and conducted junior officer and midshipman training on the surface regularly through October 1972. She was taken out of service on 3 January 1973.

== Decommissioning and disposal ==
Mackerel and her sister USS Marlin (SST-2) were decommissioned on 31 January 1973 in a dual ceremony at Naval Station Key West. Both also were struck from the Naval Vessel Register that day.

Mackerel was sunk as a target off Puerto Rico on 18 October 1978.
