= USS Macabi =

Submarine of the United States

USS Macabi (SS-375)
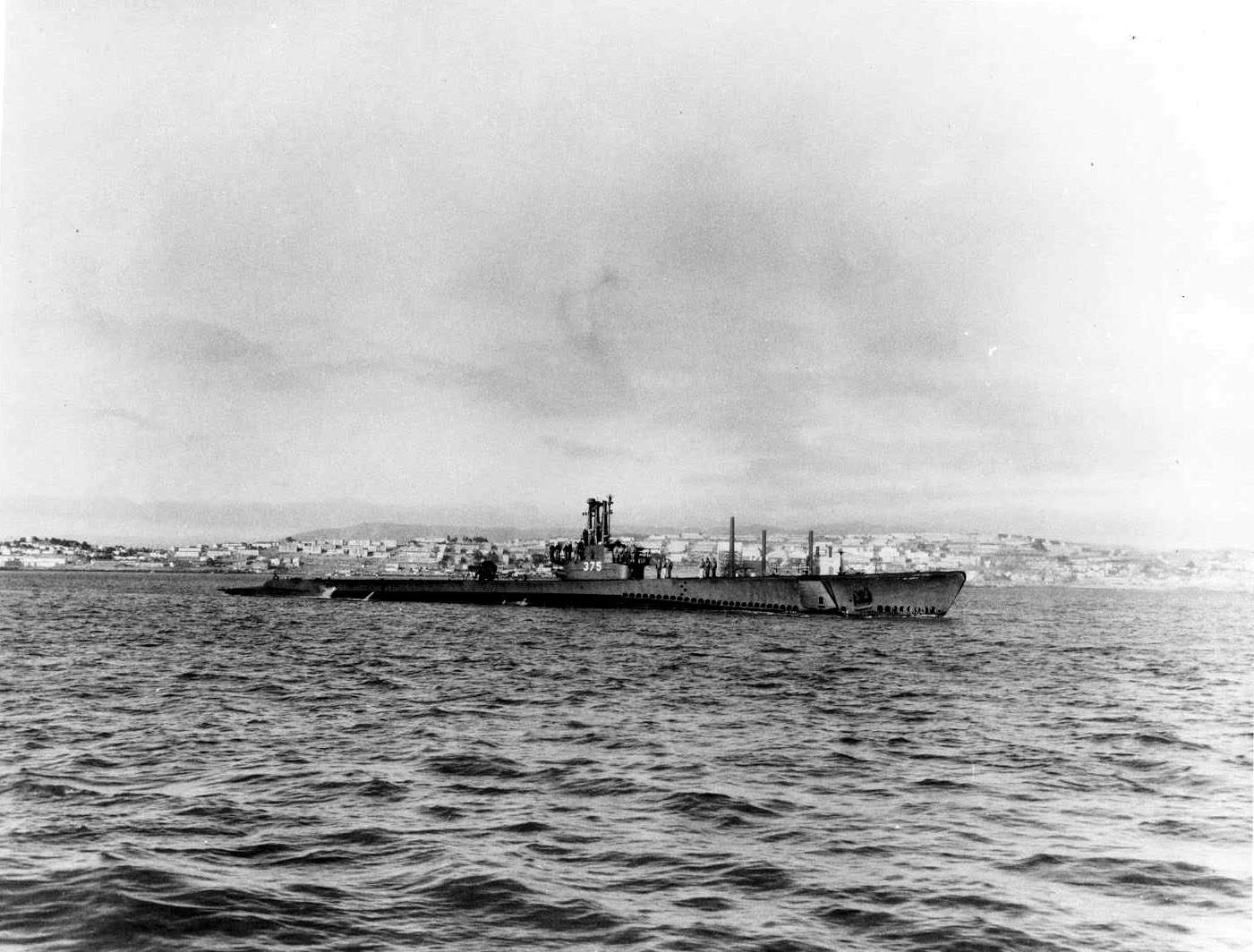
- Macabi (SS-375), possibly just prior to being transferred to Argentina 11 August 1960.

History

United States
- Name: USS Macabi (SS-375)
- Builder: Manitowoc Shipbuilding Company, Manitowoc, Wisconsin
- Laid down: 1 May 1944
- Launched: 19 September 1944
- Commissioned: 29 March 1945
- Decommissioned: 16 June 1946
- Recommissioned: 6 May 1960
- Decommissioned: 11 August 1960
- Stricken: 1 September 1971
- Fate: Transferred to Argentina 11 August 1960, Sold to Argentina 1 September 1971
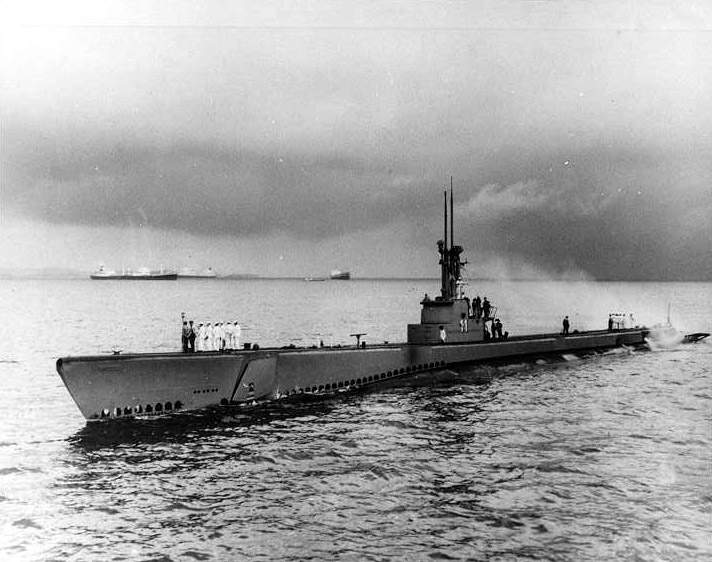
- ARA Santa Fe on trials after transfer to Argentina.

Argentina
- Name: ARA Santa Fe (S-11)
- Acquired: 11 August 1960
- Commissioned: 3 November 1960
- Decommissioned: 1971
- Fate: Broken up 1974 for use as spare parts

General characteristics
- Class & type: Balao-class diesel-electric submarine
- Displacement: 1,526 tons (1,550 t) surfaced; 2,424 tons (2,463 t) submerged
- Length: 311 ft 9 in (95.02 m)
- Beam: 27 ft 3 in (8.31 m)
- Draft: 16 ft 10 in (5.13 m) maximum
- Propulsion: 4 × General Motors Model 16-278A V16 diesel engines driving electrical generators; 2 × 126-cell Sargo batteries; 4 × high-speed General Electric electric motors with reduction gears; 2 × propellers; 5,400 shp (4.0 MW) surfaced; 2,740 shp (2.0 MW) submerged
- Speed: 20.25 knots (38 km/h) surfaced; 8.75 knots (16 km/h) submerged
- Range: 11,000 nautical miles (20,000 km) surfaced at 10 knots (19 km/h; 12 mph)
- Endurance: 48 hours at 2 knots (3.7 km/h; 2.3 mph) submerged; 75 days on patrol
- Test depth: 400 ft (120 m)
- Complement: 10 officers, 70–71 enlisted
- Armament: 10 × 21-inch (533 mm) torpedo tubes; 6 forward, 4 aft; 24 torpedoes; 1 × 5-inch (127 mm) / 25 caliber deck gun; Bofors 40 mm and Oerlikon 20 mm cannon

USS Macabi (SS-375) was a Balao-class submarine of the United States Navy, named for the macabi, a bonefish (Albula vulpes) living in tropical seas and off the American coasts as far north as San Diego and Long Island and reaching a length of 3 feet (1 m).

== USS Macabi (SS-375) ==
Macabi was laid down 1 May 1944 by the Manitowoc Shipbuilding Company at Manitowoc, Wisconsin; launched 19 September 1944, sponsored by Mrs. Arthur S. Carpender, wife of Rear Admiral Carpender; and commissioned 29 March 1945.

Following trials on Lake Michigan, Macabi, on 19 April 1945, entered a floating drydock at Lockport, Ill., to transit the Chicago Canal to the Mississippi River, and arrived New Orleans 26 April `1945. Three days later she left for shakedown operations off Panama.

On 3 June 1945 Macabi departed Balboa, Canal Zone, for final training at Pearl Harbor before departing 9 July 1945 for the Caroline Islands via Guam, Marianas. She went on lifeguard station off Truk on arriving 21 July 1945. Some 10 days later Macabi was forced to dive to avoid two aerial bombs off Moen Island.

She returned to Apra Harbor, Guam, for repairs 4 August through 13 August 1945; and was on her way back to Truk when hostilities with Japan were terminated. Macabi was then ordered home, touching Pearl Harbor 27 to 29 August 1945 on the way. Arriving San Francisco 5 September 1945, she entered Mare Island Navy Yard 12 December 1945 for inactivation overhaul and decommissioned 16 June 1946.

== ARA Santa Fe (S-11) ==
On 1 April 1960 the US Navy and the Argentine Navy signed an agreement to transfer two submarines, Macabi and Lamprey (SS-372). Macabi was loaned to Argentina under the Military Assistance Program on 11 August 1960 and renamed ARA Santa Fe (S-11), while Lamprey was renamed ARA Santiago del Estero (S-12). The commander of Santa Fe was Capitán de Corbeta Julio A. Aureggi. The submarines left San Francisco on 23 September 1960, arriving at Mar del Plata Naval Base on 30 November of the same year. Santa Fe was struck from the US Naval Register, and sold outright to Argentina on 1 September 1971; after being employed as a training boat, she was decommissioned by the Argentine Navy and broken up for spare parts in 1974.
