= USS Sarda =

Submarine of the United States

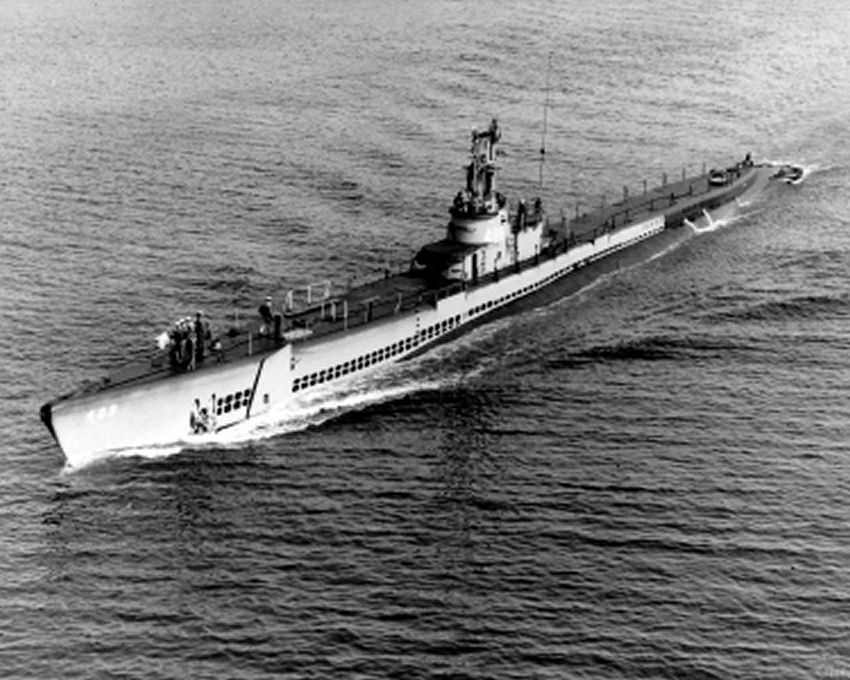

History

United States
- Name: USS Sarda (SS-488)
- Namesake: Sarda, a genus of game fish
- Builder: Portsmouth Naval Shipyard, Kittery, Maine
- Laid down: 12 April 1945
- Launched: 24 August 1945
- Sponsored by: Mrs. James J. Heffernan
- Commissioned: 19 April 1946
- Decommissioned: 1 June 1964
- Stricken: 1 June 1964
- Fate: Sold for scrap 14 May 1965

General characteristics
- Class & type: Tench-class diesel-electric submarine
- Displacement: 1,570 tons (1,595 t) surfaced; 2,414 tons (2,453 t) submerged
- Length: 311 ft 8 in (95.00 m)
- Beam: 27 ft 4 in (8.33 m)
- Draft: 17 ft 0 in (5.18 m) maximum
- Propulsion: 4 × Fairbanks-Morse Model 38D8-⅛ 10-cylinder opposed piston diesel engines driving electrical generators; 2 × 126-cell Sargo batteries; 2 × low-speed direct-drive Elliott electric motors; two propellers; 5,400 shp (4.0 MW) surfaced; 2,740 shp (2.0 MW) submerged
- Speed: 20.25 knots (38 km/h) surfaced; 8.75 knots (16 km/h) submerged
- Range: 11,000 nautical miles (20,000 km) surfaced at 10 knots (19 km/h)
- Endurance: 48 hours at 2 knots (3.7 km/h) submerged; 75 days on patrol
- Test depth: 400 ft (120 m)
- Complement: 10 officers, 71 enlisted
- Armament: 10 × 21-inch (533 mm) torpedo tubes; (6 forward, 4 aft); 28 torpedoes; 1 × 5-inch (127 mm) / 25 caliber deck gun; Bofors 40 mm and Oerlikon 20 mm cannon

USS Sarda (SS-488), a Tench-class submarine, was the only ship of the United States Navy to be named for the sarda, a game fish of the central, southwestern, and western Pacific Ocean.

== Construction and commissioning ==
Sarda′s construction was financed by bonds purchased during the Seventh War Loan by the residents of Lynn, Massachusetts. Her keel was laid down on 12 April 1945 at the Portsmouth Navy Yard in Kittery, Maine. She was launched on 24 August 1945 sponsored by Mrs. Heffernan, the wife of James J. Heffernan, Congressman from New York.

Since World War II had ended in mid-August 1945, just weeks before Sarda′s launch, Sarda no longer was needed for wartime service, and the decision as to whether to commission or scrap her had to be made. Sarda’s prospective commanding officer — Commander Chester W. Nimitz, Jr., son of Admiral Chester W. Nimitz — grew frustrated with the debate over the fate of his submarine. During the months of waiting, he received a small plaque from his father inscribed Illegitimi non Carborundum — "Don't Let the Bastards Grind You Up."

During the period between launching and commissioning, Sarda was fitted out with an extra large conning tower to permit installation of experimental equipment. She eventually was commissioned on 19 April 1946 with Commander Nimitz in command.

== Service history ==
=== 1946–1959 ===
After commissioning, Sarda conducted her shakedown cruise in the Caribbean Sea, then returned north to commence experimental work from New London, Connecticut. There, she joined Submarine Division 22 of Submarine Squadron 2, and for the next four years tested new equipment for the Underwater Sound Laboratory at Fort Trumbull in New London and evaluated new ship control procedures. In the fall of 1949, she was transferred to Submarine Division 21, and her primary mission was shifted from test and evaluation work to school ship duties. She continued that work through the 1950s, interrupting it only for type training; mine planting exercises; antisubmarine warfare exercises; fleet exercises; occasional participation in North Atlantic Treaty Organization (NATO) or joint United States-Canada exercises off the coasts of the Atlantic Provinces and northern New England; and, from January to June 1957, operations in the Caribbean Sea and from the Guiana and Brazilian basins for the United States Hydrographic Office. On her return, she resumed her primary function, training submarine school students.

=== 1960–1964 ===
In the early 1960s, Sarda continued training work, but devoted more time to providing services to antisubmarine warfare units conducting exercises. During the winter of 1960, she provided services to 92 surface ships and 14 air squadrons participating in annual training exercises in the Caribbean. In early 1961, she became the first American submarine to complete 11,000 dives. During the winter of 1962, she again returned to the Caribbean for an extended stay and, when not employed in servicing United States Atlantic Fleet air and surface antisubmarine warfare units, she tested and evaluated acoustic torpedoes. In the winter of 1963, she deployed to the Mediterranean Sea, where she operated with the United States Sixth Fleet, and, on her return to New London in late May 1963, she resumed school ship duties.

== Decommissioning and disposal ==
In April 1964, Sarda was declared to be surplus to U.S.Navy needs. She spent May 1964 in port at New London preparing for inactivation, and on 1 June 1964 she was decommissioned. Her name was struck from the Naval Vessel Register on the same day, and her hulk was sold for scrapping in March 1965.

== Commemoration ==
Sarda′s name plate is on display at the Freedom Park in Omaha, Nebraska.
