= USS William T. Powell =

Buckley-class destroyer escort

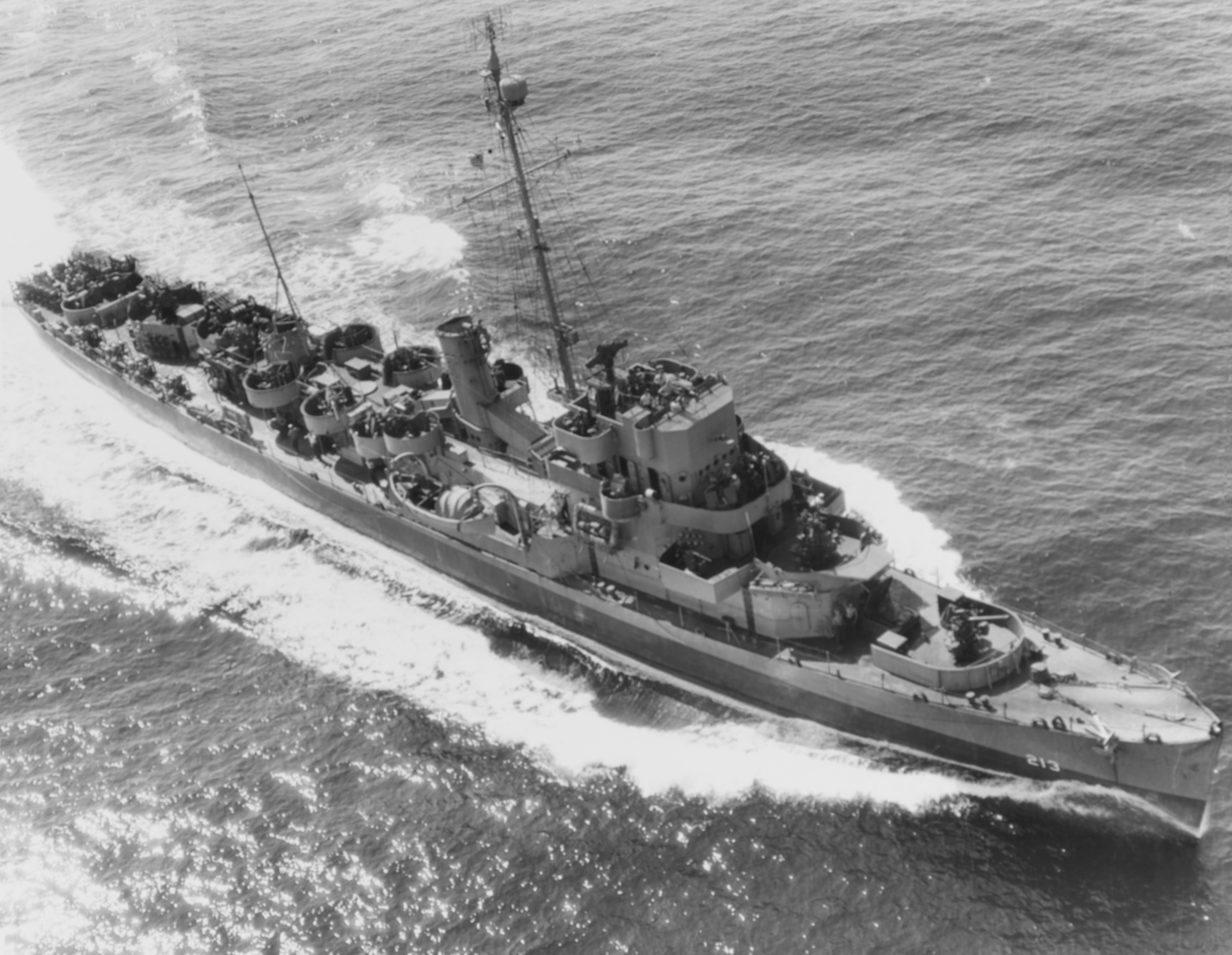

History

United States
- Name: USS William T. Powell
- Namesake: William T. Powell
- Ordered: 1942
- Builder: Charleston Navy Yard
- Laid down: 26 August 1943
- Launched: 27 November 1943
- Commissioned: 28 March 1944
- Decommissioned: 9 December 1949
- Recommissioned: 28 November 1950
- Decommissioned: 17 January 1958
- Reclassified: DER-213, 18 March 1949; DE-213, 1 December 1954
- Stricken: 1 November 1965
- Fate: Sold for scrap, 3 October 1966

General characteristics
- Class & type: Buckley-class destroyer escort
- Displacement: 1,400 long tons (1,422 t) light; 1,740 long tons (1,768 t) standard
- Length: 306 ft (93 m)
- Beam: 37 ft (11 m)
- Draft: 9 ft 6 in (2.90 m) standard; 11 ft 3 in (3.43 m) full load
- Propulsion: 2 × boilers; General Electric turbo-electric drive; 12,000 shp (8.9 MW); 2 × solid manganese-bronze 3,600 lb (1,600 kg) 3-bladed propellers, 8 ft 6 in (2.59 m) diameter, 7 ft 7 in (2.31 m) pitch; 2 × rudders; 359 tons fuel oil
- Speed: 23 knots (43 km/h; 26 mph)
- Range: 3,700 nmi (6,900 km) at 15 kn (28 km/h; 17 mph); 6,000 nmi (11,000 km) at 12 kn (22 km/h; 14 mph)
- Complement: 15 officers, 198 men
- Armament: 3 × 3"/50 caliber guns; 1 × quad 1.1"/75 caliber gun; 8 × single 20 mm guns; 1 × triple 21 inch (533 mm) torpedo tubes; 1 × Hedgehog anti-submarine mortar; 8 × K-gun depth charge projectors; 2 × depth charge tracks

USS William T. Powell (DE/DER-213), a Buckley-class destroyer escort of the United States Navy, was named in honor of Gunner's Mate William T. Powell (1918-1942), who was killed in action, aboard the heavy cruiser USS San Francisco off Guadalcanal on 12 November 1942.

William T. Powell was laid down on 26 August 1943 at the Charleston Navy Yard; launched on 27 November 1943; sponsored by Mrs. Elsie V. Powell, mother of Gunner's Mate Powell, and commissioned on 28 March 1944.

== Service history ==
=== World War II, 1944–1945 ===
==== Shakedown cruise ====
After fitting out, William T. Powell got underway from the Charleston Navy Yard on 18 April, flying the command pennant of Commander George F. Adams, USNR, Commander Escort Division 66, and bound for Bermuda.

At 15:41 on 20 April, the ship's search radar disclosed a contact. Seven minutes later, William T. Powell went to general quarters as lookouts noted a submarine running on the surface. The destroyer escort charged ahead at flank speed and challenged the submarine, only to be informed that the stranger was Pomfret (SS-391), en route from New London, Connecticut, to Key West, Florida. "All hands very disappointed when sub turned out to be friendly," noted Comdr. Adams in the destroyer escort's war diary as the ship continued on toward Bermuda.

Upon her arrival on the 21st, William T. Powell moored alongside Hamul (AD-20) and got underway three days later to commence her shakedown. In the ensuing weeks, the new destroyer escort's operations ran the gamut of activities for the ships of her type: exercises with submerged submarines (in her case, the old "R" boat, R-7 (SS-84); torpedo attack practices; fueling at sea; simulated depth charge and "hedgehog" attacks; shore bombardments, and the inevitable gunnery drills. She operated out of Great Sound, Bermuda, and normally returned to anchor each evening upon the completion of the day's slate of activities.

==== Escort duty ====
Her shakedown completed shortly after the middle of May, William T. Powell sailed for Charleston on the 18th. She met SS Willis A. Slater off the sea buoy to Great Sound that day and escorted the merchantman on her northward voyage, patrolling 2,000 yards ahead. Leaving Willis A. Slater off Charleston, William T. Powell put into port on the 23rd and, from 24 May to 6 June 1944, underwent post-shakedown availability. During the overhaul, the ship received four 40-millimeter Bofors guns, replacing the bank of torpedo tubes, to give the ship a more potent anti-aircraft battery.

Underway for the Panama Canal Zone on 9 June, William T. Powell test-fired her new 40-millimeter battery en route and reached Cristobal, Canal Zone, at 11:47 on 11 June. She transited the canal two days later and got underway again at 06:27 on the 14th for exercises at sea near Taboga Island. She practiced repelling attacks by motor torpedo boats.

William T. Powell subsequently retransmitted the canal, eastbound on 15 June, and moored at Cristobal at 18:18 that day. She joined the escort carrier Prince William (CVE-31) on the 17th and escorted the escort carrier as she headed, via Port Everglades, Florida, for Hampton Roads, Virginia.

Released from that escort duty on the 24th, William T. Powell then operated at Norfolk, Virginia from 29 June to 9 July as a school ship for destroyer escort crew trainees before she sortied from Hampton Roads on 10 July in the screen of Convoy UGS-48.

==== Convoy UGS-48 ====
At 00:29 on 1 August 1944, William T. Powell received a TBS message from the task force commander, Captain C. M. E. Hoffman, in Moffett (DD-362), to man battle stations in anticipation of an enemy air attack. The destroyer escort complied and soon, together with the other escorts of sector 3, began making funnel smoke

Radar picked up the enemy attackers at 90 miles away; William T. Powell and her sisters, meanwhile, continued steaming back and forth at the rear of the convoy, making smoke. The convoy received an additional alert from radio Algiers at 00:37 and, 13 minutes later, detected many friendly and enemy planes. The escorts now began making chemical smoke from the CS canisters on the fantail of each ship; with visibility near zero, the ships commenced conning by radar.

HMS Delhi, a British anti-aircraft cruiser, commenced the action at 00:58, firing by radar control. At 01:05, lookouts in William T. Powell spotted flares close aboard on the port side of the convoy; but the gunners were cautioned not to fire. Ten minutes later, however, with enemy planes within range, the convoy opened up; mount 21 in William T. Powell glimpsed an enemy bomber through the eerie murk and fired a four-round burst; the plane, obscured in smoke and clouds, soon disappeared. The firing lasted only a minute; William T. Powell ceased fire at 01:16, feeling detonations from time to time-believed to be either bombs or torpedoes exploding at the end of their runs.

By 01:53, the quartermaster on watch in William T. Powell could write: "Things cool off a bit and Condition Easy-One is set." At 02:30, the convoy received a white alert (all clear), and the escorts ceased making smoke and took their normal screening stations. Seven minutes later, the destroyer escort secured from general quarters. The defense of UGS-48 was a successful one; the enemy did not claim any of the ships. As Lt. Davenport, the commanding officer of William T. Powell, wrote in his subsequent report of the action: "The value of smoke as a protection against Night Air Attack was proved. Visibility was absolutely zero, and flares were useless to the attacking planes."

==== Convoy escort and submarine hunter ====
After seeing all ships of UGS-48 safely to their Mediterranean destination, William T. Powell served with Task Force 62 as it escorted the homeward-bound group, GUS-48, back to the United States before heading north for training in the Casco Bay area. During the night of 14 and 15 September, while en route to Casco Bay, William T. Powell rode out a hurricane with no damage.

The destroyer escort shepherded Convoys UGS-55 and GUS-55 to their respective Mediterranean and East Coast destinations in September and October, before she became a unit of Task Unit 27.1.2 based at NS Argentia, Newfoundland. She operated out of Argentia as part of that anti-submarine, hunter-killer group from 28 November to 24 December 1944 before shifting to Casco Bay and operating from that base from Christmas Eve to New Year's Day.

After TU 27.1.2 was redesignated TG 22.9, William T. Powell resumed operations from Argentia on 4 January 1945 and continued them through the end of the month. Following that stint of hunter-killer duty, the destroyer escort exercised with American submarines out of New London, Connecticut, for almost a month, 4 February to 2 March 1945, and trained in Casco Bay from 18 to 21 March.

After the completion of that training period, William T. Powell proceeded with TG 22.9, via the Azores, to Liverpool, England. Upon arrival, TG 22.9 was redesignated and reconstituted as TG 120.1 on 4 April; William T. Powell operated as flagship for that unit's senior officer, Comdr. Vernon A. Isaacs, USNR.

TG 120.1, later redesignated Escort Group 32, subsequently performed anti-submarine hunter-killer group and support unit duties for convoys in the western approaches to the United Kingdom. During the closing weeks of the European war, William T. Powell patrolled shallow water approaches, sank floating and drifting mines, and supported the escorts for 12 convoys in submarine-infested waters. She based on Derry, Northern Ireland, from 5 April to 23 May, through the cessation of hostilities with Germany and, after that enemy's capitulation, helped to accept the surrender of German U-boats.

Released from the 12th Fleet and the Western Approaches Command on 24 May 1945, the destroyer escort soon sailed for home, entering the Brown Shipbuilding Company, Inc., yard in Houston, Texas, on 15 June for conversion to a radar picket ship. However, in mid-August while she was in the yard for alterations, Japan capitulated.

=== Post-war activities, 1945–1946 ===
She departed her conversion yard on 22 October 1945 and soon proceeded to Guantanamo Bay, Cuba, for refresher training. Following post-shakedown availability, William T Powell trained in Casco Bay into late January 1946 and underwent a logistics period at Boston. She then sailed to Miami, Florida, where she joined the presidential yacht, Williamsburg, from 8 to 13 February before sailing for Norfolk. She later pushed on for Quonset Point, Rhode Island, on 31 March and, in April, plane-guarded for the escort carrier Salerno Bay (CVE-110), in company with Reuben James (DE-153), in Narragansett Bay and off Norfolk and participated in fleet exercises at Guantanamo Bay and Culebra in May.

Departing the latter on 20 May, William T. Powell sailed for New York in company with the carrier Mindoro (CVE-120) and Reuben James. The destroyer escort subsequently returned to the Norfolk and Casco Bay operating areas in early June and July before visiting Bar Harbor, Maine, for 4th of July celebrations. Soon thereafter, she resumed training evolutions in Casco Bay before heading south on 19 July for Pensacola, Florida. She served there as temporary relief for the destroyer William R. Rush (DD-714) and plane-guarded for Ranger (CV-4) while that venerable carrier was serving as a training vessel.

William T. Powell operated with one of her former World War II cohorts, Spangenberg (DE-223), in Casco Bay later that summer and off New London served as a target vessel for submarines from 13 to 30 September. She arrived at Newport, Rhode Island, on 30 September, moored alongside Yellowstone (AD-27) for a three-week tender availability, and subsequently departed Newport on 22 October, bound for Casco Bay where she arrived the same day. She conducted Navy Day observances there on the 27th before she transited the Cape Cod Canal and arrived at New London on 12 December. She spent the remainder of the year operating on training evolutions with submarines.

=== 1947–1958 ===
For the next 11 years, William T. Powell operated off the eastern seaboard of the United States ranging from Casco Bay to Cape Henry to Key West and into the West Indies and Guantanamo Bay. Her ports of call included Newport; Norfolk; Boston; New York City; Port-au-Prince, Haiti; Culebra and San Juan, Puerto Rico; Havana and Santiago, Cuba; Saint Thomas, U.S. Virgin Islands; and Nassau, Bahamas.

During that period, the ship underwent several changes of status and two reclassifications. On 5 November 1948, she was assigned to the 4th Naval District and homeported at the Philadelphia Naval Shipyard to serve as a Naval Reserve Training ship. On 18 March 1949, the warship was reclassified DER-213. Decommissioned on 9 December 1949, the vessel was reactivated on 28 November 1950 and resumed the role of an NRT ship. She was reclassified DE-213 on 1 December 1954 and continued training duty until September 1957. On 31 March 1955 the S.S. Mormacspruce, a cargo vessel and William T. Powell collided at approximately 2015 hrs. The Mormacspruce had bow damage and the Powell suffered severe hull damage to her aft starboard side. No one was killed, but 2 sailors on the Powell were injured. William T. Powell was placed out of commission, in reserve, at Philadelphia on 17 January 1958.

=== Final disposal ===
Struck from the Navy List on 1 November 1965 William T. Powell was sold on 3 October 1966 to the North American Smelting Company, Wilmington, Delaware, and was scrapped. Her name plate is on display at the Freedom Park.

== Awards ==
Although she participated in the defense of Convoy UGS-48 on 1 August 1944, and was in proximity to enemy forces, William T. Powell inexplicably received no battle star for that action.
