= ARA Santiago del Estero =

Five ships of the Argentine Navy have been named ARA Santiago del Estero after the Santiago del Estero Province of Argentina:

- ARA Santiago del Estero (1911) a San Luis-class destroyer launched in 1911 but sold to Greece before acceptance.
- ARA Santiago del Estero (1932), built in Italy and commissioned in 1933, served until 1960
- ARA Santiago del Estero (S-12), formerly USS Lamprey, commissioned in 1960 and served until 1971
- ARA Santiago del Estero (S-22), formerly USS Chivo, commissioned in 1971 and served until 1981
- ARA Santiago del Estero (S-44), is a TR-1700-class submarine that was never completed due to the Argentine economic crisis of the 1980s
