= USS LSM-45 =

1944 LSM-1-class landing ship medium

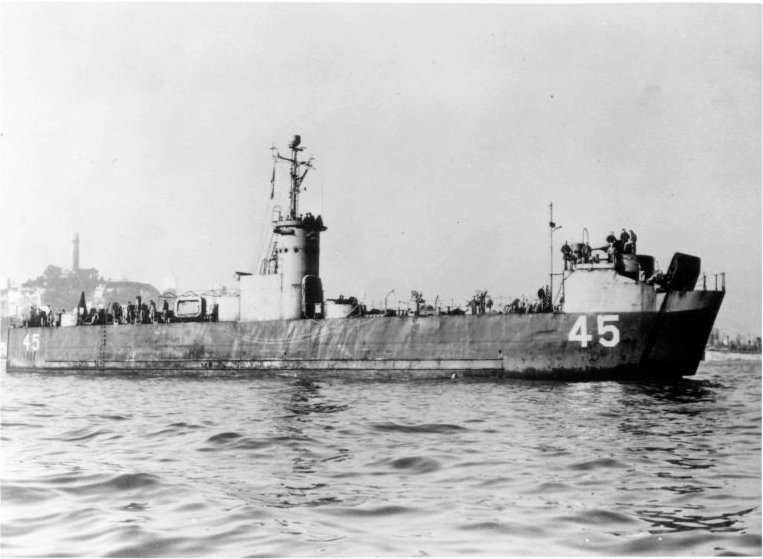
- LSM-45 in San Francisco Bay, ca. 1945–46

History

United States
- Name: USS LSM-45
- Builder: Brown Shipyard Co., Houston, Texas
- Laid down: 6 June 1944
- Launched: 30 June 1944
- Commissioned: 31 July 1944
- Decommissioned: 27 March 1947
- Fate: Transferred to Greece, 3 November 1958

Greece
- Name: Ypoploiarchos Grigoropoulos
- Acquired: 3 November 1958
- Identification: L161
- Fate: Returned to United States as museum ship, 1998; Sold to be converted into a barge, then scrapped

General characteristics
- Class & type: LSM-1-class Landing Ship Medium
- Displacement: 520 long tons (528 t) empty; 1,095 long tons (1,113 t) full load
- Length: 203 ft 6 in (62.03 m)
- Beam: 34 ft 6 in (10.52 m)
- Draft: Landing : 3 ft 6 in (1.07 m) forward; 7 ft 8 in (2.34 m) aft; Full load : 6 ft 4 in (1.93 m) forward; 8 ft 3 in (2.51 m) aft
- Propulsion: 2 Fairbanks-Morse diesel engines, 2,800 shp (2,088 kW), direct drive, 2 screws
- Speed: 13.2 knots (24.4 km/h; 15.2 mph)
- Range: 4,900 nmi (9,100 km) at 12 kn (22 km/h; 14 mph)
- Capacity: 5 × medium tanks or; 3 × heavy tanks or; 6 × LVTs or; 9 × DUKWs
- Troops: 2 officers, 46 enlisted
- Complement: 5 officers, 54 enlisted
- Armament: 1 × single 40 mm AA gun; 4 × single 20 mm AA guns

USS LSM-45 was a LSM-1-class medium landing ship built for the United States Navy during World War II. The ship also served as Ypoploiarchos Grigoropoulos (L161) in the Hellenic Navy from 1958 to 1993. She was the last known surviving LSM in its original configuration. Her last location before scrapping was Marine Corps Base Camp Lejeune in North Carolina. LSM-45 was donated to the Museum of the Marine by the now defunct Amphibious Ship Museum under the understanding that it would be put on display at the museum, and was towed to North Carolina in 2004 from Omaha, Nebraska. The museum decided in 2007 that the ship would not be a part of the museum and tried looking for another home for the ship. In 2009, there were reports that the Museum was considering scrapping or sinking the ship as an artificial reef, and she was scrapped sometime between 2010 and 2014.

== Career ==
USS LSM-45 was laid down on 6 June 1944 at Brown Shipyard Co. in Houston, Texas, and was launched on 30 June 1944. She was commissioned on 31 July 1944.

During World War II LSM-45 was assigned to the Pacific Theater and saw service in the Philippines. She was decommissioned on 27 March 1947 at Green Cove Springs, Florida, and laid up in the Atlantic Reserve Fleet, Florida Group, Green Cove Springs.

On 3 November 1958, the ship was transferred to Greece, and served in the Hellenic Navy under the name Ypoploiarchos Grigoropoulos (L-161).

== AMA ownership ==
In early 1998, the Amphibious Museum of the Americas (AMA) found the former LSM-45 in Greece, half sunk. The AMA raised and restored the ship and had it towed back to the United States. A press release stated, "We have found USS LSM-45 in the Grecian Isles and she is being returned to the United States to be placed in the National Naval Museum at Freedom Park, Omaha, Nebraska, right on the Missouri River." Getting LSM-45 ready for towing to New Orleans took a month in the Greek naval base's repair yard.

In August 1998, the ship came under full control of the USS LSM-LSMR Association, made up of former shipmates who served on LSMs and similar ships from 1944 to 1970.

Intermarine of New Orleans, Louisiana, volunteered its services to the Landing Ship, Medium (LSM) Association of America and committed to deliver the ship over the 7,000-nautical-mile (13,000 km) distance from Greece to Omaha, Nebraska.

The LSM departed Hellenic Naval Base, Skaramagas, Greece, on 9 September 1998 under tow of the chartered Russian tug, Ost. After a stop at Tenerife, in the Canary Islands for fuel, the tug made way across the Atlantic Ocean heading directly west on course 270° at a speed of 7.2 knots (13.3 km/h; 8.3 mph). Rounding the Florida Keys, the Ost and her tow then headed up through the Gulf and arrived at the Port of New Orleans on 20 October.

Intermarine assumed the responsibility as agents for the LSM Association and Freedom Park, managing all registration and berthing efforts upon the LSM's port of entry arrival. Additional port services were arranged with gracious vendors and many volunteers who donated their services. The timing of the tow from New Orleans to the nation's heartland at Omaha, Nebraska, was the next big hurdle primarily because the Missouri River was closing to navigation traffic around mid-November. Barge and tow operators are usually busy getting their equipment out of the rivers before the winter freeze.

Towing from New Orleans, up the Mississippi River to St. Louis, was made possible by American Commercial Barge Lines. Blaske Marine then provided the AMA a dedicated towboat, the M/V Omaha, Captained by William Beacom, to push LSM-45 up the Missouri from St. Louis to a permanent riverfront berth at Freedom Park, arriving on Monday, 23 November 1998.

While in Omaha, restoration work was done by volunteers including a fresh coat of paint, unstepping the mast for storage, and work on all decks. The bulkheads below deck were lined with rows of walnut plaques with the names of those hundreds of individuals that had given of their time and money to restore and save the LSM. There is evidence on every deck, in every compartment, from the galley to the engine room that many hours of restoration had taken place by dedicated workers.

== Donation to Museum of the Marine ==
The Amphibious Ship Museum, a group of former military members who served on LSMs during World War II and the Korean War, were unhappy with the maintenance and upkeep of the LSM-45 at Freedom Park and began looking for a new home for the ship. Museum representatives contacted Headquarters Marine Corps' historical branch, which put them in touch with the Marine Corps Museum of the Carolinas. The Amphibious Ship Museum agreed to turn over rights to the ship and its artifacts to the Marine Corps Museum of the Carolinas once the ship anchored at Mile Hammock Bay, near Camp Lejeune, North Carolina.

On 11 December 2003 the State Department granted approval for the moving of the LSM-45. The ship was towed to the Museum of the Marine in Jacksonville, North Carolina, in April 2004. Once docked behind the museum, it was to be opened to the public and the ship's deck was to be filled with equipment used during World War II.

After nearly three years, the Museum of the Marine announced it was pulling anchor on the donated World War II ship and looking for someone who could better afford its preservation.

Initially, the museum planned to incorporate the 500-ton vessel into a site plan that, at the time, focused on waterfront property on the New River next to Jacksonville's proposed civic center. Location prospects fizzled, though, along with the civic center plans.

Now ready to break ground sans water, the Museum of the Marine rethought its ability to keep the ship afloat. The museum's announcement to break ties with the ship came shortly after members of the USS LSM/LSMR Association – an organization closely tied to the ship's donors – began questioning the fate of the ship after learning of the museum's plans to build in the landlocked Lejeune Memorial Gardens.

By May 2003, the Museum of the Marine has identified several organizations as a suitable home for the vessel and hoped to share transportation costs with the benefactor.

In photos taken in February 2009, the ship appears to have significantly deteriorated since being handed over to the Museum of the Marine, and will again need new paint.

== Reports of plans to scrap ==
By late 2008 reports had begun to surface that the Museum of the Marine had not found a suitable home for the ship, and that due to a request by the Coast Guard for the return of the pier where it was moored, were considering scrapping the ship, or sinking it as an artificial reef. The ship was also closed to visitors, although members of the restored USS LST-325 were able to visit and tour the ship in February 2009 by making contact with the museum. In May, 2009, a working group from USS Slater removed parts and material for use in the restoration of their ship (in Albany, New York). In February 2010, crewmembers from LST -325 also removed parts. The Museum of the Marine plans to remove the 40 mm mount and the conning tower for possible display, with LSM-45 then being used as a barge by a private owner.

In October 2010, the last surviving crewmember of LSM-45 from World War II died. At that time it was also reported that LSM-45 had been sold to Justice Marine, Sneads Ferry, North Carolina to be altered into a barge. However, in February 2014 it was reported that it was not suitable for use as a barge so it was scrapped instead.

== Status as last known survivor ==
Up to 2010, USS LSM-45 was one of three known survivors, along with LSM-333 and LSM-469, which were owned by the Royal Thai Navy.

On 1 February 2003, LSM-469 was sunk as an artificial reef off the coast of Pattaya, Thailand.

On 17 September 2006 the Royal Thai Navy sank LSM-333 off the coast of Thailand at Pattaya, leaving LSM-45 as the last known survivor in original Naval configuration. Other LSMs have been converted to commercial use.

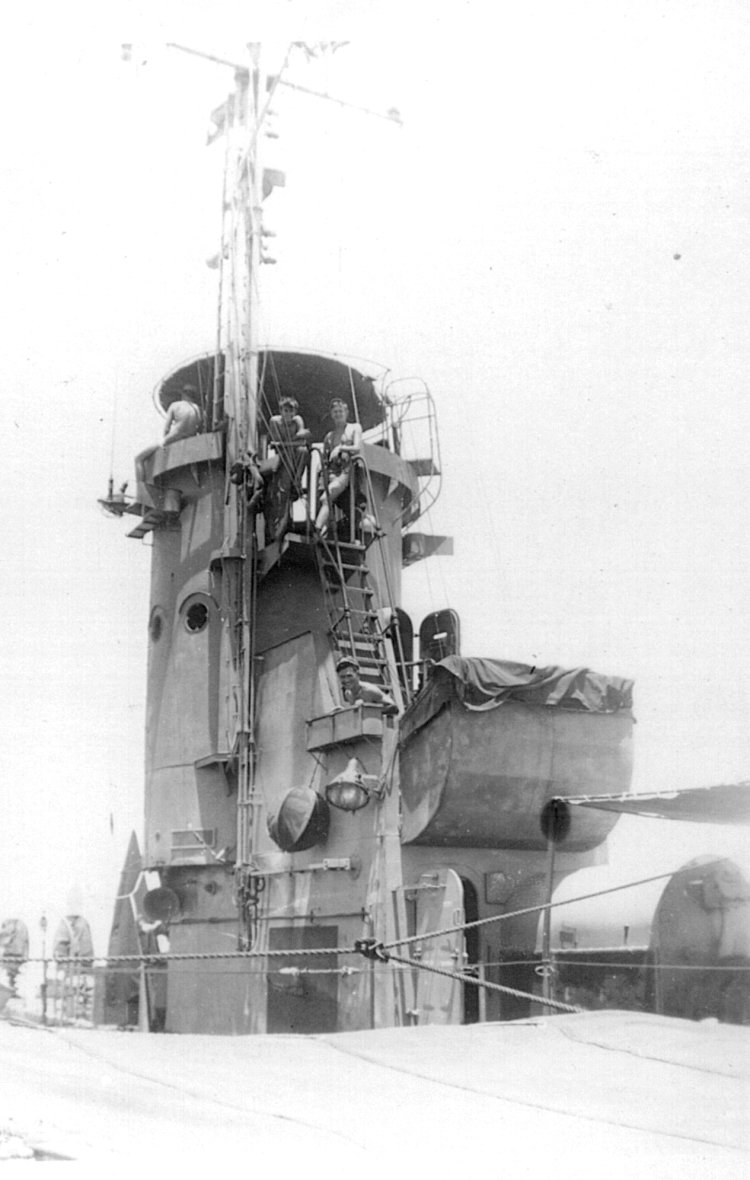
LSM-45 in the Philippines, date unknown

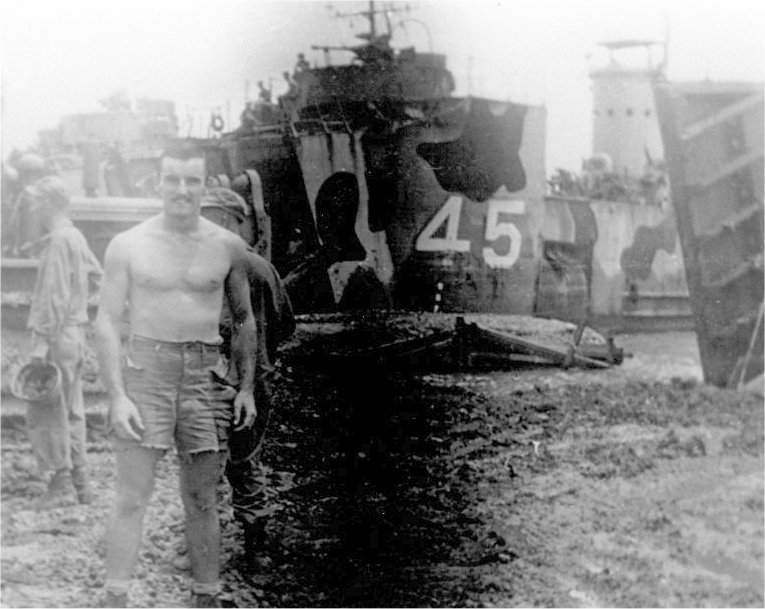
LSM-45 beached at Cebu, c. 1945

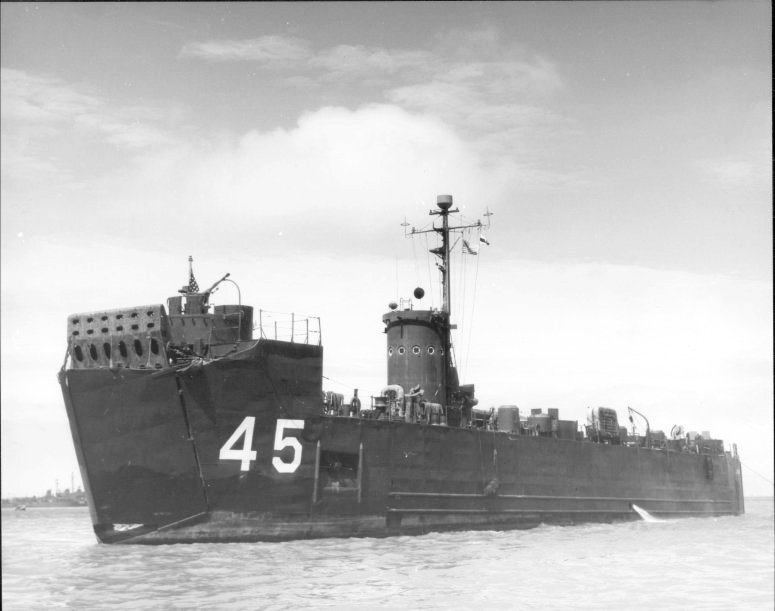
LSM-45, c. 1946

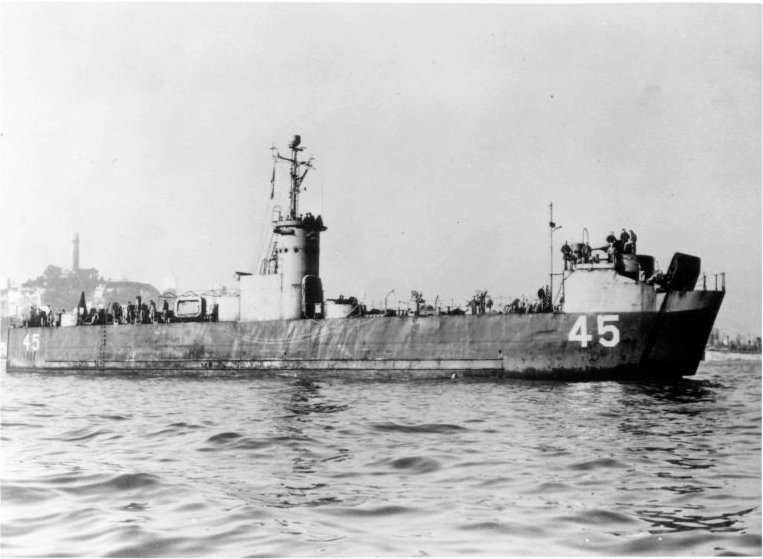
LSM-45 in San Francisco Bay, 1945 or 1946

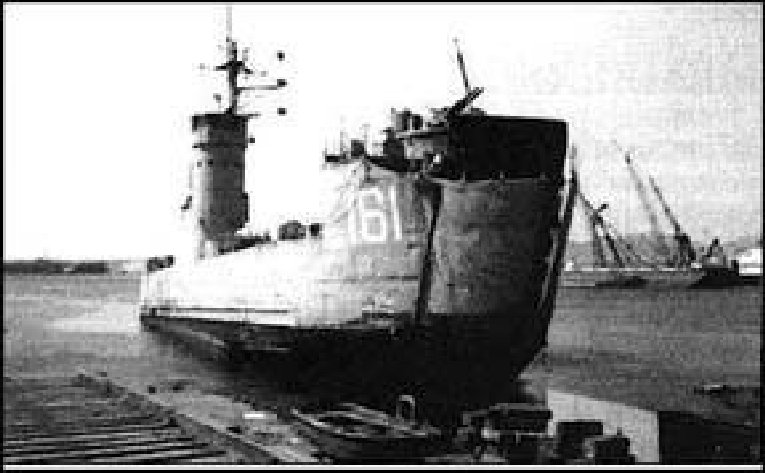
LSM-45 in the Greek Navy, renamed Ypoploiarchos Grigoropoulos (L-161), undergoes pre-voyage outfitting in the Hellenic Naval Base at Skaramangas, Greece
