= USS Lamprey =

Submarine of the United States

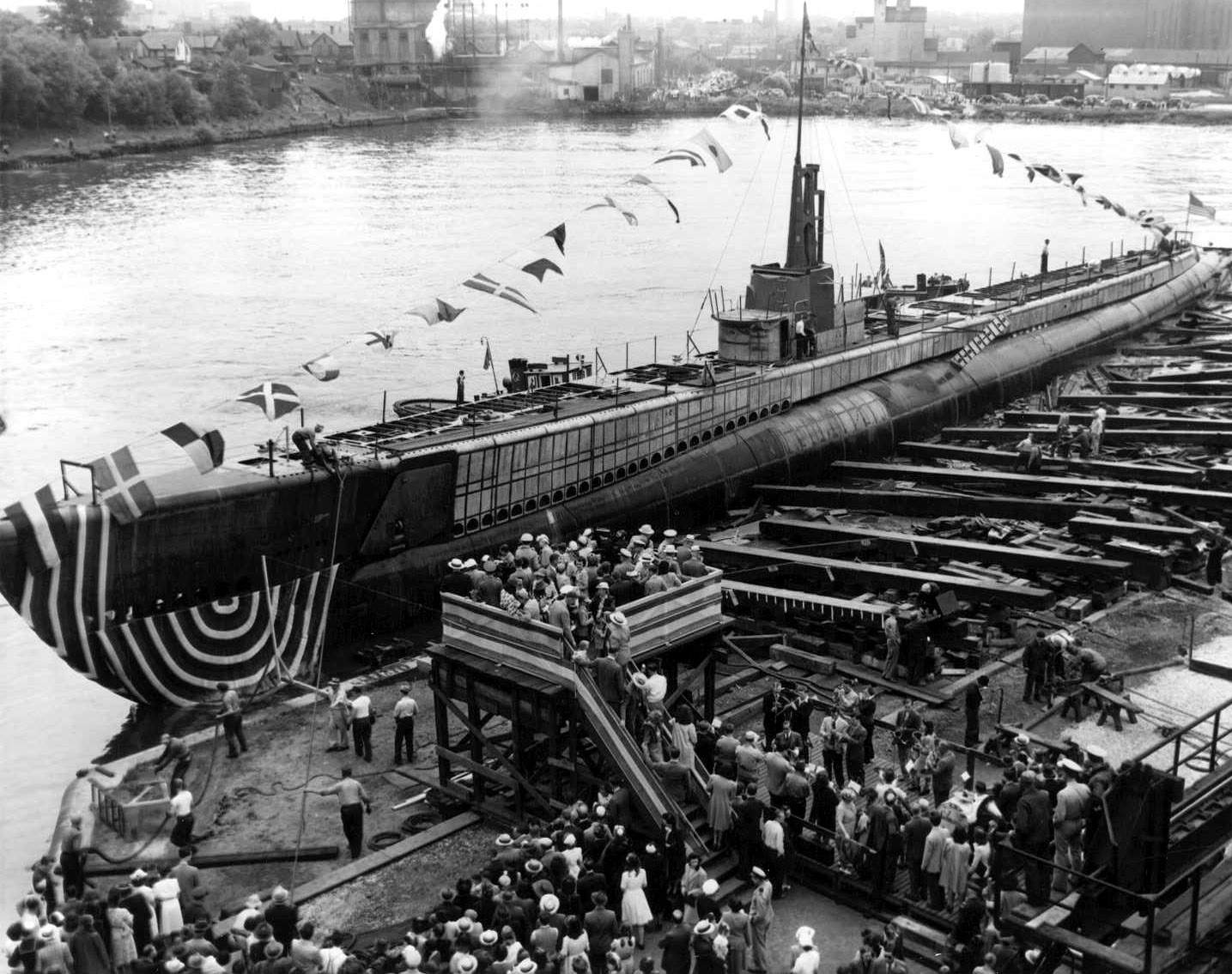
- Lamprey, immediately after launching.

History

United States
- Name: USS Lamprey (SS-372)
- Builder: Manitowoc Shipbuilding Company, Manitowoc, Wisconsin
- Laid down: 22 February 1944
- Launched: 18 June 1944
- Commissioned: 17 November 1944
- Decommissioned: 3 June 1946
- Recommissioned: 1960
- Decommissioned: 21 August 1960
- Stricken: 1 September 1971
- Fate: Transferred to Argentina, 21 August 1960
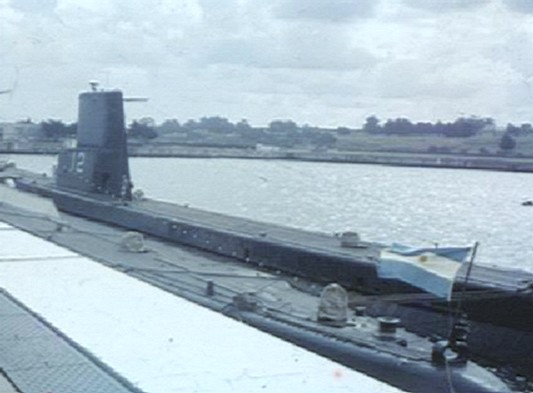
- ARA Santiago del Estero (S-12), ex-Lamprey (SS-372) at anchor at Mar del Plata naval base

Argentina
- Name: ARA Santiago del Estero (S-12)
- Acquired: 21 July 1960
- Commissioned: 3 November 1960
- Decommissioned: 1971
- Fate: Broken up 1974 for use as spare parts

General characteristics
- Class & type: Balao class diesel-electric submarine
- Displacement: 1,526 tons (1,550 t) surfaced; 2,424 tons (2,463 t) submerged
- Length: 311 ft 9 in (95.02 m)
- Beam: 27 ft 3 in (8.31 m)
- Draft: 16 ft 10 in (5.13 m) maximum
- Propulsion: 4 × General Motors Model 16-278A V16 diesel engines driving electrical generators; 2 × 126-cell Sargo batteries; 4 × high-speed General Electric electric motors with reduction gears; 2 × propellers; 5,400 shp (4.0 MW) surfaced; 2,740 shp (2.0 MW) submerged
- Speed: 20.25 knots (38 km/h) surfaced; 8.75 knots (16 km/h) submerged
- Range: 11,000 nautical miles (20,000 km) surfaced at 10 knots (19 km/h)
- Endurance: 48 hours at 2 knots (3.7 km/h) submerged; 75 days on patrol
- Test depth: 400 ft (120 m)
- Complement: 10 officers, 70–71 enlisted
- Armament: 10 × 21-inch (533 mm) torpedo tubes; 6 forward, 4 aft; 24 torpedoes; 1 × 5-inch (127 mm) / 25 caliber deck gun; Bofors 40 mm and Oerlikon 20 mm cannon

USS Lamprey (SS-372), a Balao-class submarine, was a ship of the United States Navy named for the lamprey, any of certain eel-like aquatic vertebrates.

== USS Lamprey (SS-372) ==
Lamprey (SS-372) was laid down 22 February 1944 by the Manitowoc Shipbuilding Company, Manitowoc, Wisconsin; launched 18 June 1944, sponsored by Mrs. W. T. Nelson; and commissioned 17 November 1944.

After trials, tests, and training in Lake Michigan, the new submarine entered a floating drydock on 7 December at Lockport, Illinois; was floated down the Mississippi River; and arrived at New Orleans on 13 December. Four days later she departed New Orleans for the Pacific.

Lamprey sailed from Pearl Harbor 17 February 1945 for the coast of Luzon and her first war patrol. She steamed on life guard duty off Formosa and Hong Kong until 29 March; transited the Singapore Straits 8 April; and the next day steamed through the Karimata Straits into the Java Sea. She sighted no worthwhile targets, however, because most of Japan's merchant marine and naval fleet had been destroyed. The submarine headed for a refit at Fremantle, Australia, arriving 22 April 1945.

Under a new commanding officer, Lt. Comdr. Lucien B. McDonald, Lamprey cleared Fremantle 21 May and entered the Java Sea bound for her patrol area in the Siam Gulf. On 28 May Lamprey and USS Blueback closed for a coordinated gun attack which damaged and set afire a 600-ton escort ship. Lamprey set course for Subic Bay where she arrived 29 June.

The submarine returned to sea 26 July for her third war patrol and spent most of her time searching for targets along the Gulf of Siam. She entered the Singapore area 8 August to patrol west of Pengiboe Island where she sank a small craft with gunfire. She was relieved on station by British submarine HMS Spearhead the same day and headed for Borneo. On 12 August her guns destroyed a cargo-carrying lugger from Surabaya. The submarine was closing in on a two-masted schooner 15 August when she received word to cease hostilities.

Lamprey departed Subic Bay 31 August and moored in San Francisco, 22 September. She entered Mare Island Naval Shipyard, decommissioned 3 June 1946, and was laid up in the Pacific Reserve Fleet.

Lamprey received four battle stars for World War II service.

== ARA Santiago del Estero (S-12) ==
On 21 July 1960 she was transferred on loan to the Government of Argentina and was commissioned in the Argentine Navy as ARA Santiago del Estero (S-12). Along with ARA Santa Fe (former USS Macabi), she was used mainly for training. The conning towers of both submarines were later locally upgraded to improve hydrodynamics. Some years ago, Argentinian officials disclosed that a group of tactical divers had carried out an incursion on the Falkland Islands on board the Santiago del Estero in October 1966.

The submarine was returned to US Navy custody, 1 September 1971, to be struck from the Naval Vessel Register and sold outright to the Argentine Navy, which therefore employed them only for training purposes. Both submarines were broken up in 1974 for use as spare parts.

== See also ==
- ARA Santiago del Estero for other Argentine ships named after Santiago del Estero Province
