= Chester Nimitz Jr. =

United States Navy admiral (1915–2002)

Chester William Nimitz Jr.
- Born: February 17, 1915; Brooklyn, New York, U.S.
- Died: January 2, 2002 (aged 86); Needham, Massachusetts, U.S.
- Burial place: Pleasant Hill Cemetery; Wellfleet, Massachusetts
- Relatives: Fleet Admiral Chester W. Nimitz (father)
- Military career
- Allegiance: United States
- Branch: United States Navy
- Service years: 1936–1957
- Rank: Rear Admiral
- Commands: Submarine Squadron 6 USS Sarda (SS-488); USS Haddo (SS-255) USS Orion (AS-18)
- Conflicts: World War II; Korean War
- Awards: Navy Cross; Silver Star (3); Bronze Star Medal
- Other work: Businessman

Chester William "Chet" Nimitz Jr. (February 17, 1915 – January 2, 2002) was an American submarine commander in the United States Navy during World War II and the Korean War, and a businessman. He was awarded the Navy Cross and three Silver Stars for valor in battle. He was the son of U.S. Navy Fleet Admiral Chester W. Nimitz.

== Early life ==
Nimitz was born to Chester William Nimitz Sr. and Catherine Vance (née Freeman) Nimitz at the Brooklyn Navy Yard Hospital in Brooklyn, New York, while the couple, with their daughter Catherine Vance "Kate" (born the year before), lived at 415 Washington Avenue, Brooklyn, and Nimitz Sr. was working on the USS Maumee at the Brooklyn Navy Yard.

Nimitz attended the United States Naval Academy at Annapolis, Maryland, graduating with the class of 1936. Before he attended the Naval Academy, he attended Tabor Academy for a year and played the violin.

Nimitz married Joan Leona Labern at the Mare Island Naval Shipyard on 18 June 1938. She was born in León, Nicaragua in 1912 to British parents, William Oscar Stonewall and Frances Mary (née Wells) Labern. With her parents she returned to England at the outbreak of World War I in 1914, and was raised in England. Joan came to the United States in 1938 to study dentistry at the University of California Dental School in San Francisco, and met Chester at a cocktail party at Mare Island. She made news in 1944 when she failed her test to become a United States citizen; two days later she did become an American citizen.

The couple had three daughters, Frances Mary, Elizabeth Joan, and Sarah Catherine.

== Naval career ==
=== Commands ===
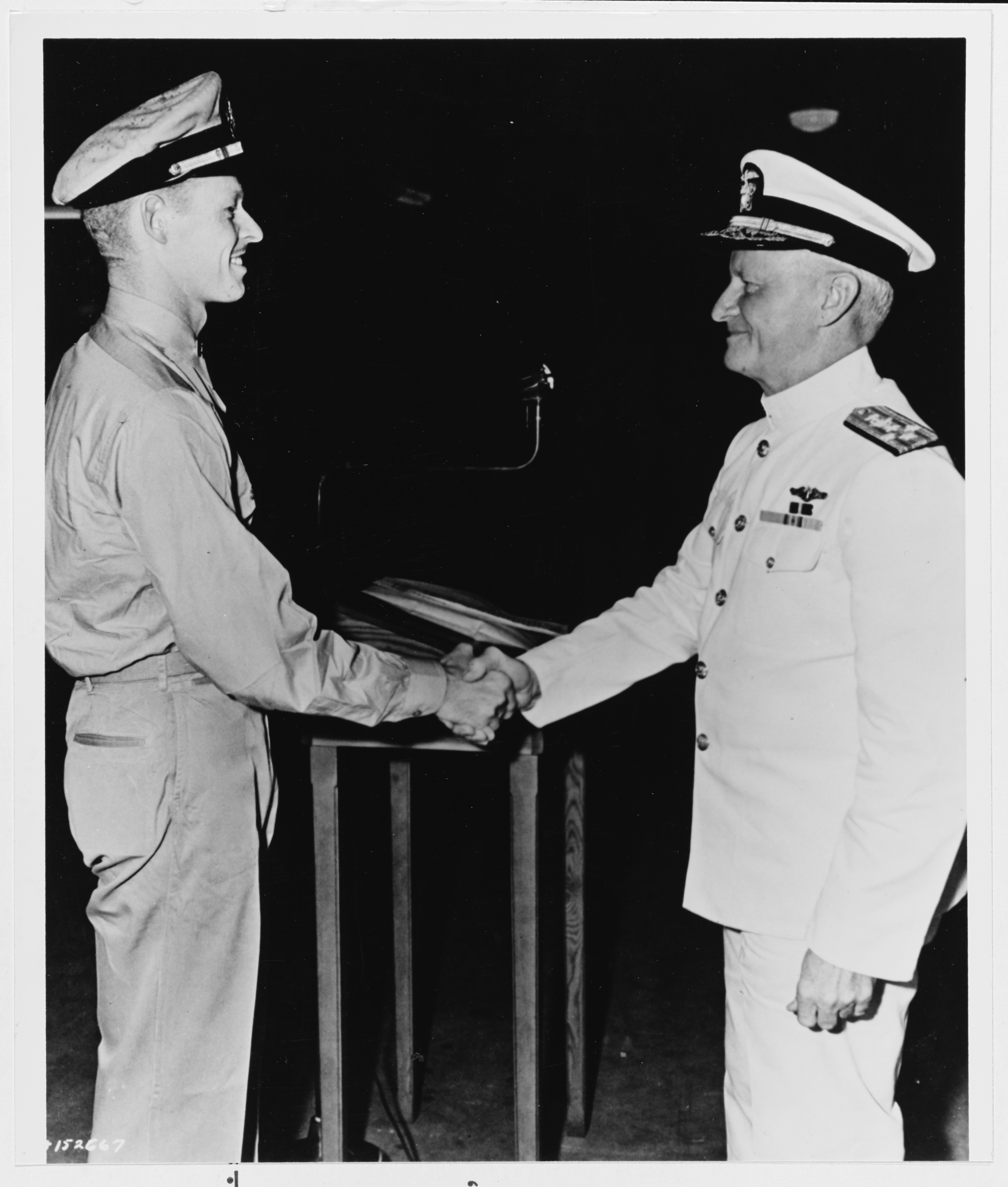
Nimitz congratulated by his father after receiving the Silver Star

- Served aboard the heavy cruiser USS Indianapolis (CA-35) from July 1936 to December 1938
- Served aboard the submarine USS Sturgeon (SS-187) during the Philippines campaign (1941–1942) from June 1939 to 1943
- Served aboard USS Bluefish (SS-222) as Executive Officer from May 24, 1943 to February 17, 1944
- Commanded the U.S. Navy submarine USS Haddo from February 17, 1944 until October 10, 1944 and inflicted 14,756 tons of shipping losses upon the Imperial Japanese Navy during the period of August 22, 1944 – September 21, 1944
- Commanded the U.S. Navy submarine USS Sarda (SS-488) from April 19, 1945 to June 1948
- Commanded USS O'Brien (DD-725) from October 5, 1950 to December 1951
- Commanded Submarine Division 32 based in Norfolk, Virginia
- Served on the staff on Commander in Chief, U.S. Naval Forces, Eastern Atlantic and Mediterranean from 1953 to 1956
- Commanded the submarine tender USS Orion (AS-18) from August 11, 1956, to July 25, 1957

== Later life ==
Chester Nimitz Jr. retired from the navy as rear admiral in 1957. He joined Texas Instruments, and spent four years there. He later joined Perkin-Elmer Corporation, a manufacturer of scientific instruments based in Norwalk, Connecticut. He became president, chief executive officer (CEO) and a director in 1965, and was elected chairman of the board in 1969, serving until retirement in 1980.

Nimitz was an honorary trustee and honorary member of the corporation of the Woods Hole Oceanographic Institution.

=== Death ===
The health of Nimitz and his wife, Joan, deteriorated in their later years. Joan was blind, and Nimitz had lost 30 pounds (14 kg) due to a prolonged stomach disorder. He was also suffering from congestive heart failure. On January 2, 2002, Chester Nimitz Jr. committed voluntary suicide with his wife Joan by ingesting a quantity of sleeping pills in their home at a retirement residence in Needham, Massachusetts. He left a note stating:

Our decision was made over a considerable period of time and was not carried out in acute desperation. Nor is it the expression of a mental illness. We have consciously, rationally, deliberately and of our own free will taken measures to end our lives today because of the physical limitations on our quality of life placed upon us by age, failing vision, osteoporosis, back and painful orthopedic problems.

== Awards and decorations ==
Navy Cross
Silver Star with two gold award stars
Bronze Star Medal
Navy Unit Commendation – USS Haddo (7th war patrol)

=== Navy Cross Citation ===

Commander 7th Fleet: Serial 03563 (December 24, 1944)

The President of the United States of America takes pleasure in presenting the Navy Cross to Lieutenant Commander Chester William Nimitz, Jr. (NSN: 0-77207), United States Navy, for extraordinary heroism in the line of his profession as Commanding Officer of the U.S.S. HADDO (SS-255), on the SEVENTH War Patrol of that submarine during the period 8 August 1944 to 3 October 1944, in enemy controlled waters of the South China Sea. In waters adjacent to the Philippine Islands of Luzon and Mindoro he skillfully directed his vessel in a series of successful torpedo attacks and a gun attack on Japanese men-of-war and escorted merchant shipping. With outstanding aggressiveness and determination to inflict the maximum damage on enemy forces he engaged and sank two fleet-type Japanese Destroyers and another large Armed Escort Vessel, and seriously damaged a third Destroyer. In further attacks on heavily escorted convoys he sank two cargo vessels and a transport, thereby accounting for a total of 17,100 tons of shipping sunk and 1,300 tons damaged on this patrol. He displayed sound tactical judgment in his decisions on all attacks and maneuvered his ship expertly to avoid all damage from the counterattacks of enemy anti-submarine vessels and airplanes. On one occasion he cooperated with our aircraft during a bombing raid on enemy bases and gallantly rescued a naval aviator from the sea. His actions and conduct throughout were an inspiration to his officers and crew and fully in keeping with the highest traditions of the United States Naval Service.

=== Silver Star citation (first award) ===
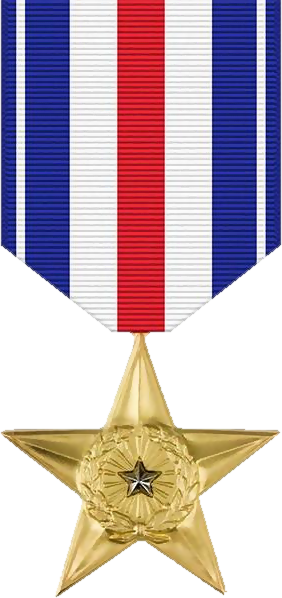

Commander Southwest Pacific: Serial 00763 (December 17, 1942)

The President of the United States of America takes pleasure in presenting the Silver Star to Lieutenant Chester William Nimitz, Jr. (NSN: 0-77207), United States Navy, for conspicuous gallantry and intrepidity in action against the enemy while serving as Torpedo and Gunnery Officer and later as Executive Officer on two war patrols of the Submarine U.S.S. STURGEON II (SS-187), during World War II. Largely through Lieutenant Nimitz' effort the Torpedo Armament of the U.S.S. STURGEON has functioned with above average performance. This, together with his skillful operation of the Torpedo Instruments contributed greatly to the success in the many actions of the U.S.S. STURGEON with the enemy which resulted in sinking or greatly damaging much enemy shipping. Further during one War Patrol, on 6 April 1942, the U.S.S. STURGEON was ordered to conduct a reconnaissance and rescue R.A.F. personnel on a small island in enemy-controlled waters off the entrance to Tjilaijap, Java. He conducted this reconnaissance with two men in a small submarine power boat, close inshore to the designated island and definitely determined that the personnel were not there to be rescued. This hazardous maneuver in a stormy sea was exceedingly well executed by himself at great personal risk to his own personal safety. The actions of Lieutenant Nimitz on these occasions were in keeping with the highest traditions of the United States Naval Service.

=== Silver Star citation (second award) ===
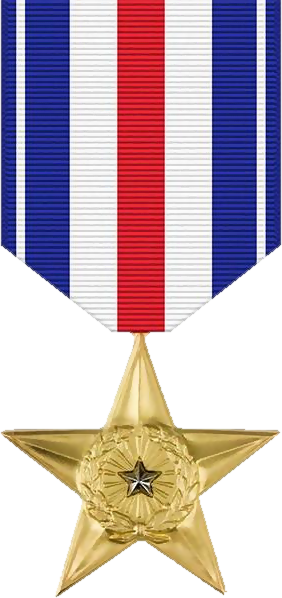

Commander 7th Fleet: Serial 01056 (May 7, 1944)

The President of the United States of America takes pleasure in presenting a Gold Star in lieu of a Second Award of the Silver Star to Lieutenant Commander Chester William Nimitz, Jr. (NSN: 0-77207), United States Navy, for conspicuous heroism and the performance of duty as Executive Officer, Navigator and Assistant Approach Officer during the FIRST and SECOND War Patrols of the U.S.S. BLUEFISH (SS-222) from 9 September 1943 to November 1943. Lieutenant Commander Nimitz's services as Assistant Approach Officer were indispensable in actions resulting in sinking 38,929 tons of enemy shipping and in damaging 50,700 tons. His skill in navigation enabled his vessel to operate successfully close inshore in the hazardous enemy controlled waters of the East Indies and South China Seas. His conduct as Executive Officer contributed greatly to the high state of morale of the ship. His actions were in keeping with the highest traditions of the United States Naval Service.

=== Silver Star citation (third award) ===
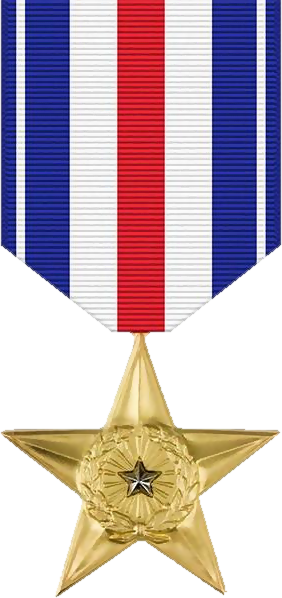

Commander Submarine Forces Pacific Fleet: Serial 0409 (September 13, 1946)

The President of the United States of America takes pleasure in presenting a Second Gold Star in lieu of a Third Award of the Silver Star to Lieutenant Chester William Nimitz, Jr. (NSN: 0-77207), United States Navy, for conspicuous gallantry and intrepidity in action in the performance of his duties on the U.S.S. STURGEON (SS-187) during the SECOND War Patrol of that Submarine in enemy controlled waters from 29 December 1941 to 13 February 1942. As Torpedo and Gunnery Officer, his excellent supervision of torpedo personnel and their maintenance of torpedo equipment, and efficient direction of torpedo reloads during attacks contributed materially to his vessel's success in sinking of three enemy ships totaling 20,600 tons. His coolness and high devotion to duty contributed directly to the success of his vessel in evading enemy countermeasures. His conduct throughout was an inspiration to the officers and men in his ship, and were in keeping with the highest traditions of the United States Naval Service.
