= Museum of the Marine =

Coordinates: 34.770232°N 77.406921°W

Carolina Museum of the Marine
- Location: Jacksonville, North Carolina; United States
- Type: Military
- Website: Museum of the Marine

The Carolina Museum of the Marine is a 25,000-square-foot museum in Jacksonville, North Carolina, adjacent to Marine Corps Base Camp Lejeune. Dedicated to honoring and preserving the legacy of Carolina Marines and Sailors, the museum features immersive exhibits that tell the stories of individual service members, Marine families, military communities, and the values of leadership, service, and sacrifice that define the Marine Corps experience.

== See also ==
- Marine Corps Museums
- United States Marine Corps
- USS LSM-45
