= Freedom Park (Omaha, Nebraska) =

- U.S.S. HAZARD and U.S.S. MARLIN
- U.S. National Register of Historic Places
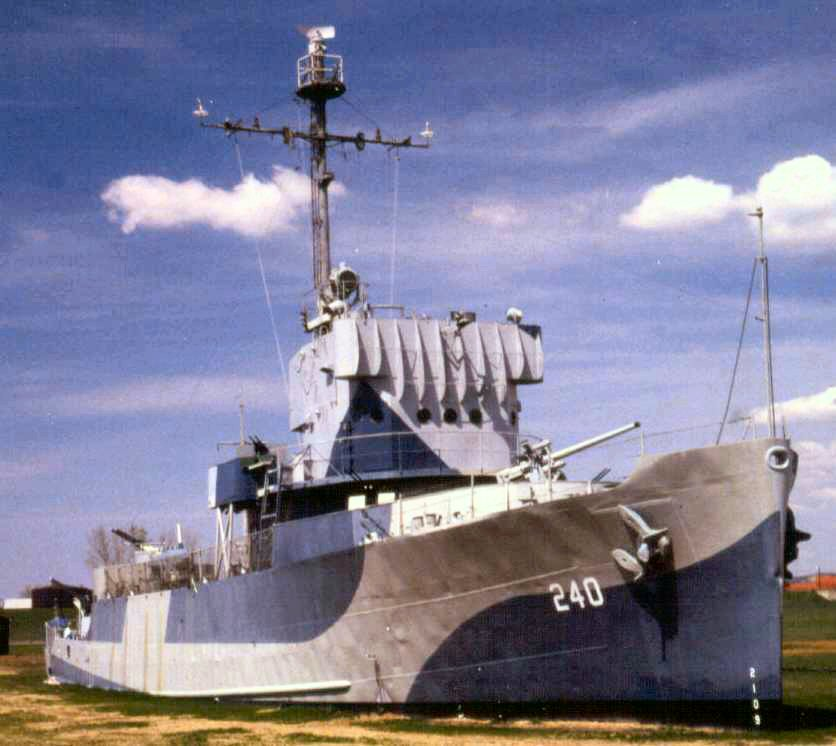
- USS Hazard (AM-240)

- Location within Nebraska Location within the United States
- Location: 2500 N. 24th St., Omaha, Nebraska
- Coordinates: 41°16′35″N 95°54′5″W
- Area: less than one acre
- Built: 1944
- Built by: Winslow Marine (Hazard); Electric Boat Division (Marlin)
- NRHP reference No.: 79001444
- Added to NRHP: January 17, 1979

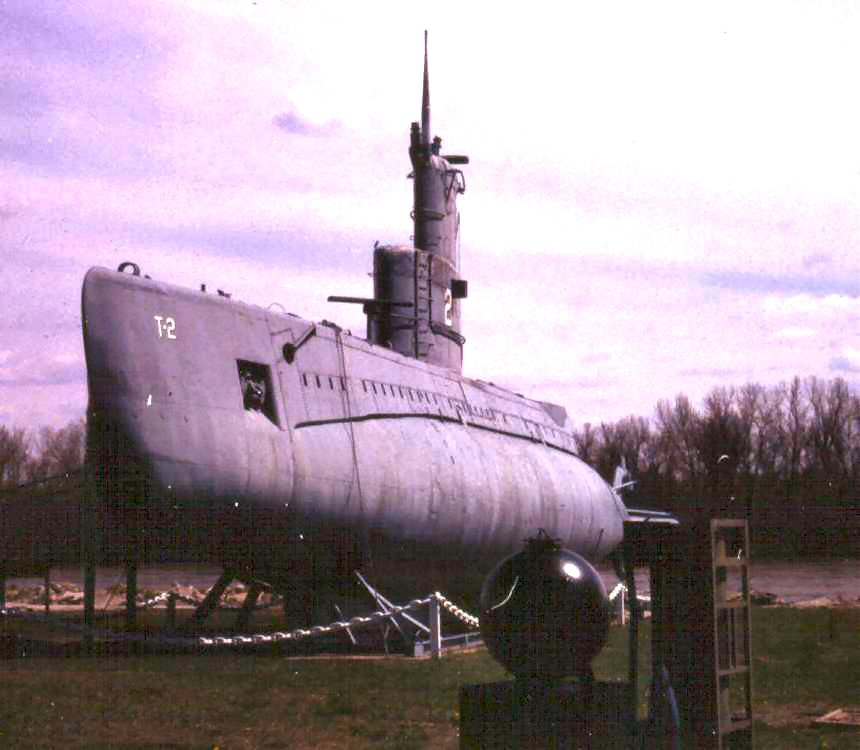
USS Marlin (SST-2) at Freedom Park.

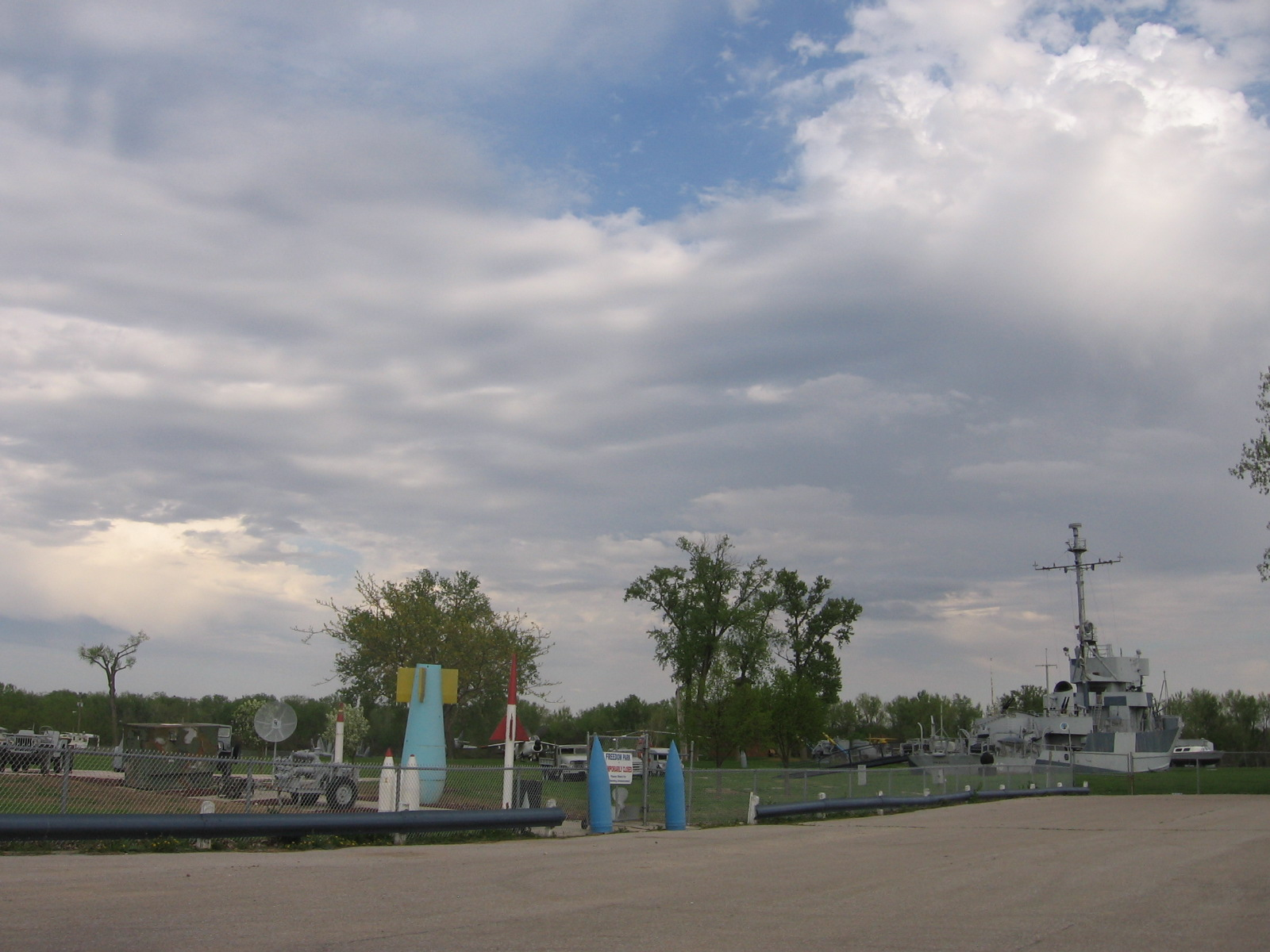
Freedom Park overview from parking lot.

Freedom Park is an outdoor park and museum at the Greater Omaha Marina on the bank of the Missouri River at 2497 Freedom Park Road in the East Omaha section of Omaha, Nebraska. It displays numerous military aircraft and artillery pieces along with its two major exhibits, the World War II minesweeper USS Hazard (AM-240) and Cold War-era training submarine USS Marlin (SST-2). The park closed as a result of flooding along the Missouri River in 2011, but reopened on October 7, 2015 after four years of restoration and cleanup work.

== Exhibits ==
- USS Hazard (AM-240)
- USS Marlin (SST-2)
- USS Towers (DDG-9) (Gig)
- Douglas A-4C Skyhawk (marked with US Navy BuNo 149618)
- LTV A-7D Corsair II (AF serial no. 69-6191)
- Sikorsky HH-52A Seaguard (USCG 1370)

=== Nameplates ===
- USS Huntington (CL-107)
- USS Dayton (CL-105)
- USS Thetis Bay (CVE-90)
- USS Houston (CL-81)
- USS Conger (SS-477)
- USS William T. Powell (DE-213)
- USS Spangenberg (DE-223)
- USS Sarda (SS-488)
- USS Toro (SS-422)
- USS Corsair (SS-435)

=== Anchors ===
- USS Decatur (DD-341)
- USS Wasp (CV-18)

Previously the medium landing ship USS LSM-45 was anchored at the park, but she was moved to North Carolina in the spring of 2004, and was later scrapped .

=== Propellers ===
- USS General A. W. Brewster (AP-155)

== See also ==
- Parks in Omaha
