= USS Spangenberg =

Buckley-class destroyer escort

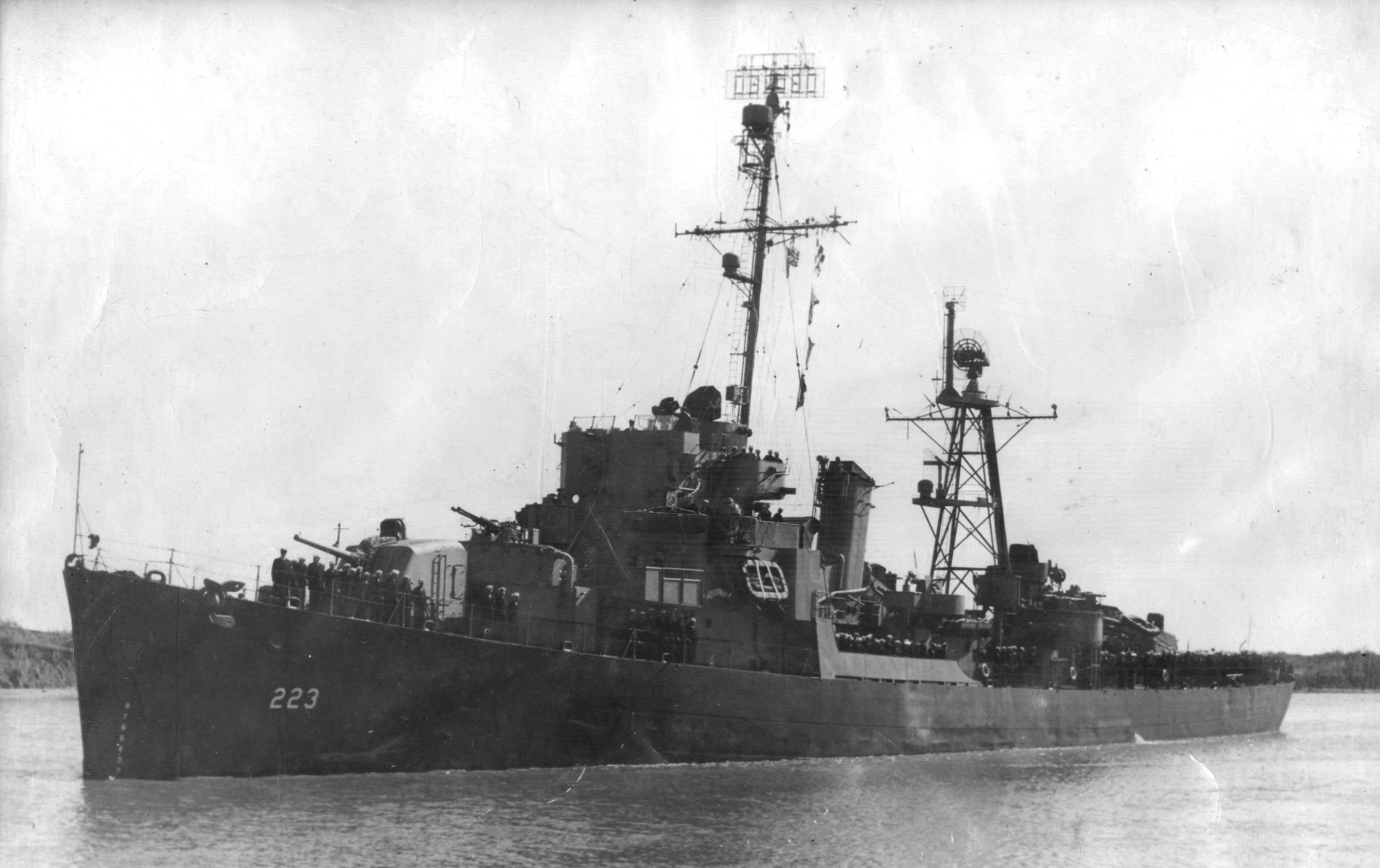

History

United States
- Name: USS Spangenberg
- Namesake: Kenneth J. Spangenberg
- Ordered: 1942
- Builder: Philadelphia Navy Yard, Philadelphia, Pennsylvania
- Laid down: 5 April 1943
- Launched: 3 July 1943
- Commissioned: 15 March 1944
- Decommissioned: 18 October 1947
- Reclassified: DER-223, March 1949; DE-223, 1 December 1954
- Stricken: 1 November 1965
- Fate: Sold for scrap, 3 October 1966

General characteristics
- Class & type: Buckley-class destroyer escort
- Displacement: 1,400 long tons (1,422 t) standard; 1,740 long tons (1,768 t) full load
- Length: 306 ft (93 m)
- Beam: 37 ft (11 m)
- Draft: 9 ft 6 in (2.90 m) standard; 11 ft 3 in (3.43 m) full load
- Propulsion: 2 × boilers; General Electric turbo-electric drive; 12,000 shp (8.9 MW); 2 × solid manganese-bronze 3,600 lb (1,600 kg) 3-bladed propellers, 8 ft 6 in (2.59 m) diameter, 7 ft 7 in (2.31 m) pitch; 2 × rudders; 359 tons fuel oil
- Speed: 23 knots (43 km/h; 26 mph)
- Range: 3,700 nmi (6,900 km) at 15 kn (28 km/h; 17 mph); 6,000 nmi (11,000 km) at 12 kn (22 km/h; 14 mph)
- Complement: 15 officers, 198 men
- Armament: 3 × 3"/50 caliber guns; 1 × quad 1.1"/75 caliber gun; 8 × single 20 mm guns; 1 × triple 21-inch (533 mm) torpedo tubes; 1 × Hedgehog anti-submarine mortar; 8 × K-gun depth charge projectors; 2 × depth charge tracks

USS Spangenberg (DE/DER-223), a Buckley-class destroyer escort of the United States Navy, was named in honor of Gunner's Mate Kenneth J. Spangenberg (1922–1942), who died as a result of wounds suffered during the Naval Battle of Guadalcanal, while serving aboard the heavy cruiser San Francisco (CA-38). He was posthumously awarded the Navy Cross.

Spangenberg, a destroyer escort, was laid down on 5 April 1943 by the Philadelphia Navy Yard; launched on 3 July 1943; sponsored by Mrs. Gussie Spangenberg; and commissioned on 15 April 1944.

== Service history ==
=== World War II, 1944–1945 ===
After completing trials around Philadelphia and Norfolk, Virginia and shakedown in the vicinity of Bermuda, Spangenberg returned to Norfolk on 1 June. She served temporarily as school ship for student officers and as escort to coastwise merchant traffic before beginning duty with transatlantic convoys. On 13 July, the destroyer escort joined Escort Division 66 (CortDiv 66) and put to sea the next day from Hampton Roads, Virginia, in the screen of a convoy bound for the Mediterranean Sea. The convoy, UGS 48, made a fairly quiet passage until the day before it reached Bizerte, Tunisia. At 01:00 on 1 August, a flight of about 20 German bombers attacked the formation. Spangenberg was able to lay a good smoke screen which helped to prevent the German attack from damaging the American ships. This was Spangenberg's only brush with the Luftwaffe. The convoy made Bizerte on 2 August, and Spangenberg stayed for 11 days before sailing for the United States on the 13th. She reached Boston on the 28.

From 9/17 September, CortDiv 66 conducted training exercises at Casco Bay, Maine. Spangenberg returned to Hampton Roads on 20 September and, two days later, sailed in the screen of convoy UGS 55, headed for North Africa. She was at Bizerte from 12–18 October; then she screened the convoy back to the United States and arrived in Boston on 6 November. Spangenberg and the other ships of CortDiv 66 conducted more exercises at Casco Bay and, at the end of November, moved to Argentia, Newfoundland, to act as killer group for Task Unit 27.1.2. She conducted anti-submarine searches around Argentia and Halifax until February 1945 and, on one occasion, made a depth charge attack on a sound contact, but scored no kill. The destroyer escort spent February operating with friendly submarines in Block Island Sound, Long Island Sound, and in the area south of Block Island.

Spangenberg began an availability period at Boston on 3 March. After a short cruise to Casco Bay on 20/21 March, she got underway for Horta in the Azores, en route to England. She arrived in Liverpool on 3 April. From that port, she moved to Derry in Northern Ireland. There CortDiv 66, under British control, operated as an anti-submarine escort group out of Derry and out of Milford Haven, England. Spangenberg returned to the United States at New York City on 1 June 1945 and was converted to a radar picket destroyer escort.

=== Post-war activities, 1945–1947 ===
At the completion of her conversion and post-conversion trials, Spangenberg sailed from New York for Port Arthur, Texas, to participate in the Navy Day celebration. On 3 November 1945, she headed toward Guantanamo Bay, Cuba, for three weeks of refresher training. The destroyer escort departed Cuban waters on the 26 and returned to Norfolk, Virginia. For the next 18 months, Spangenberg sailed up and down the eastern coast of the United States engaged in training exercises. During that period, she left that area only once, in May/June 1947, to carry scientists of the Naval Research Laboratory south of the equator to observe an eclipse of the sun. She returned the scientists to Washington, D.C., on 9 June, stopped at Norfolk for a month, and then reported to Charleston, South Carolina, on 18 July 1947 for inactivation.

=== In reserve, 1947–1966 ===
Spangenberg remained berthed at Charleston as a unit of the Atlantic Reserve Fleet for almost 18 years. In March 1949, she was redesignated a radar picket destroyer escort, DER-223, but, on 1 December 1954, reverted to a destroyer escort, DE-223. Spangenberg's name was struck from the Navy List on 1 November 1965 and, on 4 October 1966, her hulk was sold to the North American Smelting Company of Wilmington, Delaware, for scrapping. Her name plate is on display at the Freedom Park.
