= USS Chivo =

Submarine of the United States

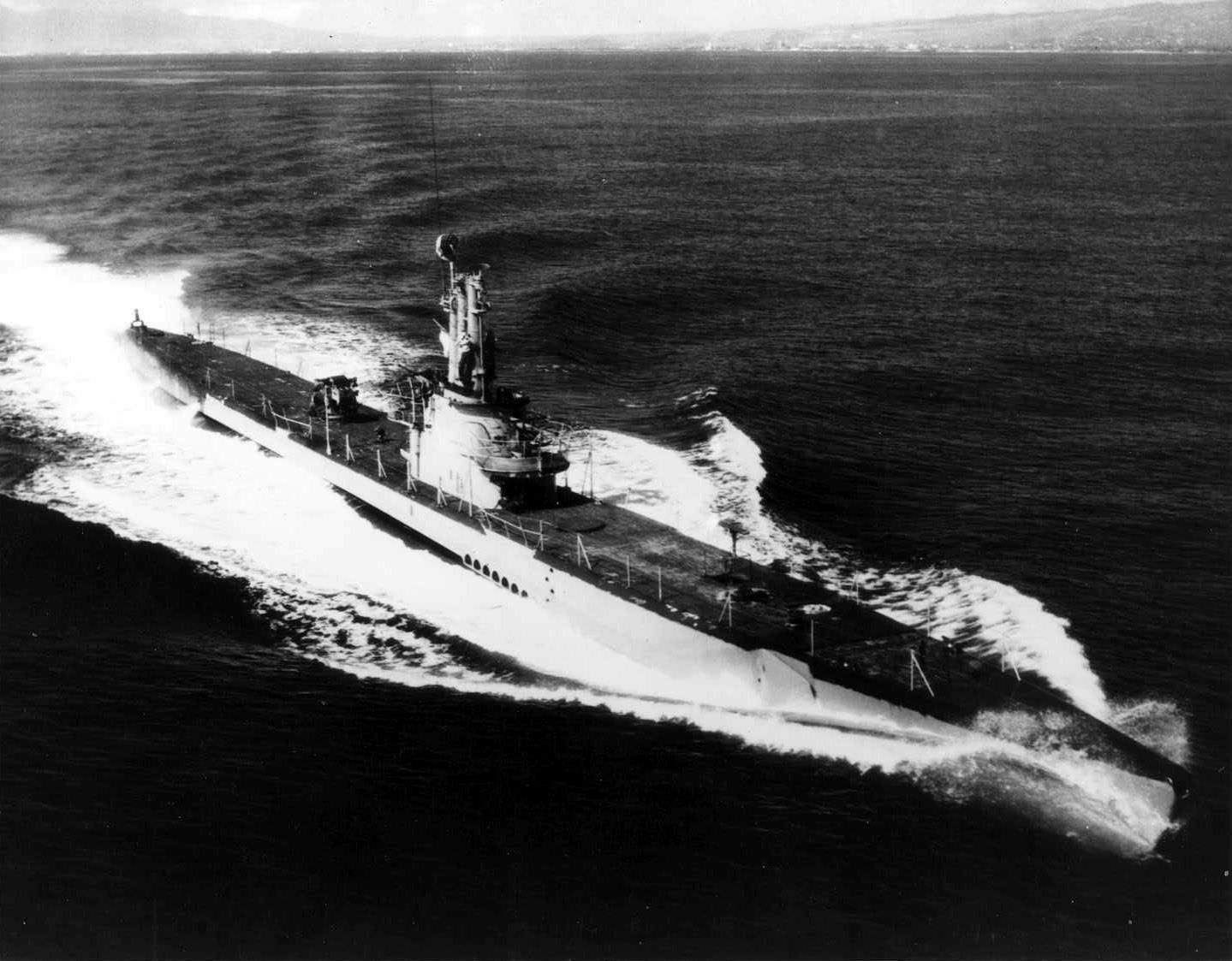
- Chivo (SS-341), underway, c. 1945-50, off the Hawaiian coast.

History

United States
- Name: USS Chivo
- Builder: Electric Boat Company, Groton, Connecticut
- Laid down: 21 February 1944
- Launched: 14 January 1945
- Commissioned: 28 April 1945
- Decommissioned: 1 July 1971
- Stricken: 1 July 1971
- Identification: SS-341
- Fate: Transferred to Argentina, 1 July 1971

Argentina
- Name: ARA Santiago del Estero
- Acquired: 1 July 1971
- Decommissioned: January 1981
- Identification: S-22
- Fate: Sold for scrap, 1983

General characteristics (As completed)
- Class & type: Balao-class diesel-electric submarine
- Displacement: 1,526 tons (1,550 t) surfaced; 2,424 tons (2,463 t) submerged
- Length: 311 ft 9 in (95.02 m)
- Beam: 27 ft 3 in (8.31 m)
- Draft: 16 ft 10 in (5.13 m) maximum
- Propulsion: 4 × General Motors Model 16-278A V16 diesel engines driving electrical generators; 2 × 126-cell Sargo batteries; 4 × high-speed General Electric electric motors with reduction gears; 2 × propellers; 5,400 shp (4.0 MW) surfaced; 2,740 shp (2.0 MW) submerged
- Speed: 20.25 knots (38 km/h) surfaced; 8.75 knots (16 km/h) submerged
- Range: 11,000 nautical miles (20,000 km) surfaced at 10 knots (19 km/h)
- Endurance: 48 hours at 2 knots (3.7 km/h) submerged; 75 days on patrol
- Test depth: 400 ft (120 m)
- Complement: 10 officers, 70–71 enlisted
- Armament: 10 × 21-inch (533 mm) torpedo tubes; 6 forward, 4 aft; 24 torpedoes; 1 × 5-inch (127 mm) / 25 caliber deck gun; Bofors 40 mm and Oerlikon 20 mm cannon

General characteristics (Guppy IA)
- Class & type: none
- Displacement: 1,830 tons (1,859 t) surfaced; 2,440 tons (2,479 t) submerged
- Length: 307 ft 7 in (93.8 m)
- Beam: 27 ft 4 in (8.3 m)
- Draft: 17 ft (5.2 m)
- Propulsion: Snorkel added; Batteries upgraded to Sargo II
- Speed: Surfaced: 17.3 knots (32.0 km/h) maximum; 12.5 knots (23.2 km/h) cruising; Submerged: 15.0 knots (27.8 km/h) for ½ hour; 7.5 knots (13.9 km/h) snorkeling; 3.0 knots (5.6 km/h) cruising
- Range: 17,000 nm (28,000 km) surfaced at 11 knots (20 km/h)
- Endurance: 36 hours at 3 knots (6 km/h) submerged
- Complement: 10 officers; 5 petty officers; 64–69 enlisted men
- Armament: 10 × 21 inch (533 mm) torpedo tubes; (six forward, four aft); all guns removed

USS Chivo (SS-341), a Balao-class submarine, was a ship of the United States Navy named for the "chivo" or big-scaled goatfish Pseudopenaeus grandisquamis, a fish inhabiting the Pacific Ocean between Panama and Mexico.

Chivo was launched 14 January 1945 by Electric Boat Company, Groton, Conn.; sponsored by Mrs. Edith Lindholm Baldwin, wife of Raymond E. Baldwin, the governor of Connecticut; and commissioned 28 April 1945.

== 1945–1950 ==
Chivo departed New London 7 June 1945 for Key West where she trained and exercised briefly at the sound school and experimental torpedo range, before sailing on to Pearl Harbor in company with Requin and Redfish. While the submarine was preparing for her first war patrol, hostilities ended; Chivo then remained at Pearl Harbor, operating locally with other ships of the Pacific Fleet. Assigned to Submarine Squadron Seven (SubRon 7), she returned to the States in October, basing out of San Diego, California for local operations which continued until January 1946, when Chivo sailed for a short tour of duty operating out of Subic Bay in the Philippines. Returning to San Diego in May, the submarine exercised along the west coast for the next 15 months, a period culminating in an overhaul at Mare Island Naval Shipyard.

Growing tensions in Asia, provoked in part by French conflict with the Vietminh in Indochina and disagreements over the future of Korea, encouraged the Navy to conduct more realistic training for submariners. As part of this general approach, Chivo began a three-month simulated war patrol in August 1947 which took her to Suva, Fiji Islands; Guam; and Japan; before she arrived back at San Diego in November. West coast duty continued for her until mid-1949 when she was transferred to the Atlantic Fleet, arriving at her new home port of Naval Station Key West and Submarine Squadron Four (SubRon 4) on 4 July 1949. During her transit there the boat's movement reports describe one of the hazards of sailing in the warm waters in the West Indies when Chivo "struck unidentified submerged object, possibly turtle." The submarine provided training and services for Atlantic Fleet ships in intertype exercises until 30 October 1950 when she arrived at New London to begin an extensive Greater Underwater Propulsion Program (GUPPY 1-A) overhaul and modernization. The modifications included streamlining the hull and superstructure, adding a snorkel to allow diesel engine operation while at periscope depth and increasing overall battery power.

== 1951–1960 ==
With increased power and a new streamlined shape, Chivo returned to duty with the Atlantic Fleet in July 1951, resuming anti-submarine warfare (ASW) training operations with surface ships as well as maintaining proficiency in anti-shipping and mine warfare. These drills and exercises took place mainly off Key West and Guantanamo Bay. This regular training continued until 19 April 1952 when Chivo sailed for a short cruise with the 6th Fleet in the Mediterranean, visiting Augusta, Sicily; Cannes and Marseille, France; and Naples, Italy; before returning home via the Azores in June.

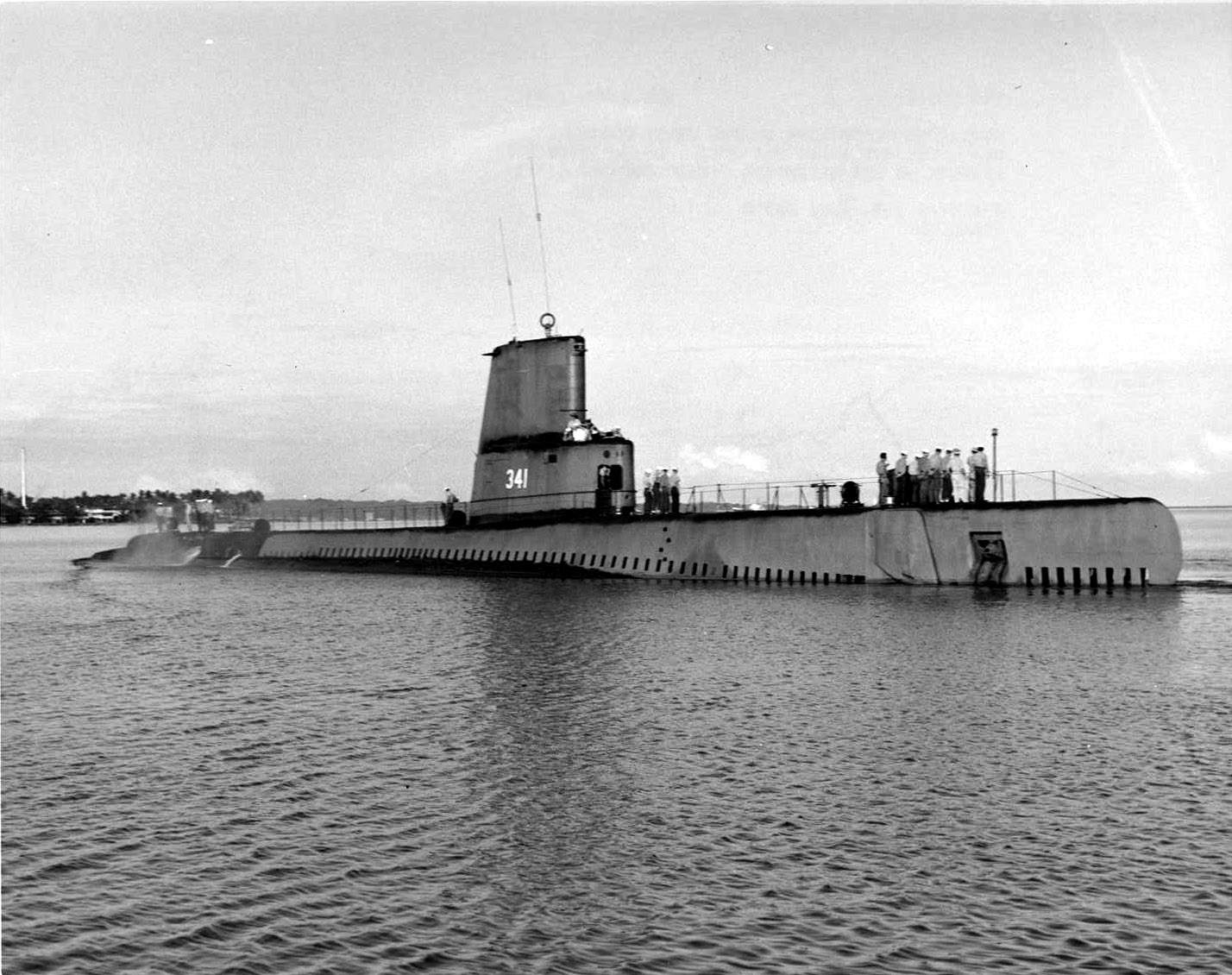
Chivo, after modernization, 1953.

Assigned to Submarine Squadron Twelve (SubRon 12) upon her return to Key West, the submarine resumed her familiar training routine with the Fleet Sonar School interspersed with port visits to Havana, Cuba; Montego Bay, Jamaica; and Port-au-Prince, Haiti. Aside from a three-month overhaul at Philadelphia between January and May 1953, Chivo remained in the West Indies until October when the submarine transited the Panama Canal for a month of operations off the Pacific coast of Colombia. This training period continued until May 1954 when the boat began a four-month regular overhaul at Charleston Naval Shipyard. She again returned to Fleet Sonar School duty in September, with such employment put on hold in March 1955 for a ten-week battery renewal restricted availability. In a change to her normal schedule, the submarine visited Gulfport, Mississippi, in March 1956 and New York City in August of that same year. After another visit to Gulfport in January 1957 to train reservists, and Santiago de Cuba in February, Chivo commenced an overhaul at Charleston Naval Shipyard in March. Returning to normal duty out of Key West in September, the boat remained there save for the occasional port visit to Gulf Ports until transferred to Charleston and Submarine Squadron Four in July 1959, a shift completed after a short cruise north to Boston, and Quebec City, Canada the previous month. Chivo resumed her familiar ASW services out of Charleston shortly thereafter, a duty she continued in January 1960 with ASW services to patrol aircraft off Bermuda. She followed that with another overhaul at Charleston Naval Shipyard between March and September, with repairs and modifications that included a new sonar system.

On 4 October 1960 Chivo began her first out-of-area cruise in eight years, though she first sailed south to St. Thomas, Virgin Islands, for a two-week amphibious exercise with the 2d Reconnaissance Company, Fleet Marine Force. The submarine then sailed to South Africa, via Trinidad, British West Indies, for Operation CAPEX-60, a joint ASW exercise with British, French, Portuguese and South African ships and aircraft. While en route, the boat held the traditional crossing-the-line ceremonies at the equator. As put by the Navy Times, "Although greatly outnumbered, the fifteen 'shellbacks' kept complete control as they initiated the 'polywogs' into the Ancient Order of the Deep." The exercise, which included port visits to Simonstown, Port Elizabeth and Cape Town, lasted through November and Chivo did not return home to Charleston, via San Juan, Puerto Rico, until 21 December.

== 1961–1971 ==
Over the next few years, Chivo continued to specialize in her role as an "opposition force" (i.e. Soviet) submarine during ASW training exercises. These included pretending to launch a ballistic missile at the United States, disrupting "blue force" amphibious convoys or attempting submerged transits against reconnaissance aircraft patrols. In the latter case during Operation DeltEx XV in October 1962, Chivo managed to stay undetected during a three-day submerged transit opposed by aircraft from Norfolk and Bermuda. In addition to conducting similar exercises in 1963, the submarine also received a plastic fairwater to help with underwater speed during a regular overhaul at Charleston between February and June 1964.

On 4 January 1965 the submarine got underway for her second Mediterranean deployment, stopping at Lisbon, Portugal; and Rota, Spain; before beginning a series of exercises with North Atlantic Treaty Organization (NATO) forces off Italy and Turkey. The boat sailed for home from Athens, Greece, on 14 April and arrived, via Rota, on 2 May. Chivo spent the rest of the year conducting her usual local training operations, including a specialized mine planting exercise. A regularly scheduled five-month overhaul took place at Charleston in early 1966, followed by type training and the usual ASW services to various Atlantic Fleet units. During this period Chivo also participated in the final weapons range acceptance tests for the Atlantic Undersea Test and Evaluation Center (AUTEC) in the Bahama Islands.

Local operations continued into 1967, with Chivo servicing warships and submarines out of Guantanamo Bay and conducting prospective commanding officer training in nearby operating areas. This routine was only broken in January 1968 when the submarine participated in destroyer-submarine Exercise Springboard I, a six-week exercise that allowed Chivo to conduct forty-eight torpedo firings at surface and sub-surface targets, greatly improving the skill of the fire control team. Following upkeep alongside submarine tender Howard W. Gilmore, the submarine then sailed north on 26 May to assist in Search and Rescue operations for Scorpion, with Chivo assisting in tracing the intended track of the wrecked submarine. During November, Chivo provided services for the AUTEC range at Bermuda before ending the year at Charleston. After another overhaul between January and August 1969, the submarine conducted refresher and type training in preparation for Exercise Springboard II in January 1970. After a port visit to San Juan, Puerto Rico, in mid-January, the boat sailed north to Portsmouth, Virginia, for repairs. She then conducted two months of training services out of Guantanamo Bay before returning to Charleston on 28 April.

At this time, the Navy — needing money and qualified manpower elsewhere — reduced Chivo's manning level to 43 sailors and placed the boat in cadre or "non-operational" status. A service inspection completed on 16 February 1971 determined the boat was unfit for further service, as Chivo was "far below the standards of a Guppy III submarine considered the minimum required to meet the increasing demands of present and future submarine warfare requirements." Although temporarily returned to active duty on 26 February 1971, the status change was in preparation for her transfer to a foreign navy that summer. There was still time for providing training and services, however, and the submarine conducted operational readiness exercises with Seahorse in March; mainly conducting trailing, approach and torpedo firing exercises with the newer nuclear-powered submarine. Chivo provided the same "opposition force" training for Sunfish in April and Whale in May. These services ended when Argentine Naval personnel arrived at Charleston on 15 June to receive two weeks of underway training with Chivo's crew, focusing on diving, surfacing and snorkeling evolutions.

Chivo decommissioned at Charleston Navy Yard on 1 July 1971 and was struck from the Navy List that same day.

== Argentine service ==
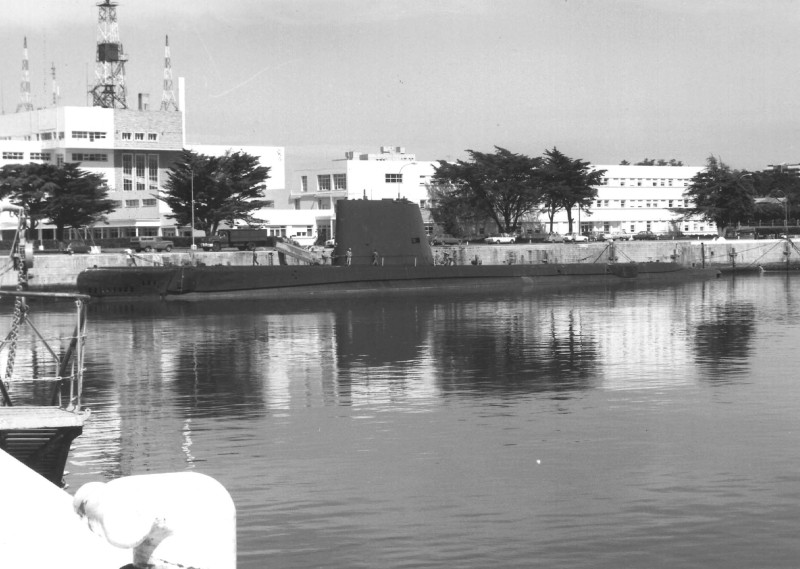
Santiago del Estero, Argentine Naval Base Mar del Plata

The submarine was transferred (sold) to Argentina, under terms of the Security Assistance Program on 1 July 1971. She served in the Argentine Navy (Armada de la República Argentina) as ARA Santiago del Estero (S-22), the third submarine to be named in honor of Santiago del Estero Province. This submarine played a minor role in the Falklands War. She had not participated in exercises since 1980, her sonar had been removed in 1981, and she had been decommissioned in September 1981.

By the start of the Falklands War on 2 April 1982, Santiago del Estero could not submerge, but she could still move on the surface. The British had no satellite technology at the time and eventually got the aid of the United States, which had available three satellites. One was of the HEXAGON/KH-9 type, launched on 11 May 1982, which had the problem that the film had to be ejected towards the Earth and picked up near Hawaii, and then transported by air towards the continent. The other were two KENNAN/KH-11, the most modern in the world, and could pass the encrypted information directly to a station in the US and from there it would be transmitted to the headquarters in Northwood, UK. In April, the United States had the KH-11/4 moved away from its orbit above the USSR and this satellite was observing Argentine bases both in the continent and the islands. Once received, he information was passed from Northwood to both Task Forces in the South Atlantic: TF 317 (Surface fleet) and TF 324 (submarine fleet); the latter commanded by Admiral Peter Herbert. The British had put the emphasis on the four Argentine submarines, as well as on Argentina's sole aircraft carrier ARA Veinticinco de Mayo (V-2); the latter was detected navigating south of Gulf San Jorge. However, Santiago del Estero (S-22), which was believed to be non-operational at the time, could not be seen since 21 April. The Argentine Navy knew about the satellite technology monitoring the mainland, and the submarine, which was not capable of submerging, had been towed by night toward Puerto Belgrano Naval Base, and there she was successfully camouflaged between two transports. The information was very important for the British; since after the capture of Santiago del Estero′s sister ship ARA Santa Fe (S-21) at South Georgia, during Operation Paraquet, there were only three Argentine submarines, and it was necessary to find where the Argentine submarines were, as to prevent attacks on British submarines by mistake. It took until 28 May for the American-British satellital technology to find Santiago del Estero. She was seen in the base together with two old World War II American destroyers, one modern Type 42, and the only aircraft carrier, in a day in which weather conditions made possible for the satellite to effectively distinguish them.

The other Argentine submarines had different performances in the war. ARA San Luis (S-32), a German Type 209/1200, had returned to Puerto Belgrano Naval Base on 19 May, after a 39-day patrol north of the Falklands, in which she spent 864 hours submerged. San Luis′s sister ship ARA Salta (S-31) had many problems at the time with her torpedo tubes and was conducting several tests of them, navigating in continental waters from 21 May. She finally arrived at her base on 29 May.

Santiago del Estero was disposed of in 1983.

== See also ==
- ARA Santiago del Estero for other Argentine ships named Santiago del Estero
- https://www.elsnorkel.com/2015/04/guerra-de-malvinas-satelites-cia-y-el.html
