= NPA =

NPA may refer to:

== Organizations and companies ==
=== Companies ===
- National Prescription Administrators, a former pharmaceutical company in the United States
- Network Printing Alliance, a group of printer manufacturers
- Northern Pacific Airways, a US low-cost airline

=== Associations ===
- National Parks Association (disambiguation)
- National Pasta Association, an association for the United States pasta industry
- National Pawnbrokers Association, an American-based trade association
- National Pharmacy Association, a trade association in the UK
- National Ploughing Association, organises the National Ploughing Championships in Ireland
- National Postdoctoral Association, an organization for postdoctoral researchers in the United States
- Network Professional Association, an advocate for the international network computing professional in the United States

=== Other organizations ===
- National People's Action, a community organizing network in the United States
- National Physicians Alliance, a multi-specialty medical organization in the United States
- Norwegian People's Aid, a non-governmental labour and humanitarian organization in Norway

== Government and politics ==
- National Pacification Army, Chinese anti-Kuomintang warlord army formed in 1926
- National park authority, a term used in the United Kingdom for the legal body in charge of a national park
- National Party of Australia, an Australian political party
- National People's Ambassadors, a South African political party
- National People's Army, the armed forces of the former German Democratic Republic (GDR)
- Sardar Vallabhbhai Patel National Police Academy, Indian national institute for training of Indian Police Service (IPS) officers
- National Police Agency (disambiguation)
- National Port Authority, Liberia
- National Production Authority, a former agency of the United States government for defense mobilization from 1950 to 1953
- National Prosecuting Authority, a governing body of the Republic of South Africa
- New Anticapitalist Party (Nouveau Parti Anticapitaliste), a far-left French political party
- New People's Army, armed wing of the Communist Party of the Philippines
- Nigerian Ports Authority, a government agency that governs and operates the ports of Nigeria
- No party affiliation (disambiguation), a voter or politician who is not affiliated with any political party
- Non-Party Affiliate, a politician who is not affiliated with any political party
- Non-Partisan Association, a civic political party in Vancouver, British Columbia
- Note Printing Australia, a subsidiary of the Reserve Bank of Australia
- Transnet National Ports Authority of South Africa
- NPA Satellite Mapping, a UK remote sensing company

== Law ==
- Non-Prosecution Agreement, a way to avoid prosecution (similar to a Deferred Prosecution Agreement)

== Science and medicine ==
- N-Propyl-L-arginine, a chemical substance
- Nitropropionic acid
- 1-N-Naphthylphthalamic acid, an auxin plant hormone transport inhibitor
- Nanopascal (nPa), a unit of pressure
- Nasopharyngeal airway, a tube that is designed to be inserted into the nasal passageway
- Niemann–Pick disease type A, a genetic disorder

== Miscellaneous ==
- Naval Air Station Pensacola (airport code), Pensacola, Florida, United States
- .NET Persistence API, also known as NPersistence
- Non-performing asset, banking term for loans in jeopardy of default, ones that have not paid principal or interest for 90+ days
- Northcoast Preparatory and Performing Arts Academy, a high school in Arcata, California, United States
- Northland Preparatory Academy, a middle and high school in Flagstaff, Arizona, United States
- Numbering Plan Area, a geographic area assigned a three-digit area code in the North American Numbering Plan (NANP)
- Neutral Paralympic Athletes; see Neutral Paralympic Athletes at the 2018 Winter Paralympics and Neutral Paralympic Athletes at the 2024 Summer Paralympics
