= Nigel Press =

British geologist (born 1949)

Nigel Press (born 8 March 1949) is a British geologist who pioneered the development of commercial applications of satellite earth observation technology in geo-science, and founded Europe's longest standing satellite mapping company. Press is a Fellow of The Geological Society of London and of The Royal Geographical Society. He is also the former chair of MapAction.

== Early life ==
Educated at The King's School, Canterbury and Imperial College London, Press graduated in Mining Geology in 1970 with underground experience in nickel, copper and lead-zinc mines. He worked briefly in geochemical exploration before commencing postgraduate work at Imperial on the potential applications of remote sensing for geological exploration, in anticipation of the launch of the first civilian earth observation satellites. Specifically, this focussed on the possible detection of the toxic effects of soil-bound heavy metals on vegetation as a mineral exploration tool.

== Career ==
In 1972, Press founded Nigel Press Associates Ltd (NPA) to continue his research in the commercial arena with an emphasis on structural mapping and photogeology. During the 1970s, in conjunction with Dutch geologist Dr. Wim Kampschuur, the Tectosat Exploration System was developed, using brittle fracture patterns found on satellite imagery as a means of better understanding mechanisms and consequences of plate tectonics. Studies were undertaken on a continent-wide scale throughout Europe (including the Greenland-Norwegian basin), Africa, Arabia and parts of India, linking extensive, specially collected field data to satellite interpretation. The studies were subscribed to by most of the world's major oil companies as well as mining companies and international organisations such as UNDP. These studies formed the foundation on which further interpretation has been made worldwide by NPA Satellite Mapping (now Viridien) up to the present day.

During this period, NPA became the leading commercial supplier of imagery from different satellite sources and the go-to supplier for photo-mosaicked images, and later, digitally processed images and mosaics - a forerunner service to today's Google Earth. With the advent of the European Space Agency's radar satellites in the early 1990s, Press, in conjunction with Dr Geoff Lawrence, led NPA to develop Offshore Basin Screening using sea surface roughness patterns observed on radar imagery to detect slicks caused by traces of hydrocarbons seeping from the sea floor. This technique has become a universally recognised complimentary data source to seismic surveying and other offshore exploration tools, and is used by most of the world's major oil companies who draw on a global database compiled and maintained by Viridien.

Growing availability of satellite radar during the 1990s led Press to focus NPA on developing methods using interferometric principles to detect small amounts of ground surface movement that remain difficult to survey with ground-based techniques. The ability to measure millimetric-level surface changes due to both geological and anthropogenic effects introduced a new dimension to environmental studies in disciplines ranging from earthquake and volcano studies to groundwater and oil extraction and engineering geology.

Press was instrumental in founding British Association of Remote Sensing Companies (BARSC) and served several terms as chair. He was an advisor to the DG of BNSC and an Executive Member of The Parliamentary Space Committee.

In 2008, Press sold NPA to Fugro, who in turn sold NPA to Viridien (formerly CGG) when they divested of their Geological exploration activities in 2012. Press is no longer directly involved in the activities of Viridien.

Press has been involved with the humanitarian disaster relief charity MapAction since its inception and NPA provided background support for many years. On retiring from NPA Press became MapAction board secretary and then chair from 2015 to 2021. He remains active as a consultant in satellite mapping and intelligence, including disaster risk reduction as well as satellite and fibre optic communications.

== Private life ==
Press rowed with University of London crews from 1967 to 1973 and is still active at masters level.

He is an experienced chorister and has performed, recorded and broadcast with several specialist chamber choirs. He was Chairman of the Thomas Tallis Society (thomas-tallis-society.org.uk) from 2002 to 2025.

Press is married to landscape artist Julia Corfe.
