= Carl Nolte =

American journalist (born c. 1933)

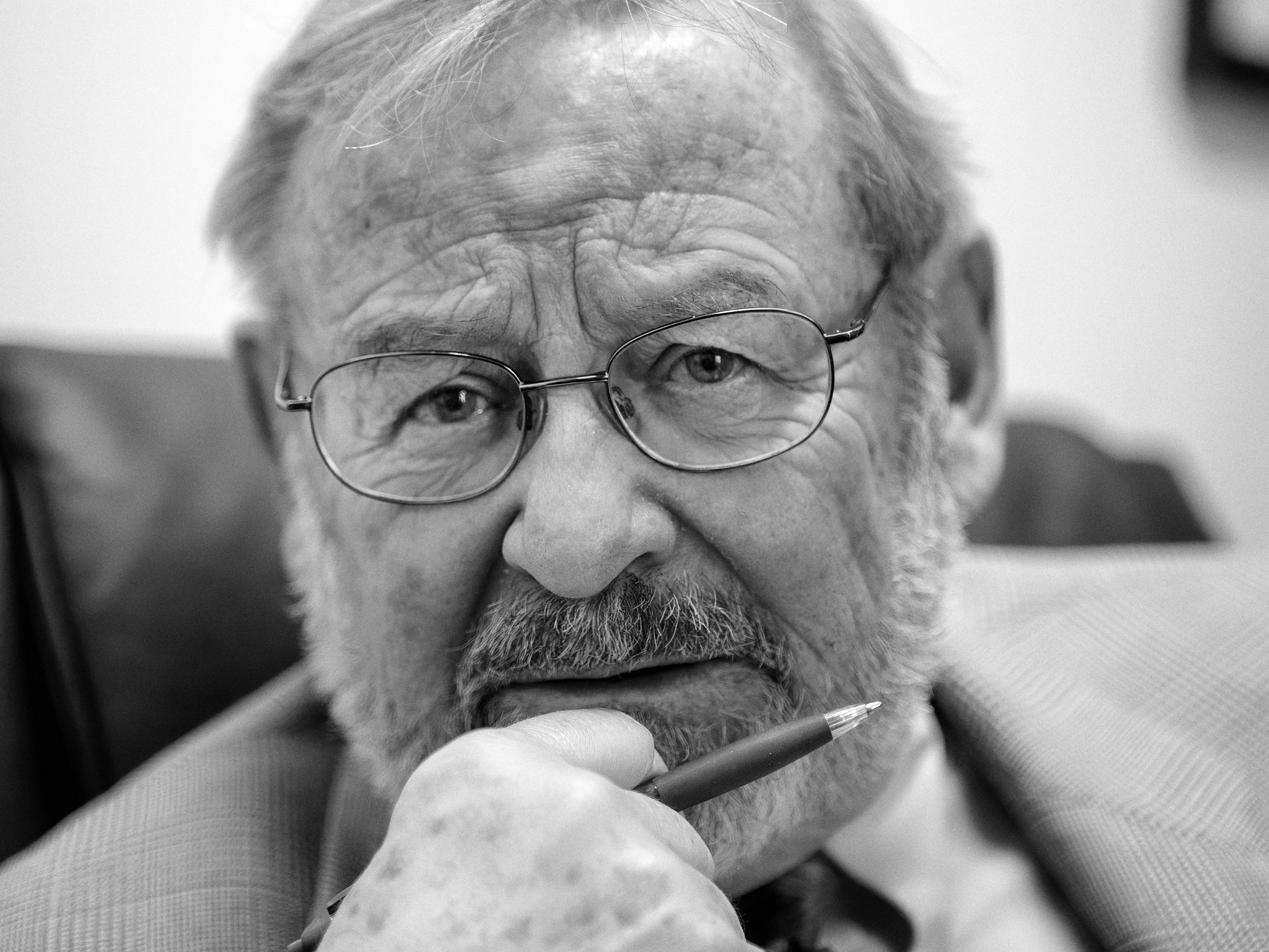
Carl Nolte in 2008

Carlos William Nolte (born August 21, 1933) is an American journalist. Until his retirement in 2026, he wrote the "Native Son" column in the San Francisco Chronicle.

== Early life and education ==
Nolte was born and raised in San Francisco; on his father's side, he is a fourth-generation San Franciscan. His father was a night watchman, and he was raised in the working-class Potrero Hill neighborhood. He attended St. Peter's High School and City College of San Francisco, and earned a bachelor's degree from the University of San Francisco. He then served in the United States Army on active duty in Korea and later served in the Army Reserve. In his 60s, on a fellowship from the San Francisco Chronicle, he studied at the University of California, Berkeley.

== Career ==
Nolte worked in the University of San Francisco's communication department, then was hired by the San Francisco Chronicle on June 13, 1961 as a copy editor. He was both a writer and an editor and in 2009 became a columnist, writing the weekly Native Son column. While a reporter for the Chronicle in the early 2000s, he was embedded with the United States Army as a war correspondent in the Gulf War. Topics of his column columns have included the Liberty ship SS Jeremiah O'Brien; he has served as president of National Liberty Ship Memorial, the group that restored it, and was on the crew when it sailed to Europe as part of the D-Day anniversary. He also served on the board of the San Francisco Maritime National Park Association from 1995.

Nolte was a long-time part-time teacher of journalism at San Francisco State College, now San Francisco State University. He retired from the Chronicle on June 13, 2026 at age 92, on the 65th anniversary of his hiring and after 17 years writing the Native Son column.

== Awards ==
Nolte received a Lifetime Achievement Award from the Society of Professional Journalists in 1986 and the President's Medal for Public Service of the University of San Francisco in 2000. In 2007, he received the Oscar Lewis Award of the Book Club of California for writing on western history. In 2010, he was awarded the Maritime Heritage Award by the San Francisco Maritime National Park Association. In 2012, he was given an Award of Merit by the San Francisco Museum and Historical Society. He has been awarded honorary degrees by the California Maritime Academy (now the Cal Poly Maritime Academy) and the University of San Francisco.

== Personal life ==
Nolte is married to Darlene Plumtree, referred to in his columns as "the Sailor Girl"; they live in Bernal Heights.

== Bibliography ==
- Nolte, Carl. The San Francisco Century: A City Rises from the Ruins of the 1906 Earthquake and Fire. San Francisco: San Francisco Chronicle, 2005. ISBN 0976088088
- Nolte, Carl. USS Pampanito: A Submarine and Her Crew. San Francisco: San Francisco Maritime National Park Association, 2001. ISBN 0971455007
- Sausalito Historical Society with contributions by Carl Nolte. Sausalito. Mount Pleasant: Arcadia Publishing, 2005. ISBN 0738530360
