= Statue of Christopher Columbus (Newport, Rhode Island) =

Statue in Newport, Rhode Island, United States

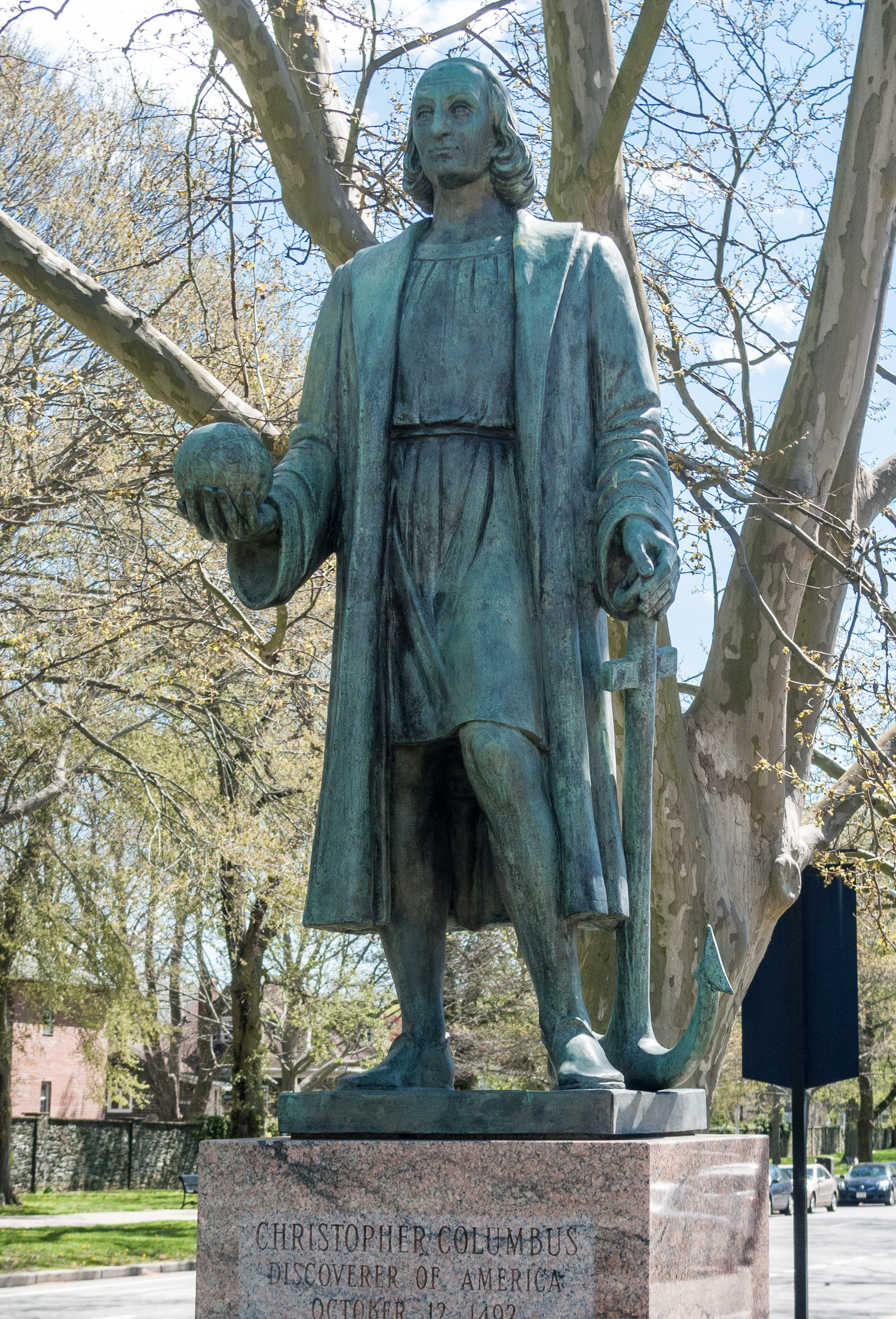
- The statue in 2017
- Subject: Christopher Columbus
- Location: Newport, Rhode Island, U.S.; 41°29′01″N 71°18′29″W

A statue of Christopher Columbus is installed in Newport, Rhode Island, United States.

== History ==
=== Formation of Committee ===
In 1932, a committee was formed to explore the idea of erecting a statue of Christopher Columbus in Newport as a gift from all the people of Italian heritage in the community. It appears that this committee grew out of the Italian Brotherhood Benefit Society of Newport, which had been incorporated by the General Assembly by an act passed on Feb. 5, 1897.

The statue was to be erected to commemorate the contributions made by the Italian explorer. Donations were solicited from people of Italian heritage, but funds from non-Italians were also welcome. Due to the economic crisis of the 1930s and the unstable international situation into the 1940s, the committee's activities were suspended until a more opportune time. The money that had been collected was put into a savings account and then invested in U.S. Defense Bonds in the name of the committee.

Early in the 1950s, the plan was reactivated, and each of the three United Italian Societies was asked to select four members each to serve on the Columbus Monument Committee. By that time, the Sons of Italy, Lodge Progresso e Civilita No. 391 (founded in 1941), later called the Forum Lodge Sons of Italy No. 391, and the Sons of Italy, St. Catherine of Siena Lodge, had joined the Italian Brotherhood Benefit Society in the endeavor. The monument committee announced its plans at a meeting at the end of January 1953 after working quietly for several years.

At some point, this committee commissioned the world-renowned Fonderia Artistica Ferdinando Marinelli in Florence, Italy, to create the statue. Marinelli was the cousin of Pasquale Russo, father of Gabriel D. Russo, and Donato F. D’Andrea, who was president of the Italian Brotherhood Benefit Society. Marinelli, born in 1887 near Perugia, established his own foundry in Florence in 1905. His foundry specialized in bronzes by contemporary sculptors as well as meeting the high demand for art-quality replicas of ancient and Renaissance masterpieces. The original was sculpted by Giovanni Cappelletti.

The foundry was unable to provide records of the transaction because it had lost all of its records of previous works during the Florence flood of 1966.

When the statue was actually ordered is unknown; however, in January 1953, the monument committee received a scale model of the Columbus statue. A photograph in The Newport Daily News on Jan. 30, 1953, shows Gabriel D. Russo with the model. It remains in the family today. The committee also discussed various locations for the statue's placement and decided on its present location at the intersection of Memorial Boulevard and Bellevue Avenue.

=== Creation of statue ===
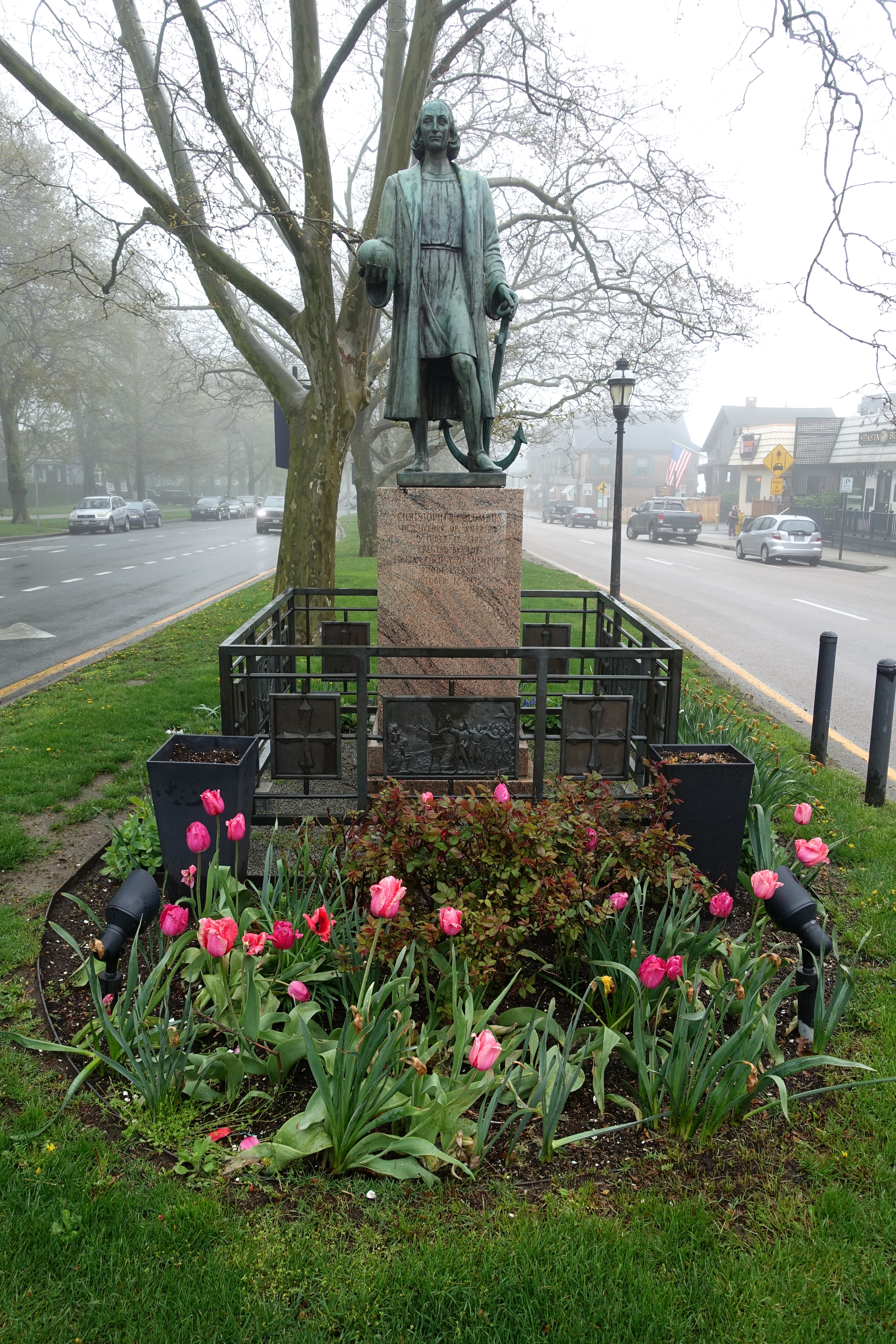
The statue in 2017

What the foundry wrought was a 5-foot, 8-inch life-size likeness of the explorer in bronze weighing 700 pounds, a sculptured bronze fence with relief panels of crosses and panels depicting Columbus’ ships, the Nina, the Pinta and the Santa Maria, as well as a panel showing him greeting the Indians upon his arrival, also weighing 700 pounds. The work also included a 1,300-pound base consisting of four marble outer wall slabs, one with an inscription, “Christopher Columbus, Discoverer of America, October 12, 1492, Erected by the Italian community of Newport, Rhode Island, October 12, 1953,” and a top slab to be assembled here. The name of the artist who created the prototype is on the statue; it reads “Modello (model or prototype), G. Cappelletti.”

At that time in 1953, the destroyer tender USS Cascade (AD-16) was on a four-month duty in the Mediterranean to support destroyers there; she was there from Feb. 21, 1953, to June 10, 1953. She had been recommissioned on April 5, 1951, and was based in Newport as tender for the many destroyers that were homeported here. While in the Mediterranean, the Cascade also distributed clothing that had been donated by Newport residents to the needy. The Columbus Monument Committee asked the Navy for its assistance. Through the office of Adm. William Fechtler, chief of naval operations, the Navy agreed to transport the statue and its accessories aboard the Cascade to Newport. The three local Italian societies incurred all expenses for the transport. The Florentine foundry shipped seven crates holding the statue, base and fence to Livorno, Italy, a port city on the Liguria Sea southeast of Genoa, and sent word to the Cascade in La Spezia, Italy, about 75 miles from Livorno. The commanding officer, Capt. Rob Roy McGregor, thought it would be easier to bring the statue to La Spezia than for the ship to go to Livorno, so the statue was brought to La Spezia. On the day of departure, there was a four-hour delay because Italian customs refused to load the statue crates because they did not have the proper clearance.

On June 19, 1953, Gabriel D. Russo was notified that the statue would arrive at Melville two days later. That day, Russo, his father, Pasquale, Gabe's two sons Paul, 10, and Bryan, 5, Donato F. D’Andrea, Enrico Cassese, Michael DeRensis, Mrs. Augustin Bucci and truck driver Stephen Toppa witnessed the unloading of the crates. Following the unloading, the two young boys were taken on a tour of the Cascade. Initially, the crates were taken to the MCM truck warehouse on Chapel Street. Later, the crates were moved to Alfredo Sciarotta, silversmith and metalworker, for assembly.

On Columbus Day 1953, the statute was finally installed.

=== Damage and restoration ===
In 1958, an auto accident seriously damaged the bronze fence, and it was placed into storage, where it was lost for many years.

In 2004 the city of Newport asked Newmans Ltd to restore the bronze statue of Columbus, which had been missing the fencing/surround for nearly years. Fortunately, Mayor Richard Sardella located the surround's fragments in the back of a construction company's storehouse under an old fire escape covered with years of dirt.

Using historical images kept by a member of the Italian American Society, the restoration company repaired or replaced the missing stone and bronze parts and reassembled the surround. The City of Newport's Parks Department helped to replace the surround, and strategically placed bollards between the monuments and the oncoming traffic. Since then, the bollards have had to be replaced twice. The statue and its surround remain unscathed.

=== Controversy ===
In 2020, Newport Mayor Jamie Bova indicated that she would be "very open" to removing the statue, noting that there are better Italians to celebrate.

== See also ==
- List of monuments and memorials to Christopher Columbus
