= USS Pampanito =

US Navy WW II submarine, now a museum ship

USS Pampanito (SS-383)
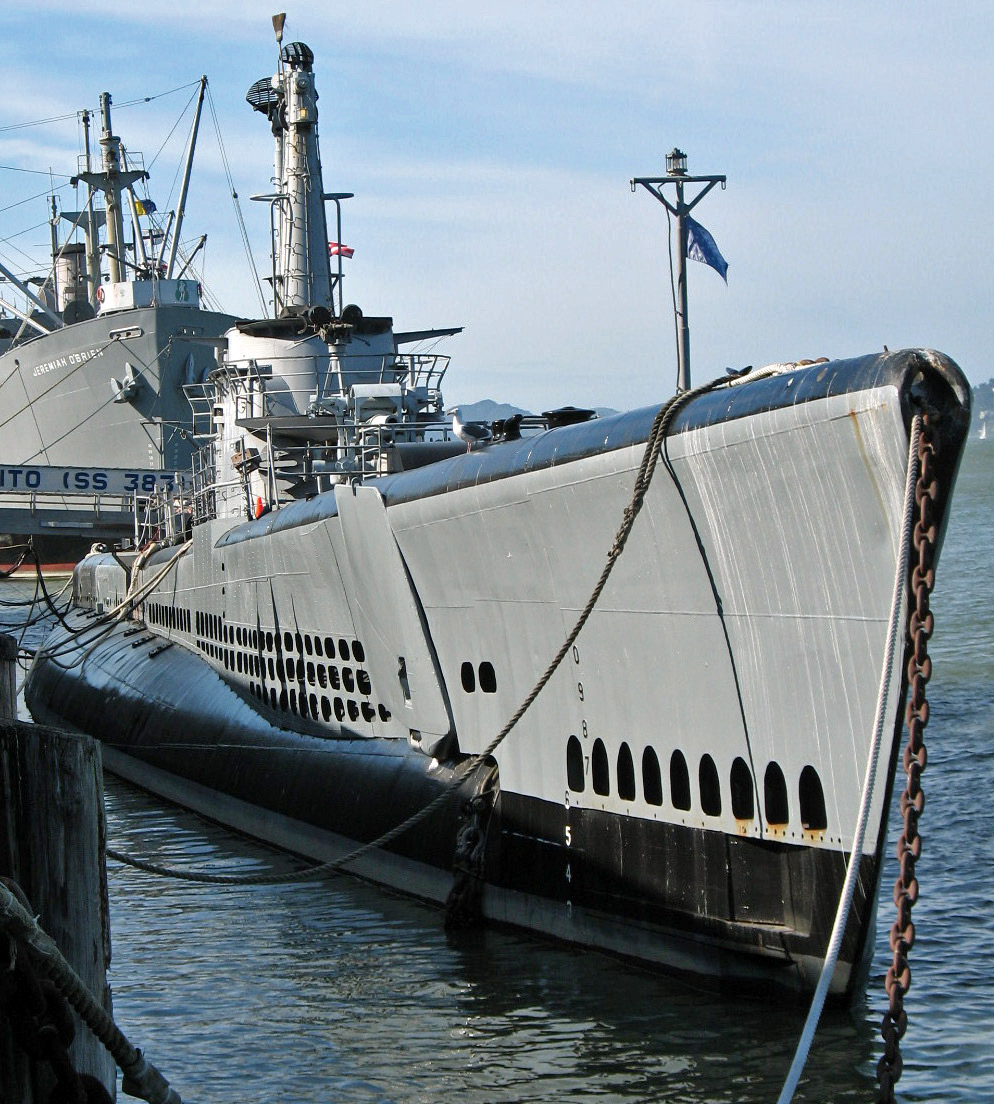
- USS Pampanito, with SS Jeremiah O'Brien moored astern in March 2008

History

United States
- Name: Pampanito
- Namesake: Pompano
- Builder: Portsmouth Naval Shipyard, Kittery, Maine
- Laid down: 15 March 1943
- Launched: 12 July 1943
- Sponsored by: Mrs. James Wolfender
- Commissioned: 6 November 1943
- Decommissioned: 15 December 1945
- Reclassified: AGSS-383, 6 November 1962
- Stricken: 20 December 1971
- Status: Museum ship in San Francisco since 21 November 1975

General characteristics
- Class & type: Balao-class diesel-electric submarine
- Displacement: 1,526 long tons (1,550 t) surfaced; 2,391 long tons (2,429 t) submerged
- Length: 311 ft 6 in (94.95 m)
- Beam: 27 ft 3 in (8.31 m)
- Draft: 16 ft 10 in (5.13 m) maximum
- Propulsion: 4 × Fairbanks-Morse Model 38D8-⅛ 10-cylinder opposed piston diesel engines driving electrical generators; 2 × 126-cell Sargo batteries; 4 × high-speed Elliott electric motors with reduction gears; two propellers; 5,400 shp (4.0 MW) surfaced; 2,740 shp (2.0 MW) submerged
- Speed: 20.25 knots (37.50 km/h; 23.30 mph) surfaced; 8.75 knots (16.21 km/h; 10.07 mph) submerged
- Range: 11,000 nautical miles (20,000 km; 13,000 mi) surfaced at 10 knots (19 km/h; 12 mph)
- Endurance: 48 hours at 2 knots (3.7 km/h; 2.3 mph) submerged; 75 days on patrol
- Test depth: 400 ft (120 m)
- Complement: 10 officers, 70–71 enlisted
- Armament: 10 × 21-inch (533 mm) torpedo tubes; 6 forward, 4 aft; 24 torpedoes; 1 × 4-inch (102 mm) / 50 caliber deck gun; Bofors 40 mm and Oerlikon 20 mm cannon
- USS Pampanito
- U.S. National Register of Historic Places
- U.S. National Historic Landmark
- Location within California Location within the United States
- Location: Fisherman's Wharf-Pier 45, San Francisco
- Coordinates: 37°48′36″N 122°24′59″W
- Website: www.maritime.org/pamphome.htm
- NRHP reference No.: 86000089

Significant dates
- Added to NRHP: 14 January 1986
- Designated NHL: 14 January 1986

USS Pampanito (SS-383/AGSS-383) is a Balao-class submarine built for the United States Navy during World War II; it is the third U.S. Navy vessel named for the pompano fish. She completed six war patrols from 1944 to 1945 and served as a United States Naval Reserve training ship from 1960 to 1971. She is now a National Historic Landmark, preserved as a memorial and museum ship in the San Francisco Maritime National Park Association located at Fisherman's Wharf in San Francisco, California.

== Construction and commissioning ==
Pampanito's keel was laid down by the Portsmouth Navy Yard in Kittery, Maine, on 15 March 1943. She was launched on 12 July 1943, sponsored by Mrs. Violet Wolfenden, and commissioned on 6 November 1943.

== World War II ==
After shakedown off New London, Connecticut, Pampanito transited the Panama Canal and arrived at Pearl Harbor, Hawaii, on 14 February 1944.

=== First patrol, March–May 1944 ===
Pampanito's first war patrol, from 15 March to 2 May, was conducted in the southwest approaches to Saipan and Guam. She served on lifeguard duty south of Yap, then scored two torpedo hits on a destroyer before sailing for Midway Island and Pearl Harbor for refit and repairs to a hull badly damaged by depth charges.

=== Second patrol, June–July 1944 ===
Pampanito's second war patrol, from 3 June to 23 July, took place off Kyūshū, Shikoku, and Honshū. On 23 June, a submerged Japanese submarine fired two torpedoes, just missing Pampanito. On 6 July, Pampanito damaged a Japanese gunboat, and 11 days later headed for Midway Island.

=== Third patrol, August–September 1944 ===
Pampanito's third war patrol, from 17 August to 28 September, a wolfpack operation with submarines Growler and Sealion, was conducted in the South China Sea. On 12 September, she sank the 9,419-ton SS Rakuyō Maru, which was transporting 1,350 British and Australian prisoners of war (POWs), also the 5,135-ton tanker Zuihō Maru, and she damaged a third ship. The Japanese survivors were rescued by an escort vessel, leaving POWs in the water with rafts and some abandoned boats. A total of 1,159 POWs died, of whom some 350 in lifeboats were bombarded and killed by a Japanese naval vessel the next day when they were rowing towards land. On 15 September, Pampanito moved back to the area of the original attack and found men clinging to makeshift rafts. As the sub moved closer, the men were heard to be shouting in English. Pampanito was able to pick up 73 British and Australian survivors and called in three other subs, Sealion, Barb, and Queenfish, to assist with the rescue. She then set course for Saipan, disembarked the survivors, and continued on to Pearl Harbor.

=== Fourth patrol, October–December 1944 ===
Pampanito's fourth war patrol, from 28 October to 30 December, took place off Formosa and the coast of southeastern China with Sea Cat, Pipefish, and Searaven. Sinking the 1,200-ton cargo ship Shinko Maru Number One, 19 November, she damaged a second ship before putting into Fremantle for refit.

=== Fifth patrol, January–February 1945 ===
Pampanito's fifth war patrol in the Gulf of Siam, from 23 January to 12 February 1945, with Guavina, was highlighted by two sinkings, the 6,968-ton cargo ship Engen Maru 6 February and the 3,520-ton passenger-cargo ship Eifuku Maru on 8 February.

=== Sixth patrol ===
Refitted at Subic Bay, Pampanito returned to the Gulf of Siam for her sixth war patrol. Operating with Caiman, Sealion, and Mingo, she sighted only one target before sailing for Pearl Harbor.

== 1945–1971 ==
From Pearl Harbor, the ship proceeded to San Francisco for overhaul, departing for Pearl Harbor again 1 August. With the end of the war, she was ordered to return to San Francisco. She was decommissioned at Mare Island on 15 December 1945, and remained in reserve until April 1960, when she was assigned to Naval Reserve Training at Mare Island Naval Shipyard. Reclassified AGSS-383, on 6 November 1962, she served as a Naval Reserve Training ship at Vallejo, California, until she was stricken from the Navy Register on 20 December 1971.

Pampanito earned six battle stars for World War II service.

== Museum ship ==
Pampanito was turned into a memorial and museum at San Francisco on 21 November 1975, transferred to the Maritime Park Association (formerly the National Maritime Museum Association) on 20 May 1976, and opened to the public on 15 March 1982.

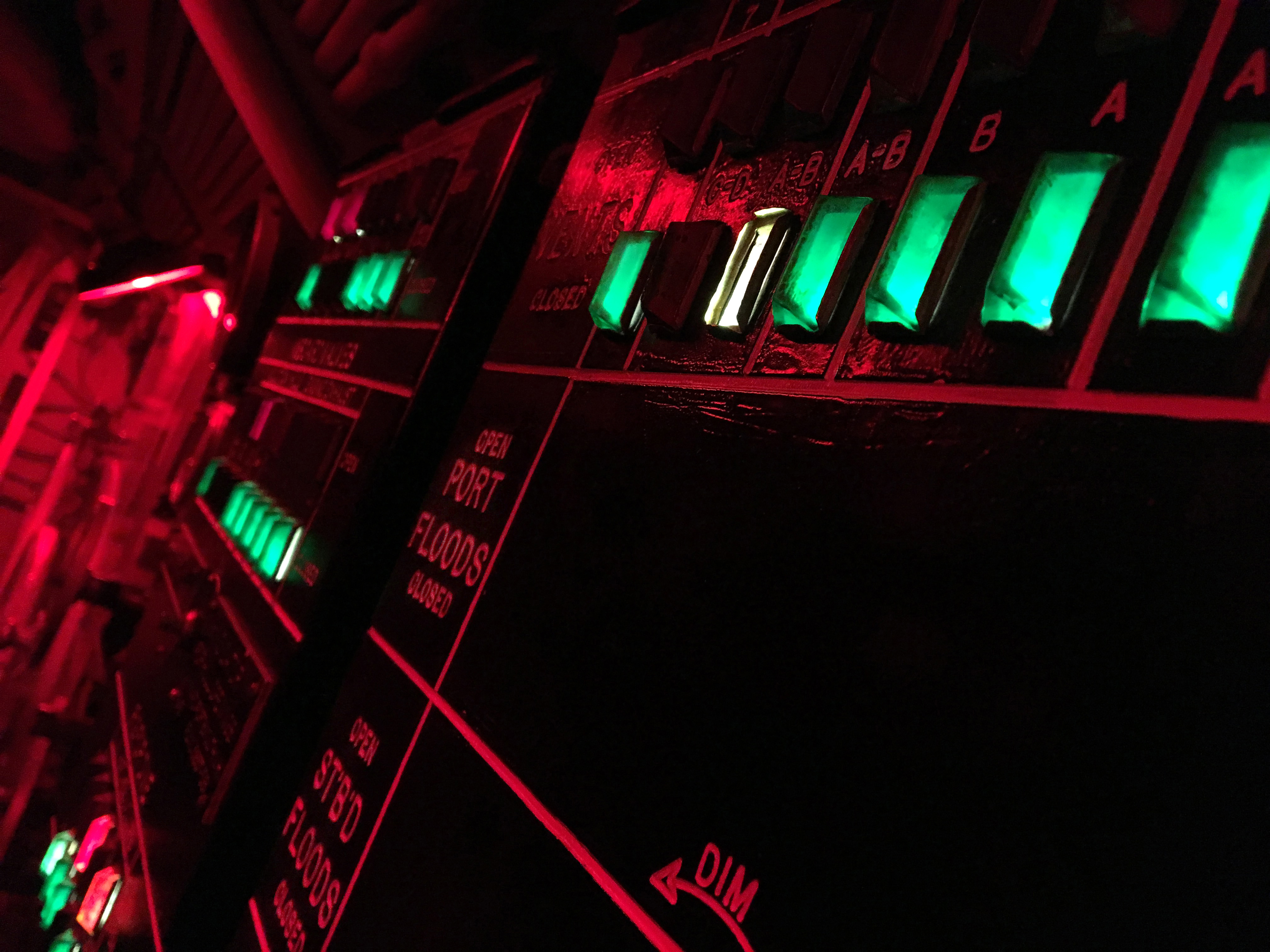
Pampanito Port Floods Panel

In 1986, Pampanito was listed on the National Register of Historic Places and declared to be a National Historic Landmark.

She is now owned and operated by the San Francisco Maritime National Park Association and is moored at Pier 45 in San Francisco's Fisherman's Wharf area, where she is open for visiting.

The USS PAMPANITO Amateur Radio Club brings the radio room to life on the second and fourth Saturdays of each month using the callsign NJ6VT – NJVT was the boat's call sign during WWII. Ham radio operators may contact the boat on 7.260 and 14.260 MHz using voice, and on other frequencies using Morse code.

She flies a broom from her mast, indicating a clean sweep, a successful patrol that "swept the enemy from the seas. In total, she sank six Japanese ships and damaged four others with a total of more than 27,000 tons of enemy shipping sunk.

Pampanito has completed four maintenance dry dockings since becoming a memorial and museum. "The Pampanito still has several working parts, including one torpedo tube, the periscope, engines, galley, and ice-cream maker." The museum runs educational programs including one that allows organized groups of children and adults to sleep overnight in the submarine's 48 bunk beds.

The ship was closed to the public and moved to a dry dock on 23 September 2016 and returned from Bay Ship and Yacht in Alameda, California, on 14 November 2016, and is currently open to the public.

Pampanito and the Liberty ship SS Jeremiah O'Brien were threatened by a four-alarm fire on 23 May 2020, but were saved by local firefighters.

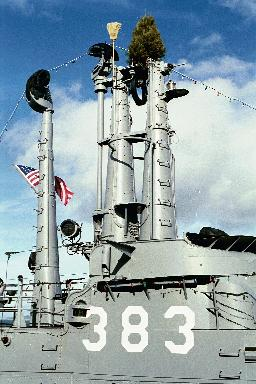
Masts and conning tower, with broom and tree, in March 2003

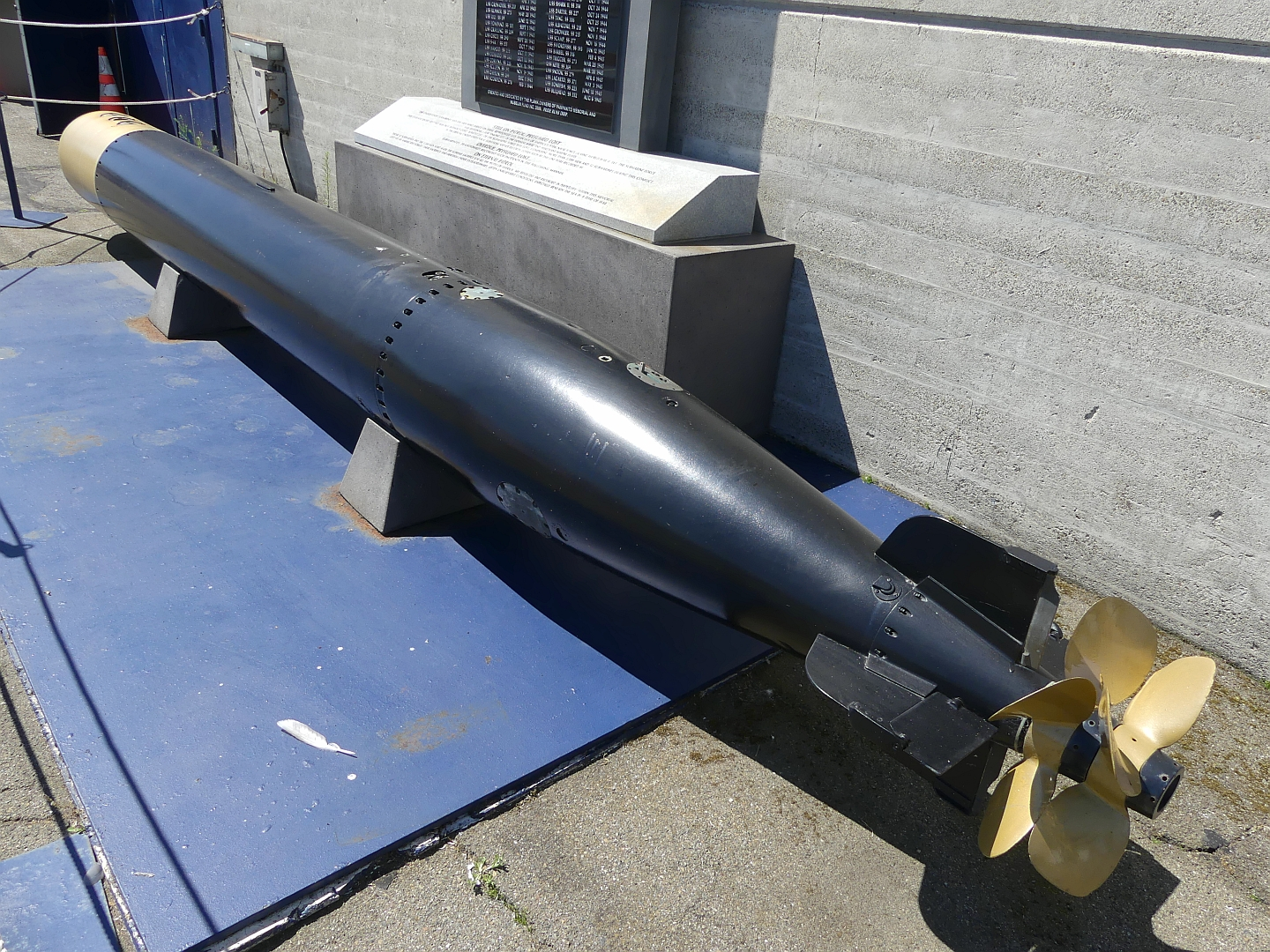
Mark 14 torpedo displayed in front of USS Pampanito

== In film ==
Pampanito played the fictional USS Stingray (SS-161) in the 1996 comedy film Down Periscope. Kelsey Grammer stars as the Stingray's commanding officer, Lieutenant Commander Thomas Dodge, and the film is set on the United States East Coast in the harbors at Charleston, South Carolina, and Norfolk, Virginia. The action scenes use a combination of a special effects shooting miniature for the composited underwater scenes, older Pampanito color stock footage of her under power on the surface, then submerging, and newly shot footage of Pampanito moving under tow in San Francisco Bay while venturing past the Golden Gate Bridge. Fifty years have passed since she last navigated under the bridge.
