= Rob Roy McGregor (admiral) =

United States Navy officer (1907–2000)

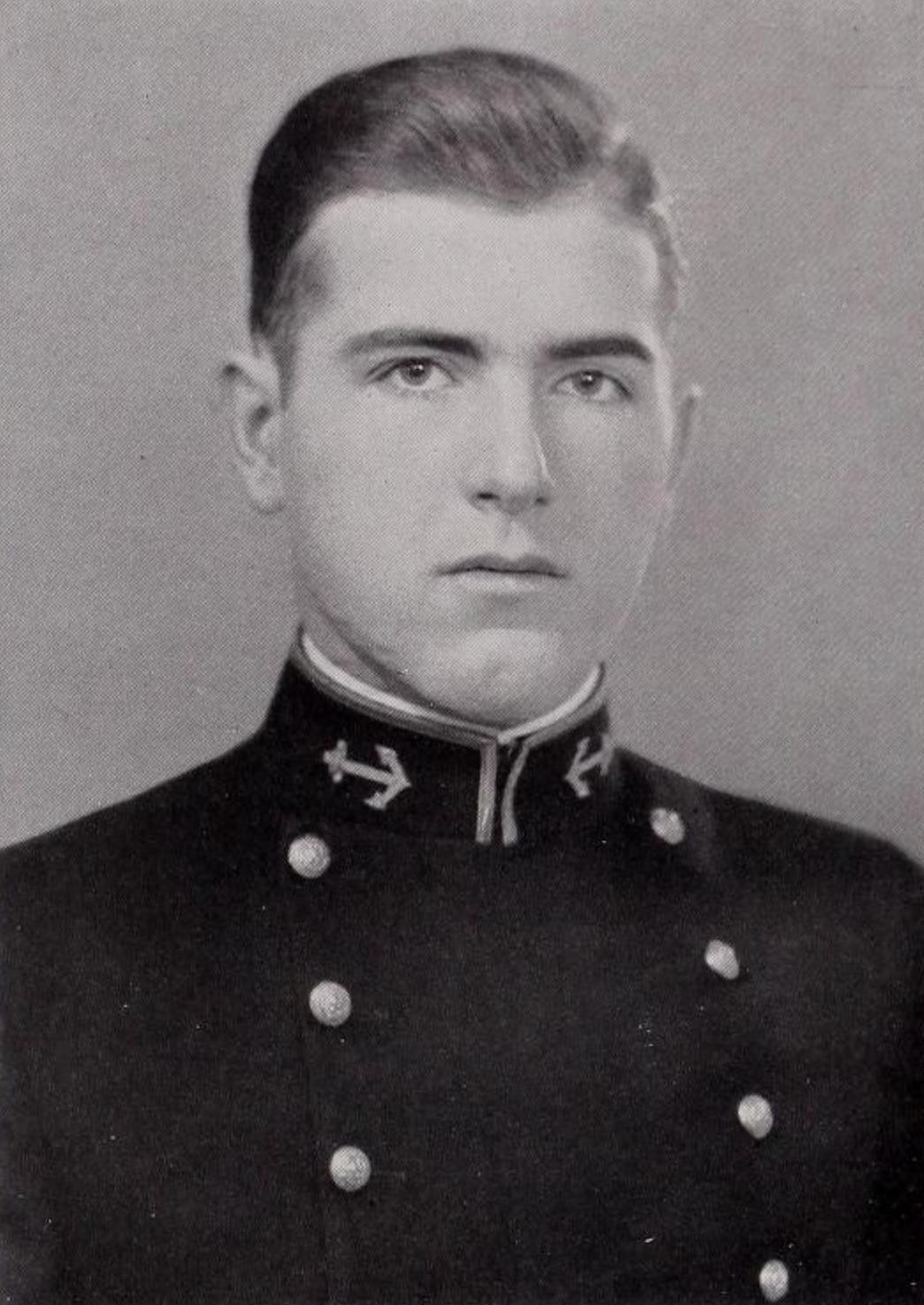
- Born: February 7, 1907; Seattle, Washington, U.S.
- Died: September 5, 2000 (aged 93); San Diego, California, U.S.
- Burial place: Fort Rosecrans National Cemetery
- Alma mater: United States Naval Academy
- Spouse: Mary Elizabeth Osborn (m. 1940)
- Children: 3
- Military career
- Allegiance: United States of America
- Branch: United States Navy
- Service years: 1929-1957
- Rank: Rear Admiral
- Service number: 62649
- Commands: USS S-36 (SS-141); USS Grouper (SS-214); USS Sea Cat (SS-399); Submarine Division 202; Submarine Squadron Five; Submarine Squadron One; Destroyer Squadron Five; USS Cascade (AD-16)
- Conflicts: World War II
- Awards: Silver Star (3)

Robert Roy McGregor (7 February 1907 – 5 September 2000), was an American submarine commander during World War II who reached the rank of rear admiral in the United States Navy. After his retirement, McGregor worked as the technical advisor on the film Run Silent, Run Deep.

== Early life ==
Robert Roy McGregor was born in Seattle, Washington, on 7 February 1907, son of Frank McGregor and Lydia (née Schmidt). His father was a navy gunner, serving on USS Culgoa and being promoted to chief gunner. McGregor was accepted to the United States Naval Academy on 16 June 1925. While attending the Naval Academy, Midshipman McGregor participated in wrestling and lacrosse. Upon graduating from Annapolis in 1929, he was commissioned as an ensign in the United States Navy.

== Early naval career ==
Upon receiving his commission, Ensign McGregor was assigned to the USS Arkansas (BB-33). After finishing his duty on the Arkansas, he was assigned to the Naval Submarine Base New London for instruction on submarines. While attending submarine school at New London, McGregor and two other officers were injured when a torpedo motor they were working on exploded. McGregor was promoted to Lieutenant Junior Grade in June 1932 and upon completion of submarine school was assigned to the USS S-14 (SS-119). While serving aboard the S-14, McGregor became qualified on submarines. In November 1934, he was transferred from S-14 to USS S-17 (SS-122). In 1935 he was transferred to USS R-4 (SS-81). While assigned to R-4, he became qualified to command submarines and was transferred to the Third Naval District in New York where he was promoted to the rank of lieutenant. In January 1938 Lieutenant McGregor was assigned to USS S-20 (SS-125) before taking command of his first submarine, USS S-36 (SS-141), on 28 March. S-36 was assigned to the United States Asiatic Fleet and stationed at Naval Base Cavite. McGregor married Mary Elizabeth Osborn at Sterberg Chapel in Manila on 20 January 1940. Her late father was a commander in the USN Construction Corps and had been stationed at the New York Navy Yard.

== World War II ==
=== Grouper second patrol ===
The summer following the attack on Pearl Harbor, LCDR McGregor took command of USS Grouper (SS-214). On 28 August 1942, he set off from Pearl Harbor on his first war patrol (the Grouper's second) to patrol the East China Sea. On 21 September, off the coast of Shanghai, McGregor made his first kill, sinking the Japanese transport Tone Maru.

Near Qing-bang, Dongji Islands, in the eastern Zhoushan Archipelago on 1 October Grouper fired on the Japanese transport Lisbon Maru which was, unknown to the Grouper, transporting about 1,800 prisoners of war. Three of Grouper's torpedoes missed, but the fourth one hit, "stopping the freighter dead in the water" Grouper fired two more torpedoes, one of which hit. When an enemy aircraft appeared and dropped depth charges on Grouper, it dived to escape.

The sinking resulted in deaths of more than 800 British prisoners. Grouper arrived in Midway on 21 October, credited with 12,000 tons of enemy freight sunk, for which McGregor was awarded the Silver Star for "conspicuous gallantry and intrepidity in action".

=== Grouper third patrol ===
Grouper was refitted at Midway and had an SJ radar installed. On 12 November, Grouper embarked for the Solomon Sea. On 17 December, McGregor sighted two large camouflaged freighters. He fired six torpedoes, damaging one freighter, and sinking the 8,000 ton Bandoeng Maru. McGregor and his crew finished their patrol, arriving in Brisbane on 31 December 1942.

=== Grouper fourth patrol ===
After refitting, Grouper left Brisbane on 21 January 1943, to patrol north of the Solomon Islands. Grouper made contact with two convoys. Attacking the first convoy, it fired a number of torpedoes, all of which missed. The second convoy was made up of more than 20 destroyers. McGregor waited until the last destroyers were passing, but an Allied air raid on the convoy caused his target to alter course, ruining his chance to attack. On 9 February, McGregor received orders to rescue 1LT Lawrence R. McKulla, a pilot who had been shot down 26 January and was stranded on Rengi Island. Grouper continued its patrol, gathering intelligence on Japanese radar stations, and arrived in Brisbane on 18 March. McGregor's commanding officer James Fife Jr. was known for being a cold and unforgiving leader. "Fife's patrol report endorsements were long, detailed, professional and often harsh. Two skippers who felt the lash were Dick Lake in Albacore and Rob Roy McGregor in Grouper" Fife's report on Grouper's fourth war patrol was particularly harsh, claiming McGregor had not been aggressive enough, causing him to miss a golden opportunity. McGregor's war patrol was officially unsuccessful, as a result, McGregor was relieved of command. He was subsequently sent to serve on the staff of Submarine Squadrons Eight and Six before being assigned to new construction. It was not until 16 May 1944, with the commissioning of USS Sea Cat (SS-399), that McGregor was given another chance at commanding a submarine. The Navy seemingly took back its punitive action against McGregor, as in March 1945 he was awarded a second Silver Star for his second patrol commanding Grouper.

=== Sea Cat first patrol ===
CDR McGregor took command of Sea Cat upon her commissioning at Portsmouth Navy Yard on 16 May 1944. After Sea Cat's shakedown and trials, she sailed to Pearl Harbor, arriving 3 October. On 28 October Sea Cat got underway, heading to patrol the Gulf of Tonkin. On 3 December, McGregor fired on a convoy. He was credited with sinking one ship and damaging a second, adding 15,000 tons to his record. Sea Cat finished her patrol and returned to Guam on 27 December. McGregor was awarded his third silver star for the successful war patrol. This was McGregor's last war patrol. After the war he was credited with a total of 35,400 tons sunk and an additional 8,000 tons damaged.

=== End of the war ===
After completing his war patrol in command of Sea Cat, McGregor was promoted to division commander, under Lewis Smith Parks. After the surrender of Japan was announced, Admiral Chester W. Nimitz invited Admiral Charles A. Lockwood to attend the ceremony. Lockwood in turn ordered a dozen submarines to sail to Tokyo to be present for the ceremony. After arriving in Tokyo Bay, Parks took control of the Japanese submarine base at Yokosuka. Parks, with Robert McGregor and Barney McMahon, went into the city of Tokyo to visit the Tokyo Imperial Palace before Nimitz arrived. They were the first US military forces to set foot inside of Tokyo.

== Later career ==
In May 1952, McGregor took command of the destroyer tender USS Cascade (AD-16). His final command was of Destroyer Squadron 5 in the Mediterranean.

As a favor to the Italian societies of Newport, and with approval from the Navy, McGregor delivered a life sized bronze statue of Christopher Columbus to Newport from La Spezia, Italy. To have the statue released, McGregor had to personally settle a dispute with an Italian customs official. It was delivered to Newport on 22 June 1953.

== Personal life and death ==
McGregor married Mary Osborn in 1940. They had three children: Rob Roy Junior, Allison Gay and Mary Cameron.

Rear Admiral McGregor retired to Coronado, California in February 1957, after 28 years of naval service. He ran a small business in San Diego and also worked as a technical advisor on the Hollywood movie, Run Silent, Run Deep, in which he gave the scriptwriter and actors accurate details of the speech and appearance of submariners and their weaponry.
