= USS Searaven =

Submarine of the United States

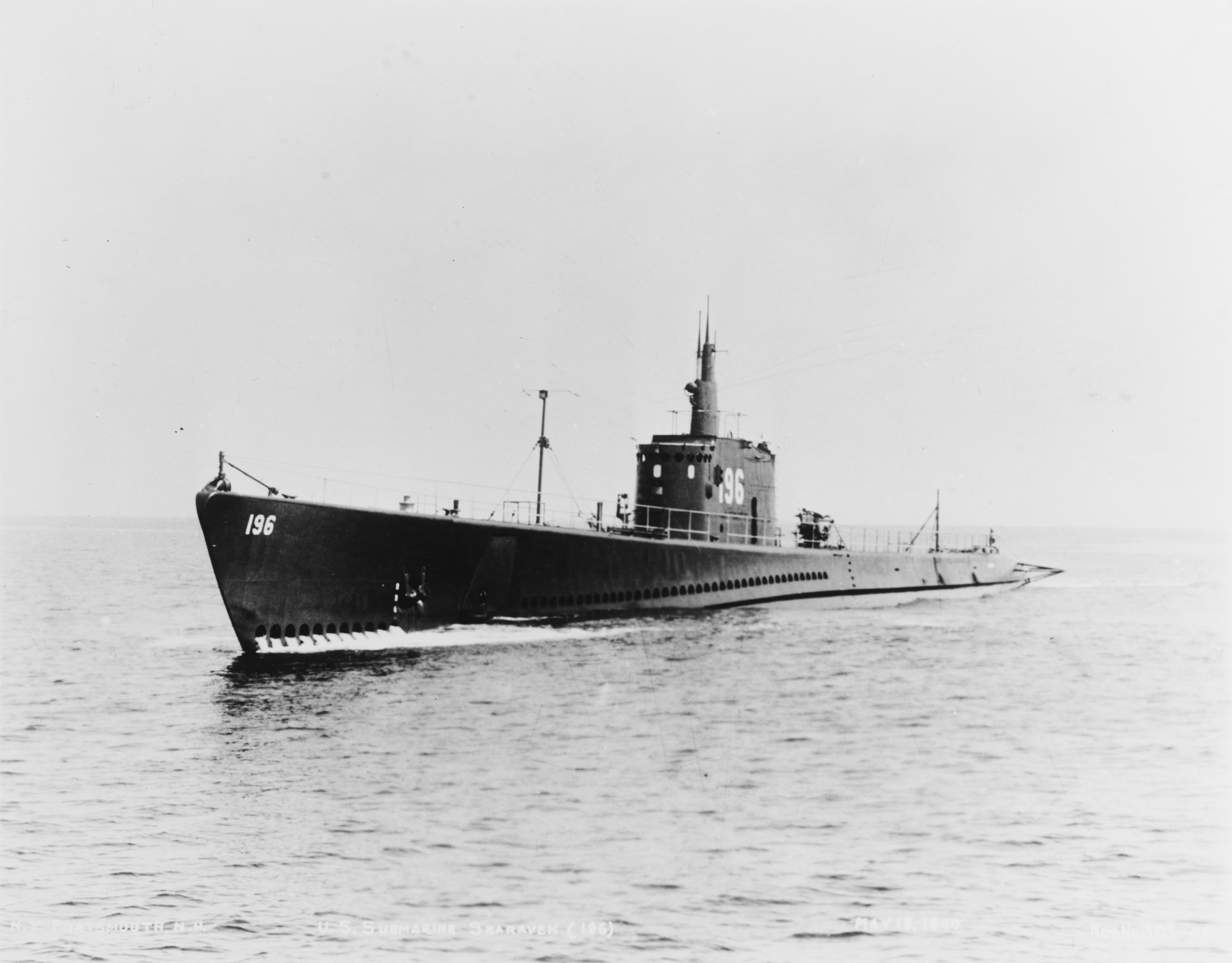
- USS Searaven during trials, 13 May 1940.

History

United States
- Name: Searaven
- Namesake: sea raven
- Builder: Portsmouth Naval Shipyard, Kittery, Maine
- Laid down: 9 August 1938
- Launched: 21 June 1939
- Commissioned: 2 October 1939
- Decommissioned: 11 December 1946
- Stricken: 21 October 1948
- Fate: Target for Operation Crossroads atomic bomb test, then sunk as a target off southern California on 11 September 1948

General characteristics
- Class & type: Sargo-class diesel-electric submarine
- Displacement: 1,450 long tons (1,470 t) standard, surfaced, 2,350 long tons (2,390 t) submerged
- Length: 310 ft 6 in (94.64 m)
- Beam: 26 ft 10 in (8.18 m)
- Draft: 16 ft 7 1/2 in (5.067 m)
- Propulsion: 4 × General Motors Model 16-248 V16 diesel engines driving electrical generators, 2 × 126-cell Sargo batteries, 4 × high-speed General Electric electric motors with reduction gears; two shafts, 5,400 shp (4.1 MW) surfaced, 2,740 shp (2.0 MW) submerged
- Speed: 21 knots (39 km/h) surfaced, 8.75 knots (16 km/h) submerged
- Range: 11,000 nmi (20,000 km; 13,000 mi) at 10 kn (19 km/h; 12 mph)
- Endurance: 48 hours at 2 knots (3.7 km/h) submerged
- Test depth: 250 ft (80 m)
- Complement: 5 officers, 54 enlisted
- Armament: 8 × 21 inch (533 mm) torpedo tubes; (four forward, four aft); 24 torpedoes; 1 × 3 in (76 mm)/50 deck gun; four machine guns

USS Searaven (SS-196), a Sargo-class submarine, was the only ship of the United States Navy to be named for the sea raven, a sculpin of the northern Atlantic coast of America.

== Construction and commissioning ==
Searaven′s keel was aid down on 9 August 1938 by the Portsmouth Navy Yard in Kittery, Maine. She was launched on 21 June 1939, sponsored by Mrs. Julianna B. Cole, wife of Cyrus W. Cole, Commandant of the Portsmouth Navy Yard, and commissioned on 2 October 1939, with Lieutenant Thomas G. Reamy in command.

== World War II ==
In the two years preceding the United States's entry into World War II, Searaven operated in Philippine waters conducting training and maneuvers. At the outbreak of war between the United States and the Japanese Empire, the submarine was at the Cavite Navy Yard in Manila Bay. During her first two war patrols in December 1941 and the spring of 1942, she ran supplies to the American and Filipino troops besieged on the Bataan Peninsula and Corregidor Island. In a night action in the Molucca Strait on 3 February 1942, Searaven engaged a Japanese destroyer with Mark 14 torpedoes. Two official sources conflict, regarding the results of this engagement. If confirmed it would have been Searaven's first kill of the war.

Searaven conducted her third war patrol in the vicinity of Timor Island of the Netherlands East Indies, from 2 April to 25 April 1942. On 18 April, she rescued 32 Royal Australian Air Force men from enemy-held Timor, an act for which two of her officers were awarded the Navy Cross. Five days later, fire broke out in her main power cubicle, immobilizing Searaven completely. Snapper assisted her into port in Australia.

Searaven's fourth war patrol was a quiet one and returning from her fifth patrol, she claimed 23,400 tons sunk and 6,853 damaged. This tally, however, went unconfirmed. She ended her fifth patrol on 24 November 1942 at Fremantle, Australia, where she underwent refit. On 18 December, she got underway from Fremantle, bound for the Banda Sea, Ceram Sea, and the Palau Islands. In the Banda Sea, she welcomed the New Year by loosing a spread of three torpedoes at the minelayer Itsukushima. Again, the sinking claimed by Searaven went unconfirmed. Two weeks later, on 14 January 1943, the submarine pumped four torpedoes into the freighter Siraha Maru and collected her first confirmed victory. On 10 February, she sailed into Pearl Harbor and, two days later, she set out for overhaul at Mare Island, California.

She completed overhaul on 7 May 1943 and returned to Pearl Harbor on 25 May. On 7 June, Searaven departed from Pearl Harbor for her seventh patrol, this time in the Mariana Islands area. During this patrol, she reconnoitered Marcus Island, but encountered no enemy shipping. She put into Midway Island on 29 July for refit.

Her eighth war patrol began at Midway on 23 August 1943. She plied the waters off the northeastern coast of Honshū, Japan, but found no enemy ship worth a torpedo. After a month and one-half at sea, the submarine made Pearl Harbor on 6 October.

A month later, she stood out for her ninth patrol. She patrolled the Eastern Caroline Islands and, for a three-day period, operated with a coordinated attack group ("wolfpack") of submarines which was used as part of the defensive screen for the Gilbert Islands operation. On 25 November, she got her second confirmed kill, sending the 10,052-ton tanker Toa Maru to the bottom with four torpedoes, then survived a depth charge attack from the Japanese destroyer Akigumo without damage. She sailed back into Pearl Harbor on 6 December.

Searaven's tenth war patrol, from 17 January to 3 March 1944, was occupied by photographic reconnaissance of Eniwetok Atoll and lifeguard duty for the air strikes on the Marshall Islands, Mariana Islands, and Truk. She was involved in two friendly fire incidents during the patrol. While she was on the surface near Engebi Island on 13 February, she sighted four U.S. Navy planes she mistook for Japanese aircraft and crash-dived. The planes mistook her for a Japanese submarine, and attacked her as she submerged. Searaven′s crew heard four depth charges detonate by the time she passed a depth of 80 feet (24 m). Off Eniwetok on 17 February, she submerged in accordance with instructions when she sighted an approaching U.S. Navy task force of battleships and destroyers, As the task force passed over her while she was at a depth of 200 feet (61 m), one of the destroyers dropped a depth charge targeting her. She suffered no damage or casualties in either incident. She rescued three airmen during her patrol, but put into Midway on 3 March 1944 with no additional sinkings to her credit.

On 26 March, Searaven embarked upon her 11th war patrol. Her assigned area was the southern islands of the Nanpō Islands, the Bonin Islands. She made two attacks during this patrol, claimed two more sinkings, but was officially credited with none.

After a complete overhaul at Pearl Harbor, Searaven set course for the Kuril Islands area. Twelve enemy vessels were sunk during this patrol. On 21 September 1944, in a night surface attack, the submarine torpedoed and sank an unescorted Japanese freighter, Rizan Maru which had dropped behind her convoy. On the night of 25 September, Searaven engaged two trawlers, four large sampans, and four 50-ton sampans. Searaven passed down the column of eight sampans and two trawlers, 250 yards (230 m) abeam, engaging from one to three at a time at practically point blank range. Those that did not sink on the first pass were given another dose of the same treatment until all were destroyed.

On 1 November 1944, Searaven sailed on her final war patrol as part of a coordinated attack group which also included the submarines Pampanito, Sea Cat, and Pipefish. Operating in the South China Sea, east of Hainan Island, the submarine closed out her combat career by sinking one Heinan Maru-class transport and an Omurosan Maru-type oiler. With combat ended, Searaven was assigned target and training duties for the remainder of the war.

== Post-War ==
Searaven was one of the target ships in the 1946 atomic bomb test, Operation Crossroads, at Bikini Atoll. She escaped the tests with negligible damage. The submarine was decommissioned on 11 December 1946, sunk as a target on 11 September 1948, and struck from the Naval Vessel Register on 21 October 1948.

== Awards ==
- Asiatic-Pacific Campaign Medal with 10 battle stars for World War II service
