= USS Grouper =

Gato-class submarine (1941 to 1968)

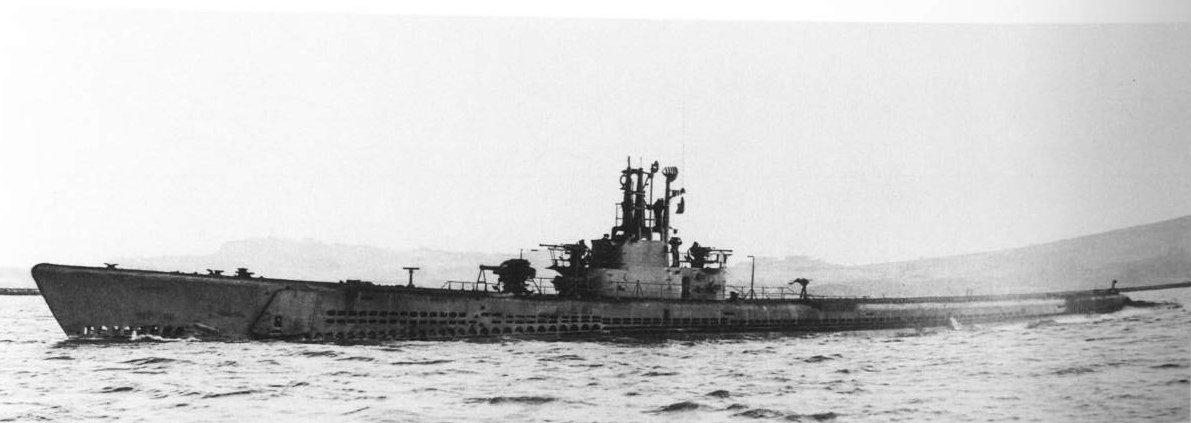
- Grouper off Mare Island 17 July 1945

History

United States
- Builder: Electric Boat Company, Groton, Connecticut
- Laid down: 28 December 1940
- Launched: 27 October 1941
- Sponsored by: Mrs. Albert F. Church
- Commissioned: 12 February 1942
- Decommissioned: 2 December 1968
- Stricken: 2 December 1968
- Honors and awards: 10 × battle stars; Navy E Ribbon
- Fate: Sold for scrap, 11 August 1970

General characteristics
- Class & type: Gato-class diesel-electric submarine
- Displacement: 1,525 long tons (1,549 t) surfaced; 2,424 long tons (2,463 t) submerged
- Length: 311 ft 9 in (95.02 m)
- Beam: 27 ft 3 in (8.31 m)
- Draft: 17 ft (5.2 m) maximum
- Propulsion: 4 × General Motors Model 16-248 V16 Diesel engines driving electric generators; 2 × 126-cell Sargo batteries; 4 × high-speed General Electric electric motors with reduction gears; two propellers; 5,400 shp (4.0 MW) surfaced; 2,740 shp (2.0 MW) submerged
- Speed: 21 knots (39 km/h) surfaced; 9 kn (17 km/h) submerged
- Range: 11,000 nautical miles (20,000 km) surfaced at 10 kn (19 km/h)
- Endurance: 48 hours at 2 kn (4 km/h) submerged; 75 days on patrol
- Test depth: 300 ft (90 m)
- Complement: 6 officers, 54 enlisted
- Armament: 10 × 21-inch (533 mm) torpedo tubes; 6 forward, 4 aft; 24 torpedoes; 1 × 3-inch (76 mm) / 50 caliber deck gun; Bofors 40 mm and Oerlikon 20 mm cannon

USS Grouper (SS/SSK/AGSS-214), a Gato-class submarine, was the only ship of the United States Navy to be named for the grouper.

== Construction and commissioning ==
Grouper was launched by the Electric Boat Company at Groton, Connecticut, on 27 October 1941, sponsored by Mrs. Albert F. Church, and commissioned at New London on 12 February 1942, with Lieutenant Commander C. E. Duke in command.

== 1942 ==
After shakedown in Long Island Sound, Grouper sailed for Pearl Harbor on 30 March 1942 to join the Pacific Submarine Force, which was to play havoc on Japanese shipping. Before departing for her first war patrol, Grouper was assigned to the submarine screen which ringed the area as the American and Japanese fleets clashed in the decisive Battle of Midway. Patrolling the fringe of the fighting on 4 June, Grouper sighted two burning enemy aircraft carriers, but could not close for attack because of heavy air cover. On that day, she was strafed by fighter planes and driven deep in a series of aircraft and destroyer attacks which saw over 170 depth charges and bombs dropped on the novice submarine.

The next day, as the battle still raged, Grouper crash-dived to avoid enemy bombers. She then put in at Midway for three days for fuel and provisions before sailing on her first war patrol on 12 June. She torpedoed and damaged two Japanese maru (merchant) ships before returning to Pearl Harbor on 30 July.

On her second patrol (28 August – 9 October), Grouper under the command of Rob Roy McGregor sank two freighters, Tone Maru on 21 September and Lisbon Maru on 1 October. It was later learned that Lisbon Maru was carrying 1800 British POWs from Hong Kong; over 800 died in the sinking.

On her third patrol (12 November – 31 December) to Brisbane, Australia, on 17 December, she encountered and sank Bandoeng Maru, a passenger-freighter headed for the Solomon Islands with troop reinforcements.

== 1943 ==
During her fourth war patrol (21 January – 18 March 1943), Grouper rescued an aviator who had been stranded on Rengi Island, near Rob Roy Island in the Solomons, for several days; she also located several key Japanese radar installations in the Solomon Islands. On 4 February 1943, she penetrated between the two columns of a Japanese convoy and had just achieved a firing solution on a destroyer at a range of 1,500 yards (1,372 m) when Allied aircraft arrived and began bombing the convoy, both prompting her target to make a radical course change that spoiled her attack and endangering Grouper herself. Japanese aircraft intervened, resulting in a large dogfight over Grouper's position. With the Japanese ships and aircraft on high alert, Grouper went deep and lost her opportunity to attack the convoy.

Grouper's next four patrols netted her no further kills, despite several determined attacks, but the patrols illustrated the varied tasks submarines took on during the war. In addition to her regular patrol duties, which harassed Japanese shipping and tied up valuable warships desperately needed by the enemy, Grouper landed 50 men and 3,000 lb (1,400 kg) of gear on New Britain to carry on guerrilla warfare; at the same time, she rescued an American aviator who had been stranded there almost three months.

On 30 July 1943, a United States Army Air Forces B-25 Mitchell bomber mistakenly attacked Grouper in the Coral Sea, 185 nautical miles (343 km; 213 mi) east of Rossel Island at 11°00′S 156°44′E. She crash-dived to a depth of 150 feet (46 m), but the B-25 dropped two depth charges which exploded as she passed a depth of 50 feet (15 m), inflicting enough damage that she was forced to terminate her patrol and head for Brisbane. She reached Brisbane on 3 August 1943 and went alongside the submarine tender USS Fulton (AS-11) for repairs.

At the conclusion of her eighth patrol, Grouper headed for the United States and overhaul, reaching San Francisco on 19 October 1943.

== 1944 ==
After returning to Pearl Harbor on 7 January 1944 for additional repairs, the veteran submarine sailed for her ninth war patrol on 22 May. This patrol netted Grouper what was to be her last kill of the war, Kumanoyama Maru, which she sank in a night surface attack on 24 June. Grouper's final three war patrols found a lack of targets; American submarines had done their job on Japanese shipping too well for Grouper's purposes. She stood lifeguard duty during several air strikes and rescued seven downed aviators during raids on the Palaus in September 1944.

== 1945–1949 ==
Returning to Pearl Harbor from her 12th and last war patrol on 26 April 1945, Grouper sailed the following day for San Francisco and overhaul. She returned to Pearl Harbor on 6 August, but V-J Day cancelled plans for another patrol, and on 9 September, Grouper, in company with Toro and Blackfish, sailed for New London. Four years of local operations and training exercises along the coast to Florida and in the Caribbean followed for Grouper. During this period, she chalked up two "firsts": in 1946 she became the first submarine to have a Combat Information Center installed, and the following year she effected the first discharge and recovery of men from a submerged and underway submarine.

== 1950–1957 ==
These operations ended 5 March 1950 as Grouper entered the Mare Island Naval Shipyard for conversion under project SCB 58 to the Navy's first "hunter-killer submarine". Her classification was changed to SSK-214 on 2 January 1951. With the addition of a snorkel and extensive sonar and radar facilities, Grouper emerged from the yard on 27 June 1951 to pioneer in research on the deadly submarine-versus-submarine warfare. For the next eight years, as a unit of Submarine Development Group 2, Grouper worked to develop and test concepts of hunter-killer antisubmarine warfare. In this duty, she ranged along the East Coast from Nova Scotia to Florida, as well as participating in Caribbean exercises. In 1953 and 1955, exercises took Grouper across the Atlantic to Rothesay, via Iceland. In the fall of 1957, she then participated in NATO maneuvers.

== 1958–1962 ==
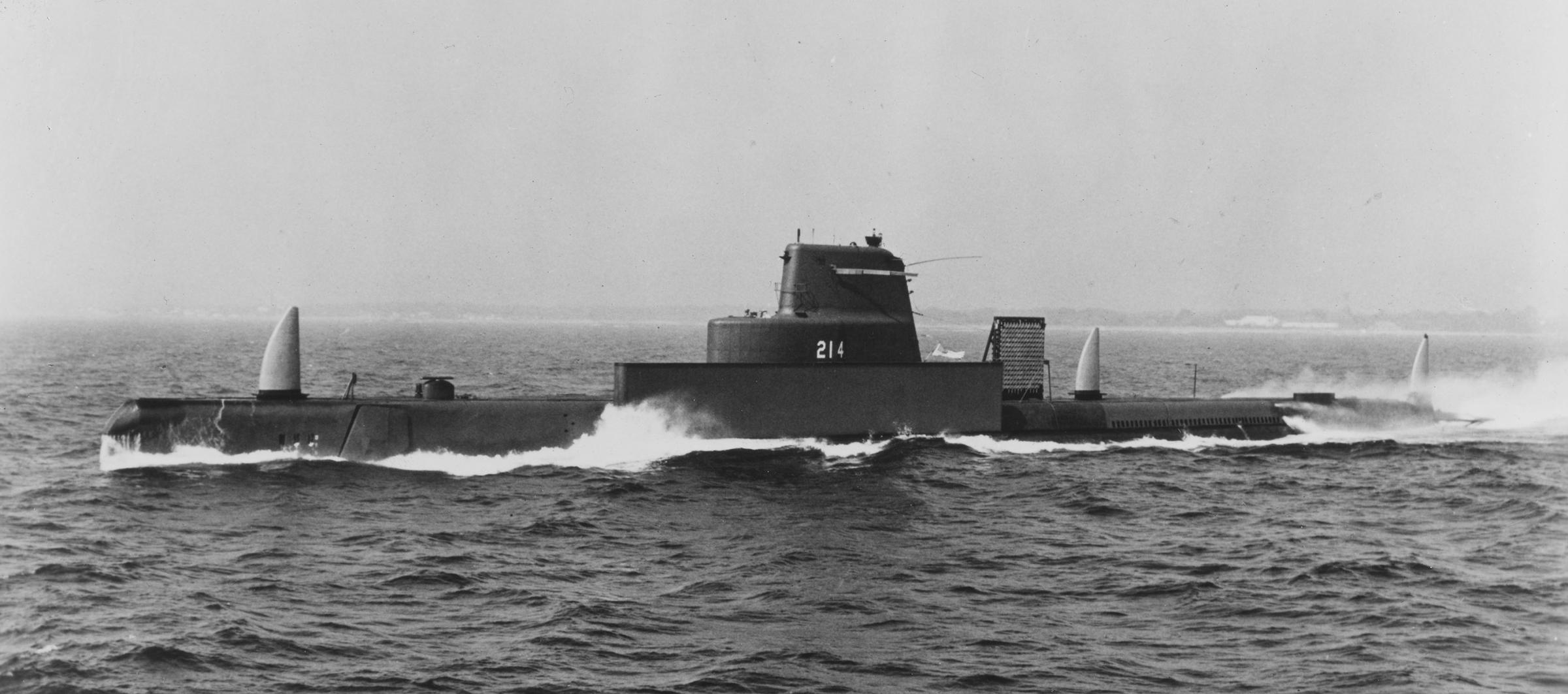
Grouper after conversion to a research submarine.

Grouper was reclassified AGSS-214, 17 May 1958, and on 28 November 1959 she entered the Portsmouth Naval Shipyard for extensive modification. Her forward torpedo room was converted into a floating laboratory; work benches and additional berths for scientists were installed, and various types of sonar gear were added topside. Thus equipped, Grouper departed Portsmouth on 23 June 1960 to embark on the fourth phase of her long career, research vessel for the Naval Research and Underwater Sound Laboratories. Her duties as a floating laboratory took her frequently to the Caribbean and Bermuda, although she retained New London as her home port and engaged in operations there and as far north as Nova Scotia. Her efforts were focused on the study of sound propagation in water. In December 1962, Grouper entered the Philadelphia Naval Shipyard for overhaul and modification to prepare for further work in this field. Grouper left the Philadelphia Naval Shipyard in May 1963 to resume her investigation of waterborne sound.

== 1964–1968 ==
In June 1964, Grouper was awarded the Battle Efficiency "E". In November 1965, the submarine again entered the Philadelphia Naval Shipyard for overhaul and equipment modifications to increase her usefulness as a floating underwater sound laboratory. She departed Philadelphia on 1 May 1966, reached New London on 1 June, and headed for the Caribbean for intensive research. Her studies during 1966 also took her to Narragansett Bay and twice to Bermuda. At the beginning of 1967, Grouper was at New London preparing to resume gathering knowledge of underwater sound propagation.

Up until the end of 1968, Grouper was continued to work as a floating laboratory.

In May 1965 Grouper surpassed the record previously held by USS O-4 (SS-65) for serving the longest as the oldest submarine in the U.S. Navy.

Grouper was decommissioned and stricken on 2 December 1968. On 11 August 1970, she was sold for scrapping.

== Awards ==
- Navy E Ribbon
- American Campaign Medal
- Asiatic–Pacific Campaign Medal with 10 battle stars
- World War II Victory Medal
- National Defense Service Medal with star

== In media ==
Grouper's 1943 mission to land men and gear on New Britain is depicted in "The Grouper Story," a 1957 episode of The Silent Service, an American television series that aired in syndication in the United States for two seasons in 1957 and 1958.
