= National Parks Association =

National Park(s) Association may refer to:

- Madagascar National Parks Association, a private group managing protected areas in Madagascar
- National Parks Conservation Association, an independent National Parks System advocacy organization in the United States that was previously named the National Parks Association (from 1919 to 1970)
- National Recreation and Park Association, an environmental advocacy group in the United States
- San Francisco Maritime National Park Association, a group that supports the National Historical Park in California, USA
- Victorian National Parks Association, the prime supporter of nature conservation in the Australian state of Victoria
