= USS Sea Cat =

Submarine of the United States

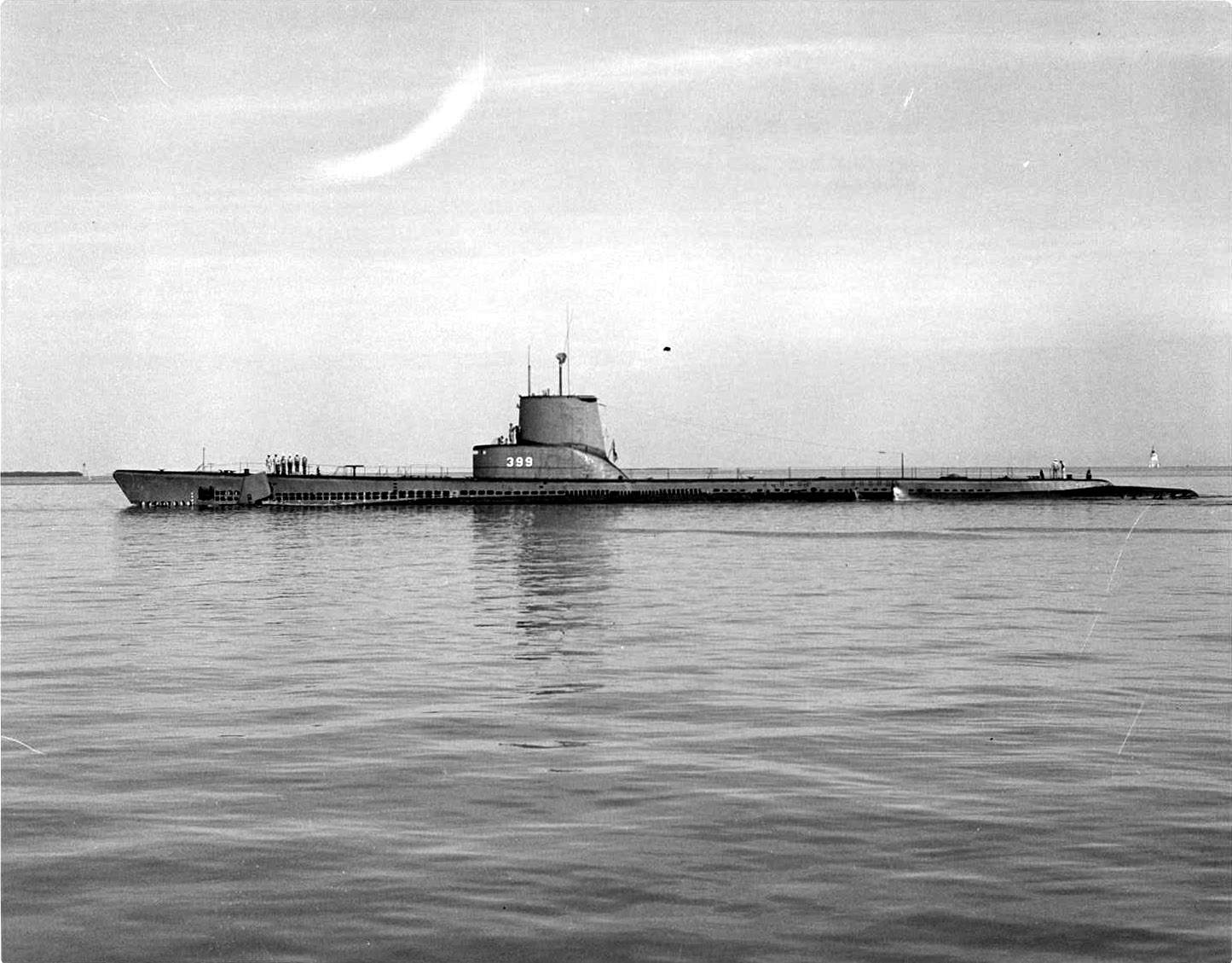
- Sea Cat (SS-399), port side view, 1952.

History

United States
- Builder: Portsmouth Naval Shipyard, Kittery, Maine
- Laid down: 30 October 1943
- Launched: 21 February 1944
- Commissioned: 16 May 1944
- Decommissioned: 2 December 1968
- Stricken: 2 December 1968
- Fate: Sold for scrap, 18 May 1973

General characteristics
- Class & type: Balao class diesel-electric submarine
- Displacement: 1,526 tons (1,550 t) surfaced; 2,391 tons (2,429 t) submerged
- Length: 311 ft 6 in (94.95 m)
- Beam: 27 ft 3 in (8.31 m)
- Draft: 16 ft 10 in (5.13 m) maximum
- Propulsion: 4 × Fairbanks-Morse Model 38D8-⅛ 10-cylinder opposed piston diesel engines driving electrical generators; 2 × 126-cell Sargo batteries; 4 × high-speed Elliott electric motors with reduction gears; two propellers; 5,400 shp (4.0 MW) surfaced; 2,740 shp (2.0 MW) submerged
- Speed: 20.25 knots (38 km/h) surfaced; 8.75 knots (16 km/h) submerged
- Range: 11,000 nautical miles (20,000 km) surfaced at 10 knots (19 km/h)
- Endurance: 48 hours at 2 knots (3.7 km/h) submerged; 75 days on patrol
- Test depth: 400 ft (120 m)
- Complement: 10 officers, 70–71 enlisted
- Armament: 10 × 21-inch (533 mm) torpedo tubes; 6 forward, 4 aft; 24 torpedoes; 1 × 5-inch (127 mm) / 25 caliber deck gun; Bofors 40 mm and Oerlikon 20 mm cannon

USS Sea Cat (SS/AGSS-399), a Balao-class submarine, was a ship of the United States Navy named for a shortened form of sea catfish, a marine fish of little food value found off the southeastern coast of the United States commissioned on 16 May 1944, with Commander Rob Roy McGregor in command. During World War II Sea Cat operated within the Pacific theatre, conducting four war patrols in wolf packs accounting for up to 17400 tons in the form of three cargo ships and an enemy vessel (17000 tons unconfirmed by wartime Japanese records). Sea Cat earned three battle stars for her World War II service.

After two and one-half years of exercises out of Balboa, her home port was changed to Key West in June 1949. In the autumn, it was decided to have a number of experimental changes made to the ship during her forthcoming overhaul, and she was redesignated AGSS-399 on 30 September. On 7 November, she arrived at the Philadelphia Naval Shipyard where the work was done. The modifications and repairs were completed on 11 March 1950, and the submarine returned, via New London, to Key West. She operated from that base until she got under way on 9 January 1952 for Philadelphia and another overhaul. After her arrival on 15 January, she was converted to a Fleet Snorkel submarine and redesignated SS-399. She operated in Floridas waters and the Caribbean until she was decommissioned on 2 December 1968 and struck from the Navy list on the same day. She was sold for scrapping, 18 May 1973.

== World War II service ==
Sea Cat was laid down on 30 October 1943 by the Portsmouth Navy Yard in Kittery, Maine; launched on 21 February 1944, sponsored by Mrs. E. L. Cochrane; and commissioned on 16 May 1944, Commander Rob Roy McGregor in command.

After shakedown and trials off the New England coast, the new submarine departed New London, Conn., on 28 August and proceeded via the Panama Canal to Hawaii. Following training in Hawaiian waters, Sea Cat departed Pearl Harbor on 28 October and headed, via Midway and Saipan, for the South China Sea where she operated in a wolf pack which also included Pampanito (SS-383), Pipefish (SS-388), and Searaven (SS-196).

During the war patrol, Sea Cat fired torpedoes at two Japanese merchantmen which, together, displaced about 15,000 tons. Her commanding officer thought that they had both been sunk, but a postwar study of Japanese records did not confirm either sinking. After 61 days at sea, including 37 days in her patrol area, Sea Cat arrived at Guam for refit.

The submarine got underway again on 1 February 1945 for her second war patrol which she conducted in the East China Sea in a wolf pack which included Segundo (SS-398) and Razorback (SS-394). During operations off the coast of Kyūshū, she damaged a 300-ton cargo ship by gunfire and attacked a 2,000-ton ship with torpedoes. Although she reported sinking the latter, Japanese records do not seem to support the claim. Sea Cat completed the patrol upon arriving at Midway on 24 March.

On 27 April, the submarine sailed for the Yellow Sea where she and six other submarines preyed upon Japanese shipping. Sea Cat accounted for 400 tons of enemy vessels by gunfire, and she picked up two survivors of the sunken enemy ships for questioning before returning to Pearl Harbor on 25 June.

She headed toward the Kuril Islands on 6 August for her fourth war patrol; but, upon arrival in her patrol area, learned that hostilities had ceased. She was ordered to proceed to the Japanese home islands and was in Tokyo Bay during the formal surrender ceremony on 2 September. Sea Cat earned three battle stars for her World War II service.

She then sailed for the Marianas and reached Guam on 7 September. Following a brief stay at Apra Harbor, the submarine headed home. Following operations in the San Diego area into the spring of 1946, the ship proceeded to San Francisco Bay and arrived at Mare Island on 15 April 1946 for overhaul.

== Post War duties in Atlantic ==
Yard work completed on 26 July, Sea Cat sailed back to San Diego, whence she departed on 12 August for her first simulated war patrol. On this cruise she visited Hawaii; Canton Island; Swains, Samoa, and Atafu Island; Tsingtao, and Shanghai.

Then, transferred to the Atlantic Fleet, the submarine arrived at Balboa, Canal Zone, on 12 January 1947. After two and one-half years of exercises out of Balboa, her home port was changed to Key West in June 1949. In the autumn, it was decided to have a number of experimental changes made to the ship during her forthcoming overhaul, and she was redesignated AGSS-399 on 30 September. On 7 November, she arrived at the Philadelphia Naval Shipyard where the work was done. The modifications and repairs were completed on 11 March 1950, and the submarine returned, via New London, to Key West. She operated from that base until she got under way on 9 January 1952 for Philadelphia and another overhaul. After her arrival on 15 January, she was converted to a Fleet Snorkel submarine and redesignated SS-399.

Overhaul and conversion completed. Sea Cat departed Philadelphia on 26 June 1952 and returned to Key West. She operated from that base for the remainder of her career, spending most of her time in the Caribbean, the Gulf of Mexico, and in waters off the southern coast of the United States. In July 1966, she interrupted her customary routine by crossing the Atlantic for a four-month deployment with the 6th Fleet in the Mediterranean.

Upon returning to Key West on 30 October, the submarine resumed her former routine and operated in Florida waters and the Caribbean until she was decommissioned on 2 December 1968 and struck from the Navy list on the same day. She was sold for scrapping, 18 May 1973.
