= USS Pipefish =

Submarine of the United States

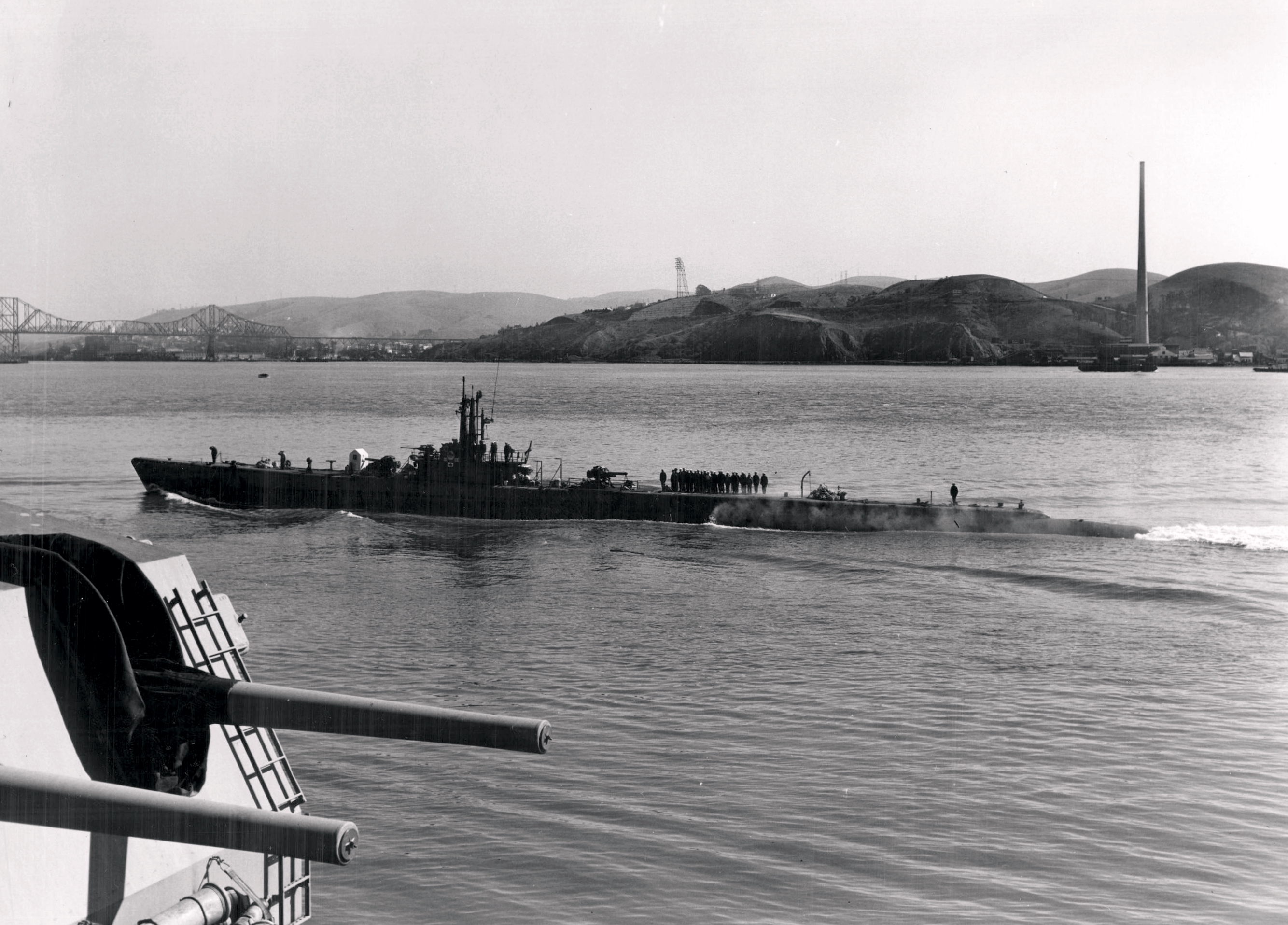
- USS Pipefish (SS-388) in 1946

History

United States
- Builder: Portsmouth Naval Shipyard, Kittery, Maine
- Laid down: 31 May 1943
- Launched: 12 October 1943
- Sponsored by: Mrs. George J. Bates
- Commissioned: 22 January 1944
- Decommissioned: 19 March 1946
- Reclassified: AGSS-388, 1 December 1962
- Stricken: 1 March 1967
- Fate: Sold for scrap on 4 February 1969

General characteristics
- Class & type: Balao-class diesel-electric submarine
- Displacement: 1,526 tons (1,550 t) surfaced, 2,391 tons (2,429 t) submerged
- Length: 311 ft 6 in (94.95 m)
- Beam: 27 ft 3 in (8.31 m)
- Draft: 16 ft 10 in (5.13 m) maximum
- Propulsion: 4 × Fairbanks-Morse Model 38D8-⅛ 10-cylinder opposed piston diesel engines driving electrical generators; 2 × 126-cell Sargo batteries; 4 × high-speed Elliott electric motors with reduction gears; two propellers; 5,400 shp (4.0 MW) surfaced; 2,740 shp (2.0 MW) submerged
- Speed: 20.25 kn (37.50 km/h) surfaced, 8.75 kn (16.21 km/h) submerged
- Range: 11,000 nmi (20,000 km) @ 10 kn (19 km/h) surfaced
- Endurance: 48 hours @ 2 kn (3.7 km/h) submerged, 75 days on patrol
- Test depth: 400 ft (120 m)
- Complement: 10 officers, 70–71 enlisted
- Armament: 10 × 21-inch (533 mm) torpedo tubes; 6 forward, 4 aft; 24 torpedoes; 1 × 5-inch (127 mm) / 25 caliber deck gun; Bofors 40 mm and Oerlikon 20 mm cannon

USS Pipefish (SS-388/AGSS-388), a Balao-class submarine in service with the United States Navy from 1944 to 1946. She was sold for scrap in 1969.

== Construction and commissioning ==
Pipefish was laid down on 31 May 1943 by the Portsmouth Navy Yard. She was launched on 12 October 1943 sponsored by Mrs. George J. Bates, and commissioned on 22 January 1944. She was the only ship of the United States Navy to be named for the pipefish.

== Service history ==
Following training off the East Coast, Pipefish proceeded via the Panama Canal to Pearl Harbor, where she arrived on 3 May 1944.

On her first war patrol - 24 May-16 July - Pipefish cruised west of the Mariana Islands, as a rescue submarine for pre-invasion carrier strikes on Saipan, saving one pilot on 12 June. She also cruised in the Surigao Straits to block Japanese escape from the Battle of the Philippine Sea. She moored at Majuro on 16 July.

On her second war patrol - 6 August-27 September - she patrolled off the southeastern coast of Honshū, Japan. Pipefish sank Hakutetsu Maru Number Seven on 12 September. While evading escorts after that attack, she struck bottom four times. She returned to Pearl Harbor on 27 September.

On her third war patrol - 28 October 1944 – 6 January 1945, Pipefish roamed southwest of Taiwan and off the east coast of Hainan Island, China, operating with Pampanito, Sea Cat, and Searaven. On 30 November Pipefish was damaged from an air attack but remained on patrol in the South China Sea. Attacking a convoy, Pipefish sank Coastal Defense Vessel Number 64 on 3 December. She arrived at Majuro on 6 January.

On her fourth war patrol - 31 January to 26 March - Pipefish provided rescue capability for downed aviators in the Nansei Shoto area.

During her fifth war patrol - 28 April to 16 June - she performed lifeguard duty for B-29 Superfortress aviators off Honshū, and in the Nanpō Islands area. Pipefish saved eight aviators on 26 May, 29 May, and 10 June. She moored at Midway Island on 16 June.

Her sixth war patrol - 15 July-28 August - called for lifeguard duty in the Nanpō Islands area and off the east coast of Kyūshū. On patrol she destroyed eight naval mines. Following termination of hostilities with Japan she arrived at Pearl Harbor on 28 August, and then proceeded to the West Coast.

Pipefish decommissioned on 19 March 1946, and joined the Pacific Reserve Fleet. She was redesignated AGSS-388 on 1 December 1962. She was struck from the Naval Vessel Register on 1 March 1967 and sold on 20 January 1969.

== Awards ==
Pipefish received four battle stars for her World War II service.
