= Viridien Satellite Mapping =

- Industry: Satellite mapping and geoscience applications
- Predecessor: Fugro NPA Ltd
- Founded: 1972
- Founder: Nigel Press
- Headquarters: Crawley, West Sussex, UK
- Area served: Worldwide
- Parent: Viridien
- Website: www.viridiengroup.com/expertise/satellite-mapping

Viridien Satellite Mapping, formerly known as NPA Satellite Mapping, is a European satellite mapping company specializing in earth observation and remote sensing. Its activities include processing and distributing data from satellite-based sensors, as well as interpreting satellite imagery for geological and environmental applications.

== Company ==
In 1972 geologist Nigel Press founded Nigel Press Associates (NPA), a company focused on satellite mapping for Geological Applications. The Organisation was renamed to Viridien Satellite Mapping in 2024 following a corporate rebranding.

== Historic Milestones ==
In 1972, Nigel Press founded NPA and began analyzing satellite imagery for geological purposes, generating maps to support Earth science, oil and gas, and mineral exploration. A team consisting of Remote sensing specialists and Earth scientists provided geological interpretation services, while also reselling satellite datasets.

In 1991, the offshore analysis team was created, leveraging Synthetic Aperture Radar (SAR) technology to detect oil slicks and natural seeps with support from UK Space (formerly BNSC), launching a global seep database and product line.

In 1995, the InSAR analysis team was established, making Nigel Press Associates the longest-running commercial provider of InSAR solutions focused on ground displacement data for the oil and gas industry.

In 2008, Nigel Press Associates was acquired by Fugro, expanding its services and connections across various industries.

In 2013, the company was sold to CGG and renamed CGG Satellite Mapping, growing through internal investment in innovation and digital frameworks.

In 2024, CGG rebranded to Viridien at the 2024 EAGE Annual Conference in Oslo.

== Operations ==
Viridien Satellite Mapping has remained in continuous operation since 1972. The company approaches geological mapping, offshore oil and gas exploration, and environmental monitoring via various satellite imaging technologies.

=== Imagery and Elevation Data ===
Viridien Satellite Mapping distributes optical and radar imagery at various resolutions. Viridien also provides advice and acquisition services for more niche customer applications. As a member of the SARCOM consortium, it also distributes radar data from European Space Agency satellites. Viridien supplies satellite and airborne-derived terrain and elevation products, including Digital Elevation Models (DEMs), building height maps, 3D views, and fly-throughs.

=== Oil and Mineral Exploration ===
Viridien Satellite Mapping specializes in a range of techniques for both onshore, and offshore exploration. The Global Offshore Seepage Database uses Earth Observation data to observe oil seepage in marine settings. For onshore setting, structural and spectral geological interpretation is assisted with seismic planning, subsidence mapping, and reservoir modeling methods.

=== Ground Stability ===
Interferometric Synthetic Aperture Radar (InSAR) uses satellite radar data to generate maps of the ground, structure displacement, or elevation. Depending on the situation, InSAR can detect and monitor centimetre-to-millimetre-scale deformation over wide areas, right down to the monitoring of local areas and structures. Applications include monitoring urban structures, infrastructure, tunneling, subsidence, landslides, resource extraction, and geological phenomena.

In addition to its commercial projects, Viridien Satellite Mapping participates in national and European initiatives, collaborating with organizations such as British National Space Centre, British Geological Survey, and the European Space Agency (ESA). Projects include Terrafirma, a ground motion hazard information service that disseminates critical data to national geological surveys and institutions across Europe, and the Pipemon project, which examined the use of remote sensing technology for pipeline routing and monitoring. The company also collaborated with the Environmental Agency on Persistent Scatter Interferometry (PSI) in London, which attracted national media coverage for revealing ongoing subsidence in East London.

== See also ==
- Remote Sensing
- Geographic information system (GIS)
- Geomatics
- Geophysical survey
- Interferometric Synthetic Aperture Radar (InSAR)
- Imagery Analysis
- Imaging Science
- Land cover
- List of Earth observation satellites
- Synthetic Aperture Radar
