= MapAction =

- Established: 2002
- Legal status: Active
- Headquarters: Chinnor, England, United Kingdom
- (Interim) Chief Executive: Darren Dovey KFSM
- Chair of the Board of Trustees: Nick Moody
- Revenue: £1,131,359
- Website: www.mapaction.org

MapAction is an independent non-governmental organisation that specialises in providing mapping for humanitarian emergencies. MapAction is a registered UK charity, subject to UK law and financial regulation.

MapAction works with a range of partners including United Nations agencies, International non-governmental organisations and the Red Cross and Red Crescent Movement. It also works with regional inter-state organisations such as CDEMA (Caribbean Disaster Emergency Management Agency), the AHA Centre (ASEAN Humanitarian Assistance Centre) and CESDRR (Centre for Emergency Situations and Disaster Risk Reduction). MapAction uses its mapping and information management capacity to assist national disaster management agencies around the world in response and preparation for crises by helping them develop data, technology, and worker skills.

MapAction has a small full-time staff, with most of its work delivered by volunteers. Its volunteers are skilled in geographical information systems, data visualisation, data management and software development and are trained to work in emergencies. As well as responding to emergencies, the volunteers also provide training to others.

MapAction has historically been funded by traditional humanitarian donor governments including the UK, US, Germany, Netherlands, EC ECHO and Switzerland. Of those, as a result of widespread cuts to government funding, only the Swiss Government remains and MapAction now depends almost entirely on corporate and philanthropic sources to continue providing services that the humanitarian sector still depends upon.

MapAction was founded as Aid for Aid in 1999, becoming operational in 2002 and changing its name to MapAction soon after. Its first emergency mission was to Lesotho in 2003 and Sri Lanka in response to the Asian tsunami in December 2004. Since then it has sent teams to many emergencies all over the world including floods, earthquakes and hurricanes, and humanitarian situations such as Iraq, Afghanistan and Nigeria.
