= San Francisco Maritime National Park Association =

US non-profit organization

The San Francisco Maritime National Park Association was founded in 1950 as the San Francisco Maritime Museum Association to operate the then independent Maritime Museum. In 1978 the Maritime Museum was transferred to the National Park Service and now forms the core of the San Francisco Maritime National Historical Park.

In 2016, the San Francisco Maritime National Park Association acquired the Allen Knight collection. The collection encompassed artifacts from fifty-seven sunken or disassembled vessels, 9,000 ship photographs, a comprehensive research library, 250 log books, and 30 ship models. Certain segments of his assemblage could be compared to the reserves of institutions such as the Library of Congress or the Admiralty Office in London.

The group develops educational programs for the San Francisco Maritime National Historical Park, cooperating with the National Park Service as a non-profit partner. It also preserves, maintains, and documents the World War II submarine USS Pampanito, independently of the National Historical Park. The association acquired the submarine in 1976 and opened it to the public in 1982. It is currently attempting to restore the vessel to its state in 1945. The sub is currently moored at Pier 45 in San Francisco's Fisherman's Wharf area.

In 2025, a documentary commissioned by the organization was released about the history of the Aquatic Park Bathhouse.
