= Frank Berrien =

American football coach and United States Navy officer

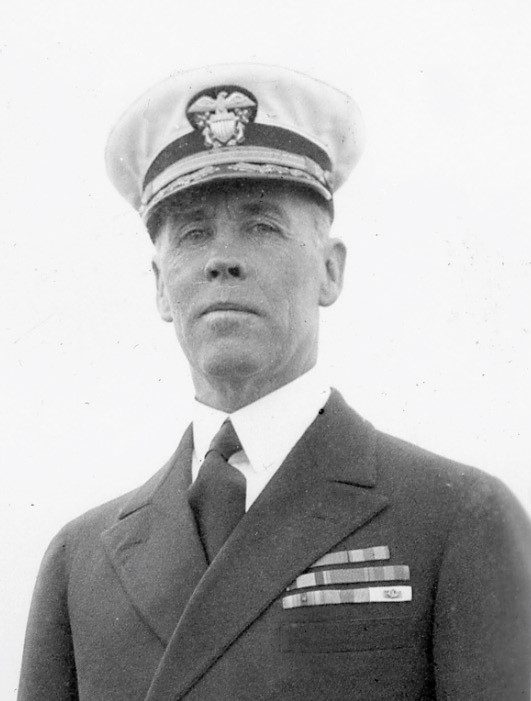
- Born: August 17, 1877; Galesburg, Illinois, U.S.
- Died: January 31, 1951 (aged 73); New Haven, Connecticut, U.S.
- Burial place: U.S. Naval Academy Cemetery, Annapolis, Maryland
- Military career
- Allegiance: United States
- Branch: United States Navy
- Service years: 1898, 1900–1935, 1942
- Rank: Rear Admiral
- Commands: USS Lexington; European Destroyer Squadron, Atlantic Fleet; Naval Submarine Base New London; USS Comfort; USS Wilkes; USS Nicholson; USS Trippe
- Conflicts: Spanish–American War; Boxer Rebellion; Philippine–American War; Mexican Revolution; ● Occupation of Veracruz; World War I; ● Action of 17 November 1917; World War II
- Awards: Navy Distinguished Service Medal
- Other work: Football coach at the United States Naval Academy in Annapolis.

Frank Dunn Berrien (August 17, 1877 – January 31, 1951) was an American football coach and United States Navy officer who served during six conflicts. He was the 13th head football coach for the United States Naval Academy located in Annapolis, Maryland and he held that position for three seasons, from 1908 until 1910. His coaching record at Navy was 21–5–3. As commanding officer of the USS Nicholson, he fought in the action of 17 November 1917 and subsequently received the Navy Distinguished Service Medal.

== Biography ==
Born in Galesburg, Illinois and raised in Iowa, Berrien graduated from Clinton High School in 1895. Appointed to the Naval Academy, he played right end on the football team and second base on the baseball team. During the Spanish–American War, Berrien served aboard the protected cruiser USS Cincinnati. After graduating in June 1900, he served in the Asiatic Squadron during both the Boxer Rebellion and the Philippine–American War. On November 9, 1907, Berrien married Mary Elizabeth Whittelsey in New Haven, Connecticut.

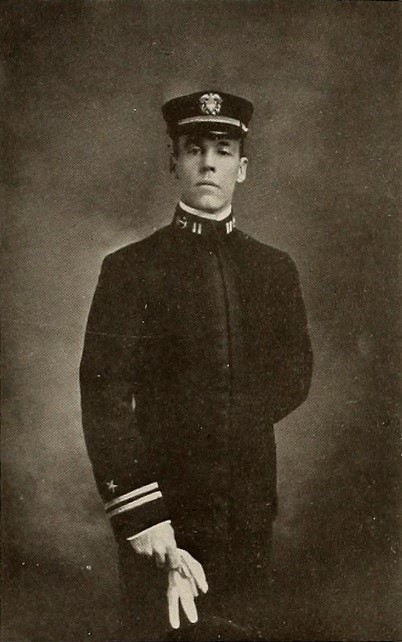
As head coach in 1909

Back at the Naval Academy as head football coach, Berrien also served as an instructor of ordnance and gunnery. From March 1911 to June 1914, he served as the first commanding officer of the destroyer USS Trippe. From April to May 1914, Trippe conducted patrol operations in support of the occupation of Veracruz. In 1917, Berrien graduated from the Naval War College. During World War I, he commanded the destroyers Nicholson and Wilkes. Just before the Armistice, Berrien served as commanding officer of the hospital ship USS Comfort during her voyage from New York City to Brest, France.

From 1921 to 1923, Berrien was given command of the submarine base at New London, Connecticut. He was promoted to captain in June 1922. From 1923 to 1925, Berrien commanded the European destroyer squadron of the U.S. Atlantic Fleet. He then attended the Army War College, graduating in 1926. From 1926 to 1928, Berrien served as a professor of naval science and tactics at Yale University. From June to August 1928, he was a student at the naval air station at Pensacola, Florida, earning his naval aviation observer rating. From August 1928 to June 1930, Berrien was the second commanding officer of the aircraft carrier USS Lexington. From 1930 to 1934, he served as captain of the yard at the Washington Navy Yard.

From 1934 to 1935, Berrien was assigned to the hydrographic yard in Boston, Massachusetts. He retired from active duty on June 30, 1935 and was advanced to rear admiral on the retired list based on his service record. From March to July 1942, he was the only member of the Naval Academy Class of 1900 who returned to active duty during World War II. He was assigned to the 12th Naval District, where he supervised troop convoys between San Francisco, California and Australia.

In addition to his Distinguished Service Medal, Berrien was made a companion of the Order of St Michael and St George by the United Kingdom for his World War I service and a commander of the Order of the Saviour by Greece. He died at his home in New Haven, Connecticut at the age of 73.

== Head coaching record ==
Year	Team	Overall	Conference	Standing	Bowl/playoffs
Navy Midshipmen (Independent) (1908–1910)
1908	Navy	9–2–1			
1909	Navy	4–3–1			
1910	Navy	8–0–1			
Navy:		21–5–3			
Total:		21–5–3			
