= Action of 17 November 1917 =

Naval battle between US and German forces

- Part of World War I Atlantic U-boat Campaign
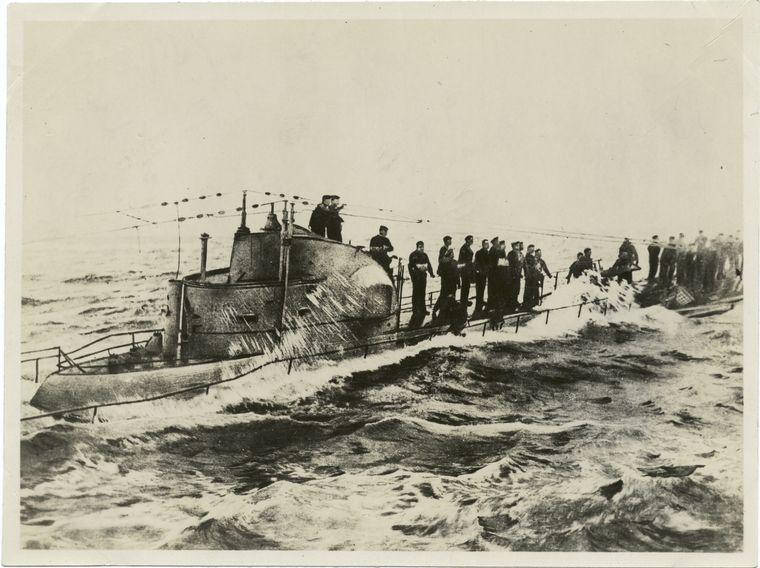
- The crew of U-58 evacuating ship.
Date	17 November 1917
Location	North Atlantic Ocean 51°31′48″N 5°21′0″W
Result	American victory

Belligerents
United States	German Empire

Commanders and leaders
Frank Berrien; Arthur S. Carpender	Gustav Amberger

Strength
Destroyer USS Fanning; Destroyer USS Nicholson	Submarine U-58

Casualties and losses
None	2 killed 39 captured U-58 sunk

The action of 17 November 1917 was a naval battle of the First World War. The action was fought between a German U-boat and two United States Navy destroyers in the North Atlantic Ocean.

== Action ==
Based in Queenstown, Ireland, USS Fanning and her sister destroyer USS Nicholson patrolled the eastern waters of the Atlantic Ocean. Their mission was to escort convoys and rescue survivors of sunken merchant ships as well as to seek out and destroy German U-boats. While escorting the eight vessel convoy OQ-20 eastbound, the two destroyers made contact with an enemy submarine.

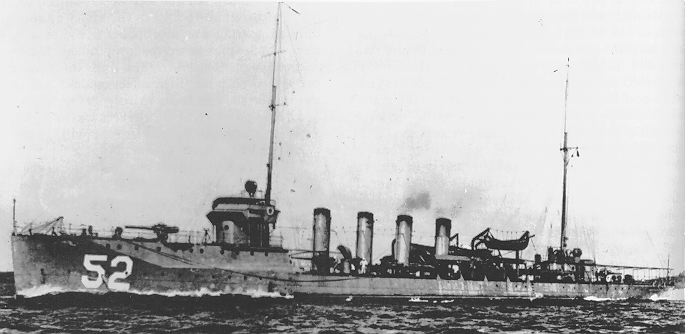
USS Nicholson during trials in 1915.

With Arthur S. Carpender commanding, at 4:10 on 17 November 1917, Coxswain Daniel David Loomis of the Fanning sighted U-58, commanded by Kapitänleutnant Gustav Amberger, when the U-boat had surfaced to extend her periscope. The German submarine lined up for a shot at the British merchant steamer SS Welshman and almost immediately Officer of the Deck Lieutenant William O. Henry ordered the destroyer to make circles and engage.

At 4:00 Fanning dropped three depth charges, scoring a hit which shook up the U-boat well. Then USS Nicholson joined in the fighting, commanded by Frank Berrien, and dropped another depth charge herself. The Americans spotted U-58 when it surfaced, and Fanning fired three shots with her stern gun. Nicholson struck the U-boat with at least one shot from her bow gun. The Germans unsuccessfully returned fire and surrendered at around 4:30. American fire had hit the submarine near its diving planes, making the sub unmaneuverable.

Kapitänleutnant Amberger ordered the ballast tanks blown and the submarine went up. Charges also knocked out the main generator aboard the Fanning. If U-58 had surfaced in a battle ready position, Fanning would have surely been attacked and possibly sunk. The German submariners surrendered and Fanning maneuvered to take prisoners. That ended the action with an American victory.

The Fanning and Nicholson's sinking of U-58 was one of only a few engagements of World War I in which U.S. Navy warships sank an enemy submarine. Also the first time U.S. ships sank a submarine in combat. Lieutenant William O. Henry and Coxswain Daniel Lommis both received a Navy Cross for their actions during their encounter with U-58.

Fanning and Nicholson continued the war escorting and patrolling the North Atlantic, making several more inconclusive contacts with German submarines. Thirty-eight of the 40 crew members of the U-58 survived to become prisoners of war in the United States.

== See also ==
- Action of 15 August 1915
- Action of 4 May 1917
- Action of 15 October 1917

== Bibliography ==
- Bauer, K. Jack; Roberts, Stephen S. (1991). Register of Ships of the U.S. Navy, 1775–1990: Major Combatants. New York: Greenwood Press. ISBN 978-0-313-26202-9. OCLC 24010356.
- Gardiner, Robert, ed. (1985). Conway's All the World's Fighting Ships 1906–1921. Annapolis, Maryland: Naval Institute Press. ISBN 978-0-87021-907-8. OCLC 12119866.
