= USS Muskallunge =

Submarine of the United States

Coordinates: 39.712°N 71.714°W

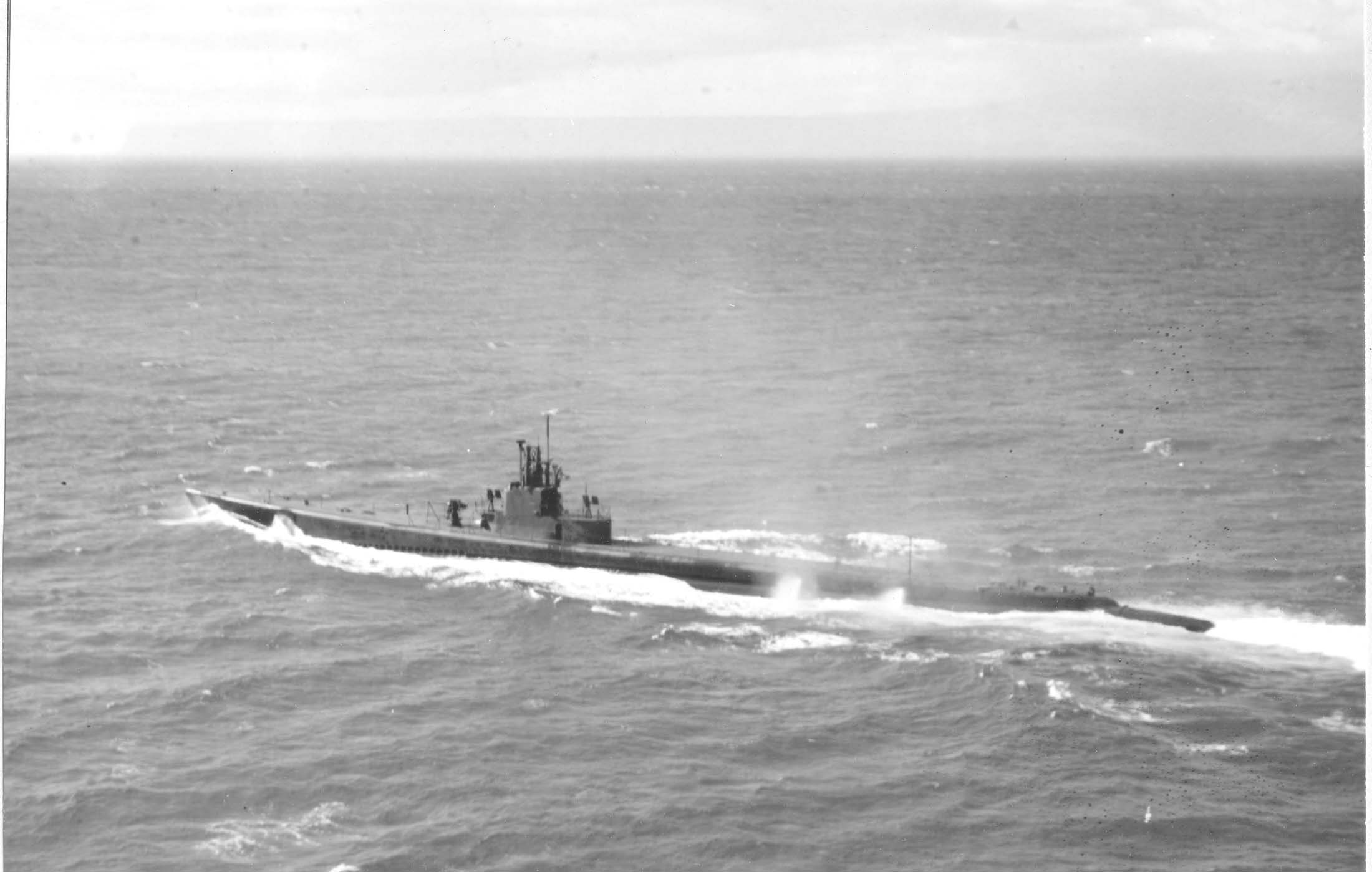
- Muskallunge (SS-262), off Pearl Harbor 4 Sept. 1943.

History

United States
- Name: USS Muskallunge (SS-262)
- Builder: Electric Boat Company, Groton, Connecticut
- Laid down: 7 April 1942
- Launched: 13 December 1942
- Sponsored by: Mrs. Merritt D. Graham
- Commissioned: 15 March 1943
- Decommissioned: 29 January 1947
- Recommissioned: 31 August 1956
- Decommissioned: 18 January 1957
- Stricken: 1 December 1967
- Fate: Transferred to Brazil unmodified, 18 January 1957

History

Brazil
- Name: Humaitá (S14)
- Acquired: 18 January 1957
- Fate: Returned to the United States March 1968, sunk as a target 9 July 1968

General characteristics
- Class & type: Gato-class diesel-electric submarine
- Displacement: 1,525 long tons (1,549 t) surfaced; 2,424 long tons (2,463 t) submerged
- Length: 311 ft 9 in (95.02 m)
- Beam: 27 ft 3 in (8.31 m)
- Draft: 17 ft 0 in (5.18 m) maximum
- Propulsion: 4 × Hooven-Owens-Rentschler (H.O.R.) diesel engines driving electrical generators; 2 × 126-cell Sargo batteries; 4 × high-speed Allis-Chalmers electric motors with reduction gears; two propellers; 5,400 shp (4.0 MW) surfaced; 2,740 shp (2.0 MW) submerged
- Speed: 21 kn (39 km/h); 9 knots (17 km/h) submerged
- Range: 11,000 nmi (20,000 km) surfaced at 10 kn (19 km/h)
- Endurance: 48 hours at 2 knots (4 km/h) submerged; 75 days on patrol
- Test depth: 300 ft (90 m)
- Complement: 6 officers, 54 enlisted
- Armament: 10 × 21-inch (533 mm) torpedo tubes; 6 forward, 4 aft; 24 torpedoes; 1 × 3-inch (76 mm) / 50 caliber deck gun; Bofors 40 mm and Oerlikon 20 mm cannon

USS Muskallunge (SS-262), a Gato-class submarine, was a ship of the United States Navy named for the muskallunge.

== Construction and commissioning ==
Muskallunge′s was keel was laid down on 7 April 1942 by the Electric Boat Company at Groton, Connecticut. She was launched on 13 December 1942, sponsored by Mrs. Merritt D. Graham, widow of Chief Torpedoman Graham, who was lost aboard the submarine USS Grunion (SS-216) in late July 1942, and commissioned on 15 March 1943, Lieutenant Commander (LCDR) Willard A. Saunders in command.

== First war patrol, September 1943 – January 1944 ==
Following shakedown, Muskallunge departed Naval Submarine Base New London, New London, Connecticut, for the Pacific, arriving at Pearl Harbor, Hawaii, on 7 August 1943. Before her first patrol, she was assigned the task of testing the Mark 14 torpedo against the cliffs of Kahoolawe, including the torpedo returned by the USS Tinosa (SS-283). Two of the three torpedoes detonated. The third was recovered and inspected, allowing the discovery of a flaw in the contact firing mechanism that had plagued the Mark 14 torpedo for 18 months.

She cleared Pearl Harbor 7 September for her first war patrol, taking station off the Palau Islands. Muskallunge carried the first electric torpedoes to be fired in the war by an American submarine. She made two attacks on Japanese convoys; although handicapped by malfunctioning torpedoes, she managed to damage a passenger freighter and a cargo ship. On 25 October Muskallunge returned to Pearl Harbor.

She sailed 27 November for her second war patrol, which was conducted in the western Carolines area and south of Guam. During this patrol Muskallunge scored hits on a tanker and two freighters, sinking one of the Noroto Maru class, before returning to Pearl Harbor 21 January 1944. From there, she went to the West Coast for overhaul.

== Third, fourth, and fifth war patrols, April – December 1944 ==
After overhaul at Mare Island early in the year, Muskallunge left Pearl Harbor 30 April on her third war patrol. In June she joined eight other submarines in an operation designed to intercept any enemy forces approaching the Marianas which the Navy was invading. In the ensuing Battle of the Philippine Sea two of these submarines landed fatal blows on Japanese carriers and American naval aircraft wiped out the Japanese Fleet's air arm in a one-sided melee known as "the Marianas Turkey Shoot." Muskallunge ended the patrol at Fremantle, Australia on 4 July.

In company with Flier, Muskallunge got underway 1 August for the South China Sea on her fourth war patrol. On 21 August off French Indochina she sank 7,163-ton passenger-cargo Durban Maru before being severely depth charged. The submarine docked in Fremantle 22 September for refit.

Her fifth war patrol, 19 October to 14 December, saw her operating west of Palawan Passage. She then left Pearl Harbor 16 December for overhaul at Mare Island Navy Yard, returning 9 April 1945.

== Sixth and seventh war patrols, April – August 1945 ==
On 26 April Muskallunge departed Pearl Harbor for patrol off Formosa. She also acted as lifeguard for Philippine-based airstrikes on China and Formosa on her sixth war patrol. She sailed to Midway Atoll via Saipan to complete the patrol on arrival 15 June.

Her seventh and last war patrol started 30 July when Muskallunge got underway for the Kurile Islands, north of Japan. On 8 August she attacked several small ships through dense fog. Her guns damaged two of the Japanese ships, but enemy fire killed one of the submarine's gunners and wounded two other bluejackets. The news of victory brought orders to Tokyo Bay for the surrender ceremonies on board the battleship Missouri 2 September. The next day Muskallunge sailed for New London via Pearl Harbor and the Panama Canal. After operations with the Atlantic Fleet, she decommissioned and joined the Atlantic Reserve Fleet there 29 January 1947.

Muskallunge received five battle stars for World War II service.

== Humaitá (S14), 1957–1968 ==
Muskallunge recommissioned 31 August 1956 prior to transfer to Brazil; decommissioned 18 January 1957, and the same day was loaned under the Military Assistance Program. She served the Brazilian Navy as Humaitá (S14) until returned to the United States in March 1968 and sunk as a target off Long Island, NY on 9 July 1968.

== Discovery ==
On 26 June 2021 NOAAS Okeanos Explorer explored the wreckage of Muskallunge with the ROV Deep Discoverer. The hull was found to have been severed near the forward engine room with the bow and stern falling to the sea floor separately.

== See also ==
- List of submarines of the Second World War
- List of historical ships of the Brazilian Navy

== Bibliography ==
- Wright, C. C. (2005). "Question 17/03: Replacement of US Submarine Diesel Engines". Warship International. XLII (4): 431–434. ISSN 0043-0374.
