= Mark 6 exploder =

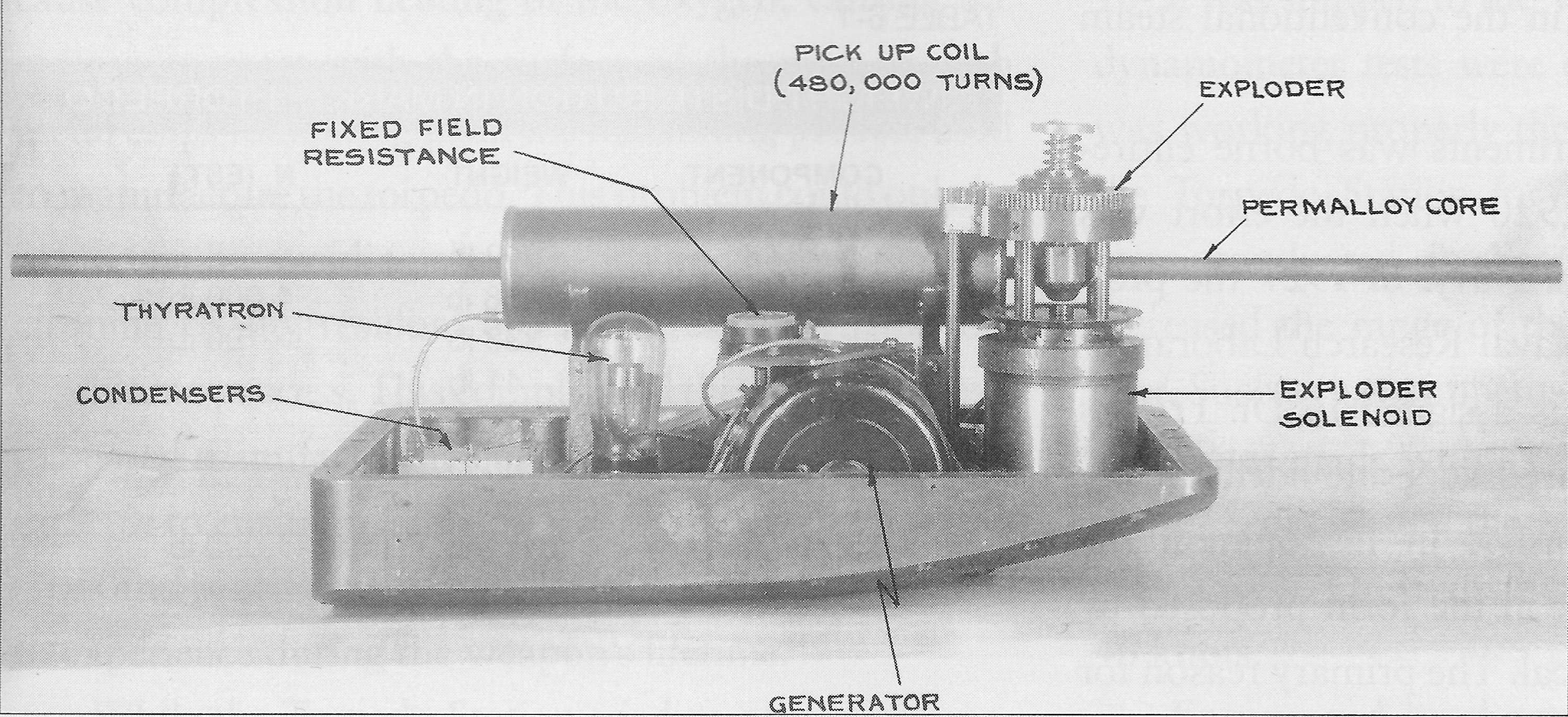
Mark 6 exploder. This version apparently does not have a voltage regulator.

The Mark 6 exploder was a United States Navy torpedo exploder developed in the 1920s. It was the standard exploder of the Navy's Mark 14 torpedo and Mark 15 torpedo. (Note: The similar Mark 13 torpedo used Mark 4 or Mark 8 exploders.)

== Development ==
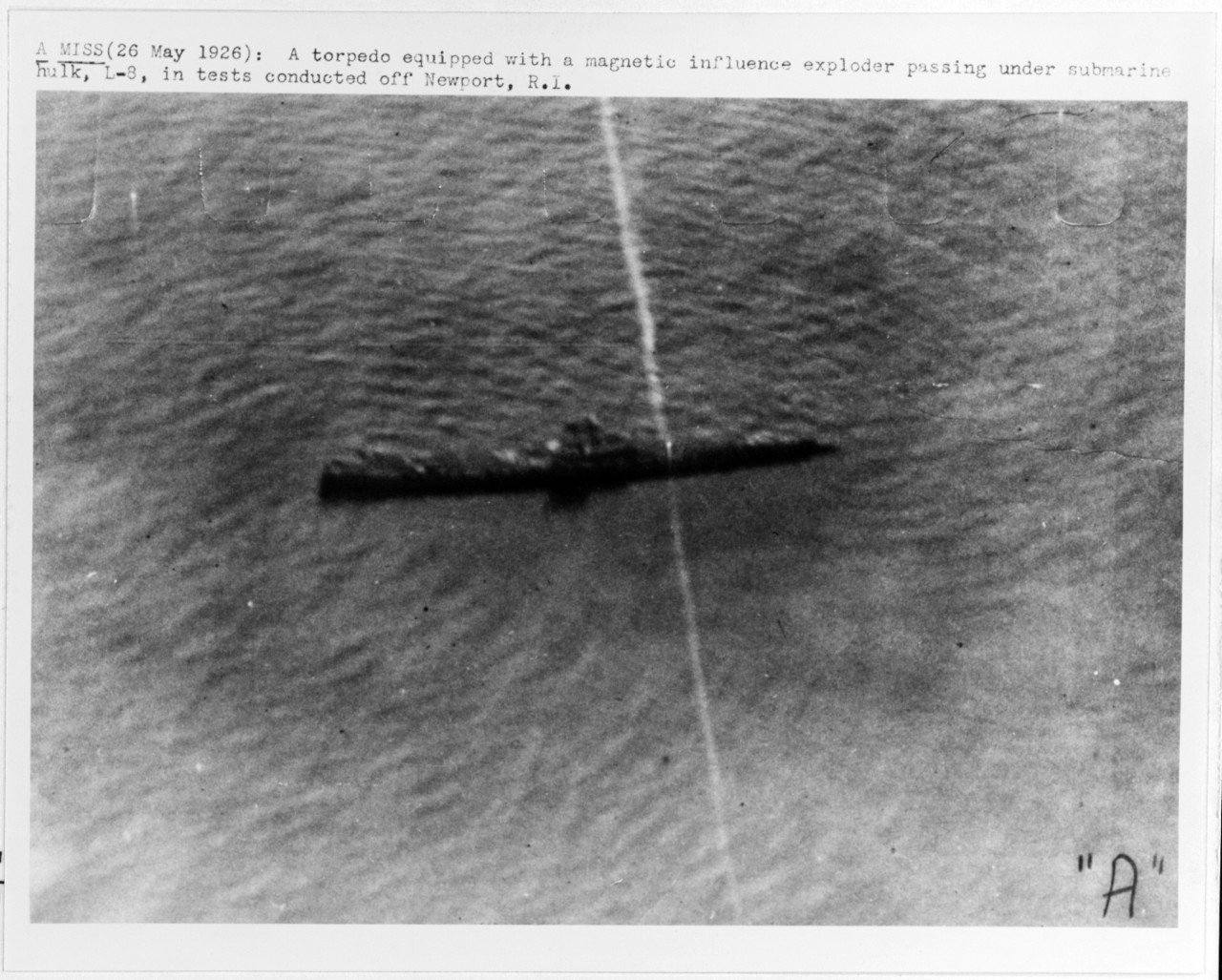
A failed 1926 test shot.

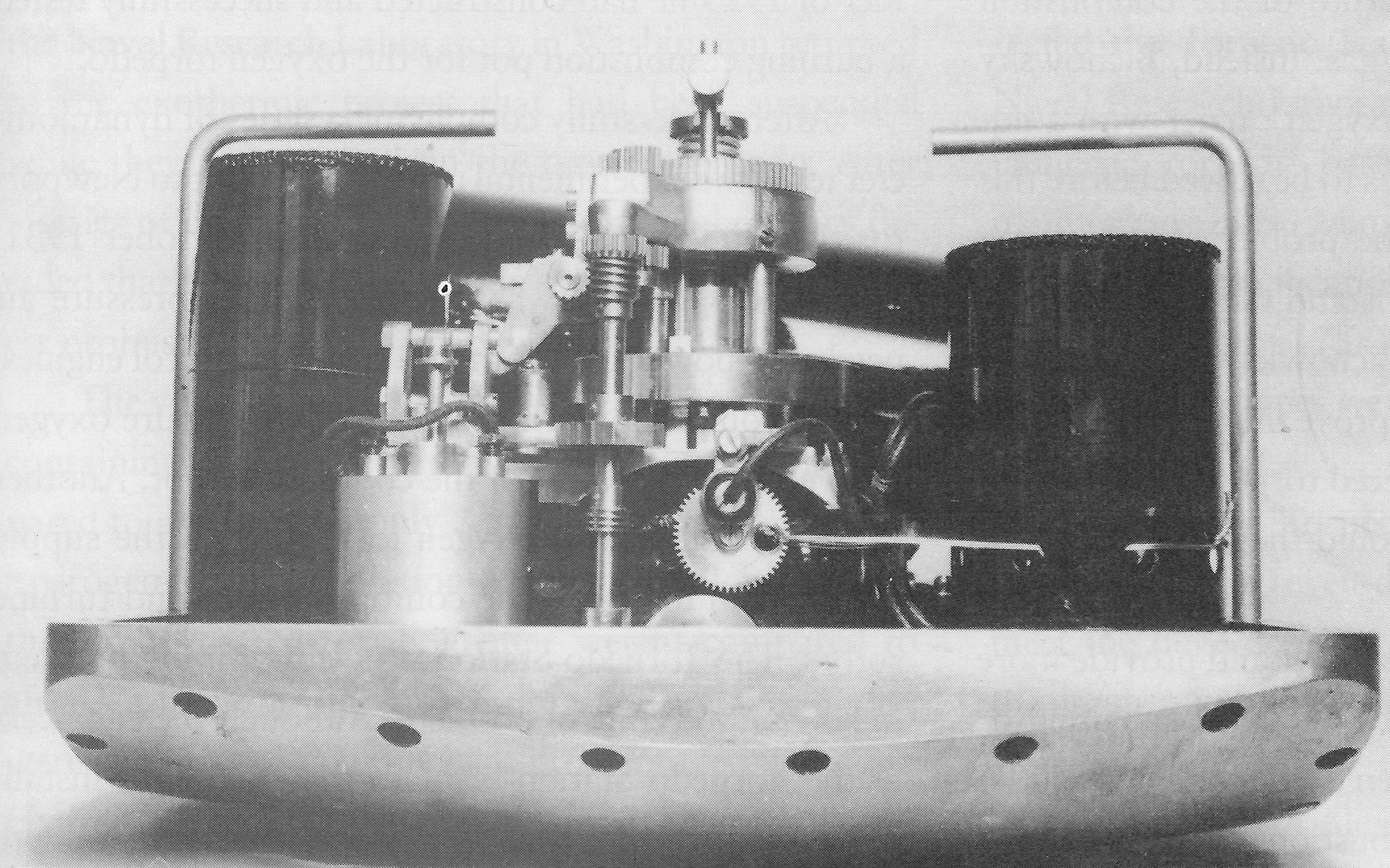
Defective, inadequately tested Mark 6 Mod 1 exploder used early in the war. In September 1943, it was replaced with the Mark 6 Mod 5.

Early torpedoes used contact exploders. A typical exploder had a firing pin that stuck out from the warhead and was restrained by a transverse shear pin. The torpedo would hit the target with enough energy to break the shear pin and allow the firing pin to strike a percussion cap that ultimately detonated the warhead. An arming impeller was an additional safety device: the firing pin could not move until the torpedo had traveled a preset distance.

Just before World War I, the Bureau of Ordnance (commonly called BuOrd) started developing an inertial exploder. The result was the Mark 3 exploder.

Warships employed defenses against torpedoes. A new technology, torpedo blisters, appeared on capital ships. The torpedo would explode against the blister but do little damage to the hull. Torpedo blisters were tested on two battleships, the decommissioned South Carolina and the unfinished Washington; the conclusion was the Mark 10 torpedo, with its contact exploder, could not disable a major warship. Torpedoes would need to explode underneath a capital ship, where there were no blisters or other armor. The Mark 14 torpedo was designed at the Newport Torpedo Station (NTS), Newport, to replace the Mark 10, which had been in service since World War I. Its fairly small 643 lb (292 kg) warhead required it to explode beneath the keel where there was no armor.

This led to the development of a magnetic influence feature, similar to the British Duplex and German models, all inspired by German magnetic mines of World War I. The Mark 6 was intended to fire the warhead beneath the ship, creating a huge gas bubble which would cause the keel to fail catastrophically.

The Mark 6 exploder, designated Project G53, was developed "behind the tightest veil of secrecy the Navy had ever created." In less than two years, Newport Torpedo Station produced a prototype with help from General Electric. The prototype exploder was fitted to a Mark 10 torpedo and test-fired in Narragansett Bay on 8 May 1926; the submarine USS L-8 was the target.

In the first test, the torpedo ran underneath the target submarine but did not explode; a second test was successful. Those two shots were the only live-fire tests until World War II. After several redesigns, General Electric in Schenectady made 30 production units, at a cost of US$1,000 apiece. The exploder was tested at the Newport lab and in a small field test aboard USS Raleigh.

At the urging of Lt. Ralph W. Christie, who headed the Mark 14's design team, equatorial tests were later conducted by USS Indianapolis, which fired one hundred trial shots between 10°N and 10°S and collected 7,000 readings. The tests were done using torpedoes with instrumented exercise heads: an electric eye would take an upward-looking picture from the torpedo; the magnetic influence feature would set off some gun cotton.

Due to budgetary constraints, very few live-fire trials of the torpedo or exploder were ever conducted. The goal of most exercise firings was to get the torpedo to run under the target, after which it was assumed the magnetic influence feature would do the work. This misplaced trust in the magnetic exploder helped mask the depth problems encountered by early torpedoes, for if the exploder were to work properly a depth error of a few feet would not matter. Chief of Naval Operations William V. Pratt offered the hulk of Cassin-class destroyer USS Ericsson, but prohibited the use of a live warhead, and insisted BuOrd pay the cost of refloating her if she was hit in error. These were strange restrictions, as Ericsson was due to be scrapped. BuOrd declined. A service manual for the exploder "was written—but, for security reasons, not printed—and locked in a safe."

== Problems ==
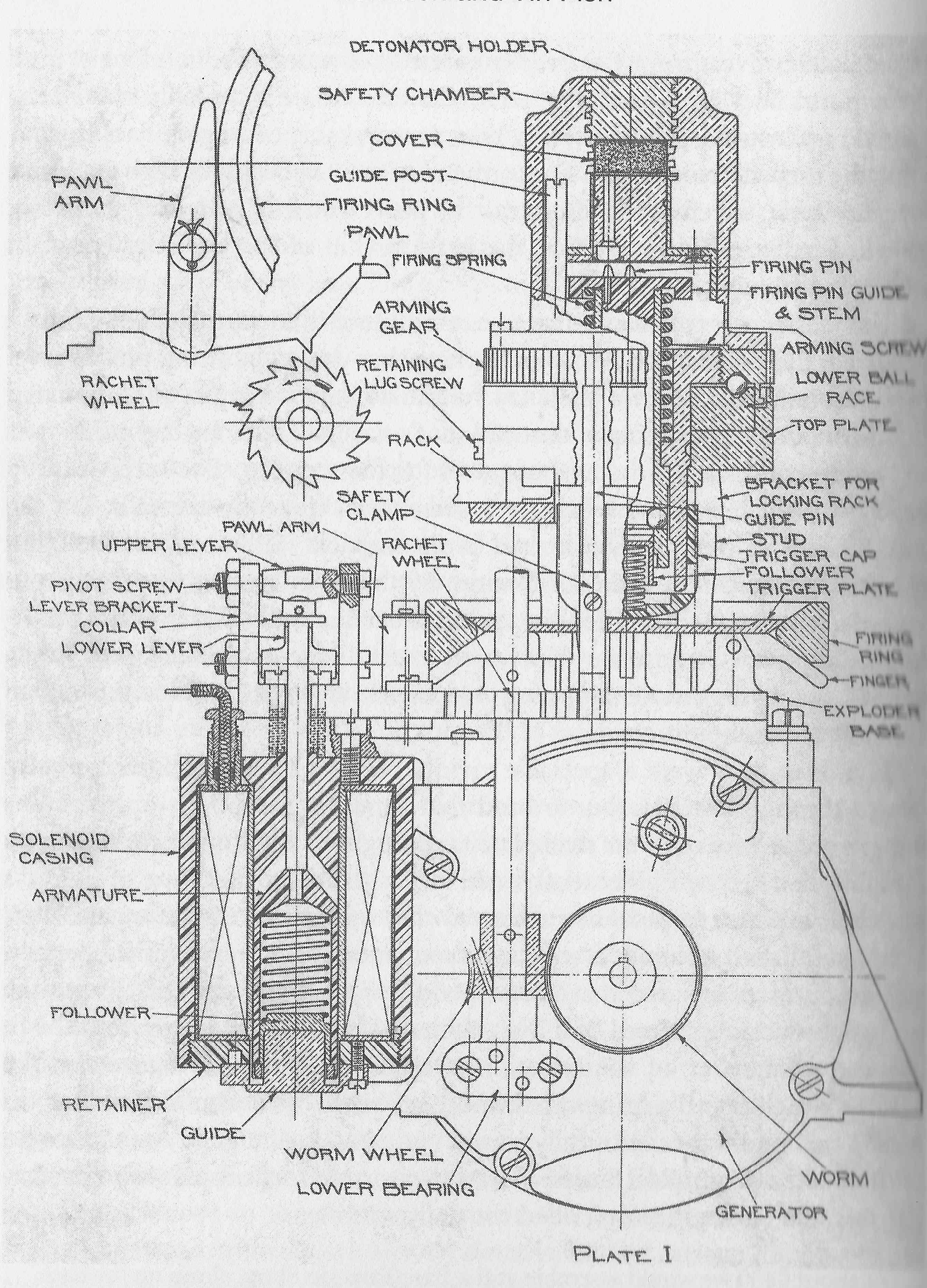
Mechanical drawing of the Mark6 Mod 1 exploder.

After the Mark 14 entered combat service in the Pacific War, it was discovered the torpedo had several major flaws. Two of these were directly related to the Mark 6 exploder:

- It often caused premature firing.
- The contact pistol frequently failed to fire the warhead. It often jammed with a textbook right angle hit to a ship's side as the firing pin could not take the shock of the impact.

Similar problems also plagued the Mark 15 torpedo used by U.S. Navy destroyers. The problems could lead to misses or failures, and tended to mask one another, making isolating any one of them more difficult.

=== Premature explosions ===
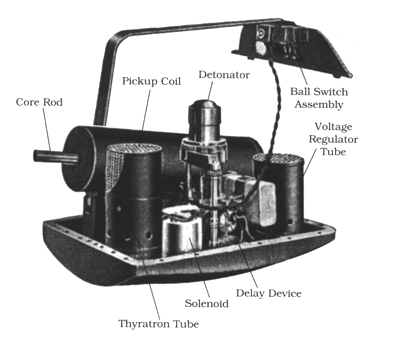
Later model of the Mark 6 magnetic exploder assembly that uses a ball switch assembly as the contact exploder. The ball switch did not have the high acceleration problems of the earlier models.

Many submarine commanders in the first two years of the war reported explosions of the warhead with little to no damage of the enemy. The magnetic exploders were triggering prematurely, before getting close enough to the vessel to destroy it. Earth's magnetic field near NTS, where the trials (limited as they were) were conducted, differed from the areas where the fighting was taking place.

=== Duds ===
Early reports of torpedo action included some dud hits, heard as a dull clang. In a few instances, Mark 14s would strike a Japanese ship and lodge in its hull without exploding. The contact pistol appeared to be malfunctioning, though the conclusion was anything but clear until running depth and magnetic exploder problems were solved. This experience was exactly the sort of live-fire trial BuOrd had been prevented from doing in peacetime, causing one submarine skipper to complain, "[Making] round trips of 8,500 miles (13,700 km) into enemy waters to gain attack positions undetected within 800 yards (730 m) of enemy ships only to find that torpedoes run deep and over half the time fail to function, seems to me an undesirable method of gaining information which might be determined any morning within a few miles of a torpedo station in the presence of comparatively few hazards." It was now clear to all at Pearl Harbor that the contact pistol was also defective.

== Solutions ==
Against orders, some submariners disabled the magnetic influence feature of the Mark 6 exploder, suspecting it was faulty. An increase in hits was reported. Shortly after replacing Wilkes in Fremantle, Rear Admiral Charles Lockwood ordered a historic net test at Frenchman Bay on 20 June 1942. Eight hundred Mark 14s had already been fired in combat.

After a historic net test by Jim Coe's Skipjack, BuOrd on 1 August 1942 finally conceded the Mark 14 ran deep, and six weeks later, "that its depth-control mechanism had been 'improperly designed and tested'". This satisfied Lockwood and Robert H. English (then COMSUBPAC), who both refused to believe the exploder could also be defective.

Finally, in July 1943, Admiral Lockwood (by then COMSUBPAC) ordered his boats to deactivate the Mark 6's influence feature and use only its contact pistol.

Tests were carried out by COMSUBPAC's gunnery and torpedo officer, Art Taylor (ex-Haddock). Taylor, "Swede" Momsen, and others fired warshots from Muskallunge into the cliffs of Kahoolawe, beginning 31 August. Their third test shot was a dud. This revealed the firing pin had not been able to contact the detonator hard enough to fire the warhead.

To avoid "shaking hands with St. Peter" (as Lockwood put it), E.A. Johnson, USNR, supervised by Taylor, dropped dummy warheads filled with sand from a crane raised to a height of 90 feet (27 m). In 7 out of 10 of these trials, firing mechanisms bent, jammed, and failed with the high inertia of a straight-on hit (the prewar ideal). A quick fix was to encourage "glancing" shots (which cut the number of duds in half), until a permanent solution could be found. Lightweight aluminum alloy (from propellers of Japanese planes shot down during the attack on Pearl Harbor) was machined to take the place of the Mark 6's heavy pin block so inertial forces would be lower. Electrical switches, developed by Johnson, were tried as well. Both fixes worked and were relatively easy to implement. In September 1943, the first torpedoes with new contact pistols were sent to war. "After twenty-one months of war, the three major defects of the Mark 14 torpedo had at last been isolated. ... Each defect had been discovered and fixed in the field—always over the stubborn opposition of the Bureau of Ordnance."

== See also ==
- Magnetic mine
