= USS Parche (SS-384) =

Submarine of the United States

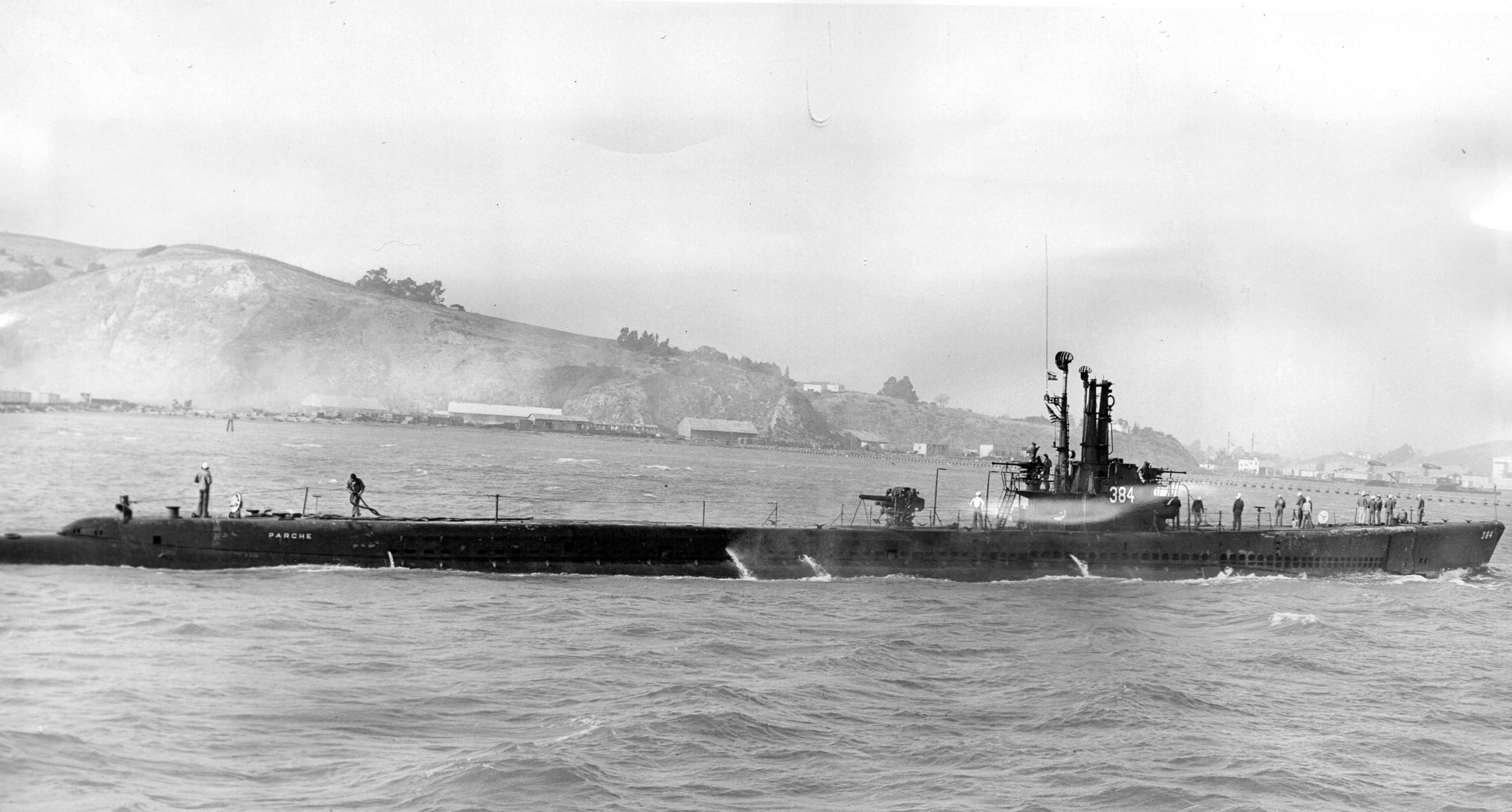
- USS Parche in 1946

History

United States
- Builder: Portsmouth Naval Shipyard, Kittery, Maine
- Laid down: 9 April 1943
- Launched: 24 July 1943
- Commissioned: 20 November 1943
- Decommissioned: 11 December 1946
- Stricken: 8 November 1969
- Fate: Sold for scrap, 18 June 1970

General characteristics
- Class & type: Balao class diesel-electric submarine
- Displacement: 1,526 long tons (1,550 t) surfaced; 2,391 long tons (2,429 t) submerged
- Length: 311 ft 6 in (94.95 m)
- Beam: 27 ft 3 in (8.31 m)
- Draft: 16 ft 10 in (5.13 m) maximum
- Propulsion: 4 × Fairbanks-Morse Model 38D8-⅛ 10-cylinder opposed piston diesel engines driving electrical generators; 2 × 126-cell Sargo batteries; 4 × high-speed Elliott electric motors with reduction gears; two propellers; 5,400 shp (4.0 MW) surfaced; 2,740 shp (2.0 MW) submerged
- Speed: 20.25 knots (38 km/h) surfaced; 8.75 knots (16 km/h) submerged
- Range: 11,000 nautical miles (20,000 km) surfaced at 10 knots (19 km/h)
- Endurance: 48 hours at 2 knots (3.7 km/h) submerged; 75 days on patrol
- Test depth: 400 ft (120 m)
- Complement: 10 officers, 70–71 enlisted
- Armament: 10 × 21-inch (533 mm) torpedo tubes; 6 forward, 4 aft; 24 torpedoes; 1 × 5-inch (127 mm) / 25 caliber deck gun; Bofors 40 mm and Oerlikon 20 mm cannon

The first USS Parche (SS-384/AGSS-384) was a United States Navy submarine. She bore the name (pronounced with two equal syllables: /ˌpɑːrˈtʃeɪ/) of a butterfly fish, Chaetodon capistratus. Parche was a Balao-class submarine that operated in World War II.

== Construction and commissioning ==
Parche was built by the Portsmouth Navy Yard at Kittery, Maine. Her keel was laid on 9 April 1943 and she was christened on 24 July, when her sponsor, Betty Russell, smashed the traditional bottle of champagne across the bow as Parche slid into the water for the first time. Russell was the daughter of U.S. District Court Judge Robert Lee Russell, formerly Judge Advocate General of the U.S. Navy. Parche was commissioned on 20 November 1943 with Commander Lawson P. Ramage commanding.

== First and Second War Patrols ==
On 29 March 1944 the submarine left Pearl Harbor with two other submarines, USS Tinosa (SS-283) and USS Bang (SS-385), for her first war patrol. After passing Midway Atoll, the three reached the sea lanes south of Formosa 16 April 1944. On 29 April Bang reported a large convoy 50 nautical miles (93 km; 58 mi) away, and the wolfpack attacked, Parche sinking one ship.

Tinosa reported a seven-ship convoy on the morning of 3 May and Parche headed north at full speed to intercept. An hour after midnight Parche was in position and scored three torpedo hits on the leading ship and two hits on the second freighter, sinking both. Parche scored two hits on the third freighter, which settled by the stern and began to list to port. Post-war records credited the trio of submarines with five sinkings and 30,542 tons, Parche getting credit for Taiyoku Maru and Shoryu Maru. Parche returned to Midway 23 May 1944, after making a thorough photo reconnaissance of military installations on the island of Ishi Gaki Jima.

Parche's second patrol was again south of Formosa, forming a coordinated attack group with Hammerhead and Steelhead. Parche went to sea 17 June, following her refit. A week later she sighted and sank a patrol vessel with gunfire. On 4 July a Japanese cruiser and destroyer bombarded and depth charged Parche.

Parche sighted a convoy, MI-11, 29 July 1944 and, cooperating with Steelhead, closed in, sinking 4,471-ton cargo ship Manko Maru and 10,238-ton tanker Koei Maru. During this night surface action Parche barely avoided being rammed by one ship. Parche collaborated with Steelhead in sinking an 8,990-ton transport, the Yoshino Maru (originally the Kleist, built in Danzig, 1906 for North German Lloyd, surrendered to the British in 1919, and acquired by the Nippon Yusen Kaisha in 1922). Steelhead sank two other ships, a transport and a cargo vessel. Another tanker and a cargo ship were damaged. For this action Parche received the Presidential Unit Citation and her commander, CDR Lawson P. Ramage (later Vice Admiral), received the Medal of Honor. The attack became known as Ramage's Rampage. On 1 August the sub departed for Saipan where she moored 5 August, arriving Pearl Harbor 16 August.

== Third, Fourth, and Fifth War Patrols ==
On her third war patrol, 10 September to 2 December, one of the longest of the war, Parche did not encounter any targets.

After a refit, the ship got underway 30 December for rotating patrol in the Nansei Shoto. She discovered a freighter and a tanker at anchor in Naze Ko 19 January, firing six bow tubes at the tanker for five distinct hits and four stern tubes at the freighter for two possible hits. On 7 February Parche sighted and sank the 984-ton Okinoyama Maru. Fueling at Midway 16 February, the sub continued to Pearl Harbor, where she arrived 20 February.

Japanese shipping, decimated by continual submarine and air attacks, was becoming increasingly difficult to find. When Parche left Pearl Harbor 19 March 1945, she headed directly for the east coast of Honshū, Japan. Parche sank escorting 615-ton Minesweeper No. 3 off Kobe Zaki 9 April. On 11 April Parche made a gun attack, sinking a small freighter of about 800 tons. She torpedoed another small vessel the next day. On 13 April Parche sank a fishing trawler. Two hours later she again opened fire on a small observation boat, leaving it blazing stem to stern. Two Japanese planes caused her to dive, leaving all her guns loose and much of her ammunition exposed. A heavy explosion shook her on the way down, but inflicted no damage.

On 22 April Parche sighted three small tankers in column, proceeding north along the coast south of Okama Saki. Parche launched three torpedoes at the second tanker and then shifted to the third, which was left down by the stern covered with a cloud of smoke. The sub sailed for Midway, arriving 30 April.

== Sixth War patrol ==
Parche got underway 25 May for her sixth patrol, the last of World War II, joining the "Lifeguard League" south of Honshū. She stayed on station off Honshū until 18 June, ready to pick up any aviators who might be forced down. No rescues were necessary, and on the 18th she proceeded to Tsugara Strait.

Her first torpedo contact came 21 June when she sighted a gunboat rounding Shiriya Saki. The gunboat was soon joined by a sub chaser and then by a freighter. Picking the freighter as the best target, Parche launched four torpedoes from her forward tubes for one hit, which threw up a veil of dense white smoke. Expecting counter-measures, the sub went under, accompanied by the breaking-up noises of freighter Hizen Maru.

Parche attacked three luggers escorted by a small flat vessel on the afternoon of the next day, and sank two. She sank several trawlers by gunfire on 23 June. Two days later she sighted three large ships and six escorts headed north along the coast, one of the most tempting convoys seen for some months in Japanese home waters. After Parche's attack the escorts shook the sub up considerably with depth charges four and a half hours, before she managed to work away and resume her patrol, leaving an ex-Gunboat sunk and another ship badly damaged.

After another round of life guard duty for the carrier planes of Task Force 38, on 17 July, Parche rendezvoused with Cero to take aboard three fliers, and set course for Midway, arriving 23 July, and mooring Pearl Harbor 28 July.

One of the most highly decorated boats of the World War II Pacific Submarine Force, USS Parche made six war patrols, earning five battle stars and one Presidential Unit Citation award for 2 war patrols.

== Post World War II operations ==
After World War II Parche, was assigned to Operation Crossroads as a target ship for the atomic bomb tests at Bikini Atoll. Parche survived both the airburst and the underwater burst, coming through relatively undamaged.

After decontamination, she proceeded to Mare Island Naval Shipyard at Vallejo, California. She was then decommissioned on 10 December 1946 and moved to join the reserve fleet Alameda, California in March 1947. On 1 December 1962 her classification was changed to Auxiliary Submarine, AGSS-384 and assigned as a Naval Reserve Training Submarine in Oakland, California.

Parche's name was stricken from the Navy List on 8 November 1969, and she was sold on 18 June 1970 for scrap. All that remains of her is the original bridge structure, shears, and upper gun from the war which remain enshrined at the Naval Submarine Base Pearl Harbor, and her conning tower barrel, which is on display at USS Bowfin Submarine Museum & Park, Pearl Harbor, Hawaii.
