= Tonan Maru No. 3 =

Japanese whale oil factory ship (1938–1971)

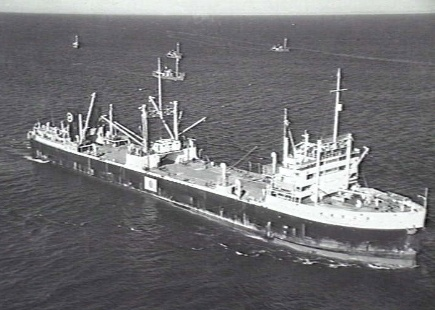
- Pictured on 21 November 1939, with her national markings painted prominently on the side to denote her status as a neutral vessel

History
- Name: Tonan Maru No. 3
- Owner: Nippon Suisan
- Port of registry: (Empire of Japan) Tokyo, Japan
- Builder: Osaka Iron Works
- Launched: 1 May 1938
- Fate: Scrapped in April 1971

General characteristics
- Type: Whale oil factory ship (civilian service); Oiler (military service, 1941-1944)
- Tonnage: 19,625 GRT
- Length: 534.8 feet (163.0 m)
- Beam: 74.9 feet (22.8 m)
- Draught: 36.25 feet (11.05 m)
- Depth: 56.8 feet (17.3 m)
- Installed power: Two oil-fired reciprocal steam engines
- Propulsion: Two screw propellers
- Speed: 14.12 knots (26.15 km/h) (maximum), 12 knots (22 km/h) (service)

Tonan Maru No. 3 (Japanese: 第三図南丸, Dai-san Tonanmaru), from 1951 simply the Tonan Maru, was a Japanese whale oil factory ship. Built at Osaka in 1938 she was the largest merchant ship built in Japan to that point. She carried out whaling in the South Atlantic and in 1941 was blacklisted by the British government, believed to be because she was suspected of refuelling German vessels in the Pacific during the Second World War. Following the Japanese entry into the war Tonan Maru No. 3 was operated as an oil tanker in support of military operations. She survived 11 torpedo hits from USS Tinosa in 1943 as most failed to detonate. Tonan Maru No. 3 was sunk in Chuuk Lagoon by carrier-based aircraft in the 17 February 1944 Operation Hailstone. She was salvaged by Japan after the war, rebuilt and returned to service as the Tonan Maru in 1951. She returned to whaling and was scrapped in 1971.

== Construction and pre-war career ==
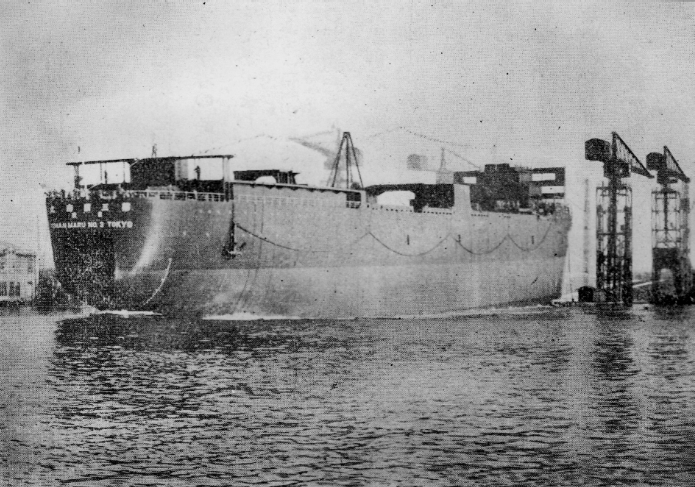
Launch in 1938

Tonan Maru No. 3 was built at Osaka by the Ōsaka Iron Works for Nippon Suisan and was launched on 1 May 1938. She measured 534.8 feet (163.0 m) in length, 74.9 feet (22.8 m) in breadth, 56.8 feet (17.3 m) in depth and 36.25 feet (11.05 m) draught. She was of 19,625 gross register tonnage. She was fitted with two oil-fired reciprocal steam engines, driving two screws, and had a nominal horse power of 500. Tonan Maru No. 3's maximum speed was 14.12 knots (26.15 km/h; 16.25 mph) and her in service speed was 12 knots (22 km/h; 14 mph). She was the largest merchant vessel built in Japan up to that point, though her sister ship Tonan Maru No. 2 exceeded her in tonnage later in her career. To accompany Tonan Maru No. 3 nine whale catching vessels were built alongside her.

Tonan Maru No. 3 entered service as a whale oil factory ship on 23 September 1938. She was registered at Tokyo and sailed under the Japanese civil ensign. She operated alongside Tonan Maru No. 2 in the Southern Atlantic during the 1938-39 whaling season as a mothership to the fleet. The Tonan Maru No. 3 and her attendant catching vessels caught 1,400 whales that season.

== Second World War ==
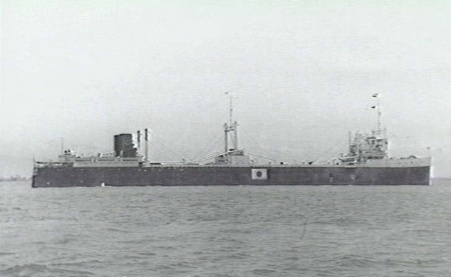
Starboard view, 1939

Japan did not enter the Second World War until December 1941, with its attack on Pearl Harbor. Despite this the British government placed Tonan Maru No. 3 on a blacklist of ships liable to "all disabilities in their power" in May 1941. The meaning of this phrase was not specified but was taken by the contemporary press to mean she was liable to seizure and would be deprived of British shipping insurance, harbour space and refuelling. No reasons were given but it was thought that the British suspected the vessel, and other Japanese tankers, of refuelling German vessels in the Pacific and feared their powerful radios could be used to report on British naval movements. At the time of the blacklisting the Tonan Maru No. 3, one of the largest tanker ships and largest merchant vessels in the world, was en route to Los Angeles. She continued on and loaded 150,000 imperial barrels (25,000,000 L; 5,400,000 imp gal; 6,500,000 US gal) of American oil for transport to Japan.

After the Japanese declaration of war the Tonan Maru No. 3 operated as a tanker in support of Japanese military operations; in this role her gross register tonnage was assessed at 19,209. She was possibly damaged by Dutch submarine K XIV in the Java Sea on 23 December 1941.

On 24 July 1943 she was sighted at a distance of 35,000 yards (32 km; 17 nmi) by Lieutenant Commander Lawrence R. Daspit's submarine USS Tinosa, making 13 knots (24 km/h; 15 mph) and without an escort to the west of Chuuk Lagoon. Daspit closed to 4,000 yards (3.7 km; 2.0 nmi) and fired four torpedoes, two of which struck Tonan Maru No. 3's stern and exploded. The vessel was stopped dead in the water and Daspit closed to what he considered an ideal range and position, 875 yards (800 m; 0.432 nmi) directly abeam of the tanker. Daspit launched three consecutive torpedoes from this position which all hit but failed to explode. He then ordered the remaining torpedoes inspected and his crew could find no fault with them. Daspit fired a further six torpedoes which all hit but failed to explode. He returned to port with his final torpedo, intending to have it inspected by engineers at the dockyard. The Tonan Maru No. 3 remained afloat and was salvaged and returned to service with the assistance of Japanese vessels operating from Chuuk. The US Navy discovered, through further tests, that the firing pins on their Mark 14 torpedoes failed to detonate when launched from a direct abeam position. New contact detonators were devised as a result of the incident.

Tonan Maru No. 3 was sunk by US carrier-based aircraft on 17 February 1944 whilst positioned at 7°23′N 151°51′E in the Chuuk Lagoon. She was one of 30 Japanese ships sunk in Operation Hailstone, a raid of Chuuk by aircraft from the USS Bunker Hill, Enterprise, Essex, Intrepid and Yorktown.

== Salvage and later career ==
Japan sought and received special permission to raise Tonan Maru No. 3 after the war as she was extremely valuable to the whaling fleet. She was refloated by a large number of lifting buoys on 3 March 1951 and towed to Japan. She was rebuilt over a period of six months and put back into service as a whale oil factory ship, re-entering service on 8 October 1951 under the name Tonan Maru. She served in the whaling fleet until 1968, becoming the longest-serving Japanese factory ship. Tonan Maru was scrapped in April 1971. Her aft portion and funnel, which had been blown off during the attack, were located in the lagoon, at a depth of 110 feet (34 m), on 5 January 1981.
