= USS Steelhead =

Submarine of the United States

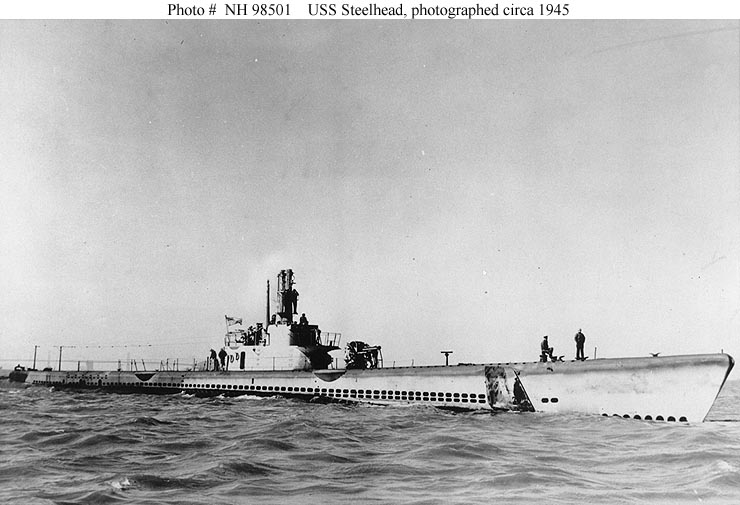
- Steelhead (SS-280) c. 1945.(Image retouched by wartime censors to remove radar antennas atop periscope sheers.)

History

United States
- Builder: Portsmouth Naval Shipyard, Kittery, Maine
- Laid down: 1 June 1942
- Launched: 11 September 1942
- Commissioned: 7 December 1942
- Decommissioned: 29 June 1946
- Stricken: 1 April 1960
- Fate: Sold for scrap, 21 December 1960

General characteristics
- Class & type: Gato-class diesel-electric submarine
- Displacement: 1,525 tons (1,549 t) surfaced; 2,424 tons (2,460 t) submerged
- Length: 311 ft 9 in (95.02 m)
- Beam: 27 ft 3 in (8.31 m)
- Draft: 17 ft 0 in (5.18 m) maximum
- Propulsion: 4 × Fairbanks-Morse Model 38D8-⅛ 9-cylinder opposed piston diesel engines driving electrical generators; 2 × 126-cell Sargo batteries; 4 × high-speed General Electric electric motors with reduction gears; two propellers; 5,400 shp (4.0 MW) surfaced; 2,740 shp (2.0 MW) submerged
- Speed: 21 knots (39 km/h) surfaced; 9 knots (17 km/h) submerged
- Range: 11,000 NM (20,000 km) surfaced at 10 knots (19 km/h)
- Endurance: 48 hours at 2 knots (3.7 km/h) submerged; 75 days on patrol
- Test depth: 300 ft (90 m)
- Complement: 6 officers, 54 enlisted
- Armament: 10 × 21-inch (533 mm) torpedo tubes; 6 forward, 4 aft; 24 torpedoes; 1 × 3-inch (76 mm) / 50 caliber deck gun; Bofors 40 mm and Oerlikon 20 mm cannon

USS Steelhead (SS-280), a Gato-class submarine, was a ship of the United States Navy named for the steelhead, a North American trout found from California to Alaska.

Steelhead (SS-280) was laid down on 1 June 1942 by the Portsmouth Naval Shipyard in Kittery, Maine; launched on 11 September 1942; sponsored by Mrs. Marguerite Brown; and commissioned on 7 December 1942.

== First war patrol, April – June 1943 ==
Steelhead held her shakedown off Long Island in December 1942 and January 1943. In February, she sailed for the Pacific and arrived at Pearl Harbor on 8 April. After intensive training, she sailed for Midway Island; topped off her fuel there on 25 April, and began her first war patrol. She planted 12 mines off the Japanese mainland near Erimo Saki and then bombarded a steel plant and iron foundry near Muroran, Hokkaidō. She fired no torpedoes, and the submarine returned to Midway in early June.

== Second war patrol, June – August 1943 ==
On her second patrol, 30 June to 6 August, Steelhead fired 10 torpedoes at a Japanese task force on 10 July. Explosions were heard, but specific damage could not be ascertained. After refitting at Pearl Harbor, the ship sailed on 13 September for the Gilbert Islands where she operated as a lifeguard submarine off Tarawa during bombardment by Army aircraft.

She called at Johnston Island for fuel and provisions and departed on 25 September to resume her patrol which took her into the Palau Islands. On 6 October off the Carolines, she damaged tanker Kazalhaya, which Tinosa (SS-283) sank later that day. All her torpedoes expended, Steelhead sighted a large convoy which she trailed, while sending information to other submarines in the area.

== Third, fourth, and fifth war patrols, December 1943 – August 1944 ==
On her next patrol, Steelhead operated off Bungo Suido from late December 1943 to early March 1944. On 10 January 1944, she torpedoed and sank the 6,795 ton converted salvage vessel, Yamabiko Maru.

Her fourth patrol, off Formosa from early April to 23 May, provided no targets worthy of torpedo fire, but she sank a trawler by gunfire.

On 17 June, she sortied from Midway Island with Hammerhead (SS-364) and Parche (SS-384) to patrol south of Formosa. On 31 July, the submarine made three successful attacks in which one ship was damaged and two were sunk. Parche also sank two from the convoy. Upon concluding the patrol when she arrived at Pearl Harbor on 16 August, Steelhead was routed to the West Coast for a much needed overhaul.

For his services in that last patrol Whelchel, a grandson of Confederate Lieutenant General James Longstreet, was awarded the Silver Star.

== Sixth war patrol, April – August 1945 ==
While in drydock, on 1 October 1944 Steelhead suffered a serious fire which required the installation of a new conning tower. After a long repair period, the submarine stood out of San Francisco on 16 April 1945, en route to Pearl Harbor. Steelhead began her last war patrol on 13 May. She performed lifeguard duty in the Caroline Islands and later patrolled in the Tokyo Bay area. She made no torpedo attacks but sank two trawlers by gunfire. The patrol ended at Midway Island on 5 August and, 20 days later, she sailed for the West Coast.

Steelhead arrived at San Francisco on 5 September 1945 and provided services for the West Coast Sonar School until 2 January 1946. She sailed to Pearl Harbor and operated from there until March when she steamed back to San Francisco for inactivation. The submarine was placed in reserve, out of commission, on 29 June 1946 and attached to the Pacific Reserve Fleet. In May 1947, Steelhead was placed in service, in reserve, and used as a reserve training ship until struck from the Navy List on 1 April 1960.

Steelhead received six battle stars for World War II service.
