= USS Tinosa (SS-283) =

Submarine of the United States

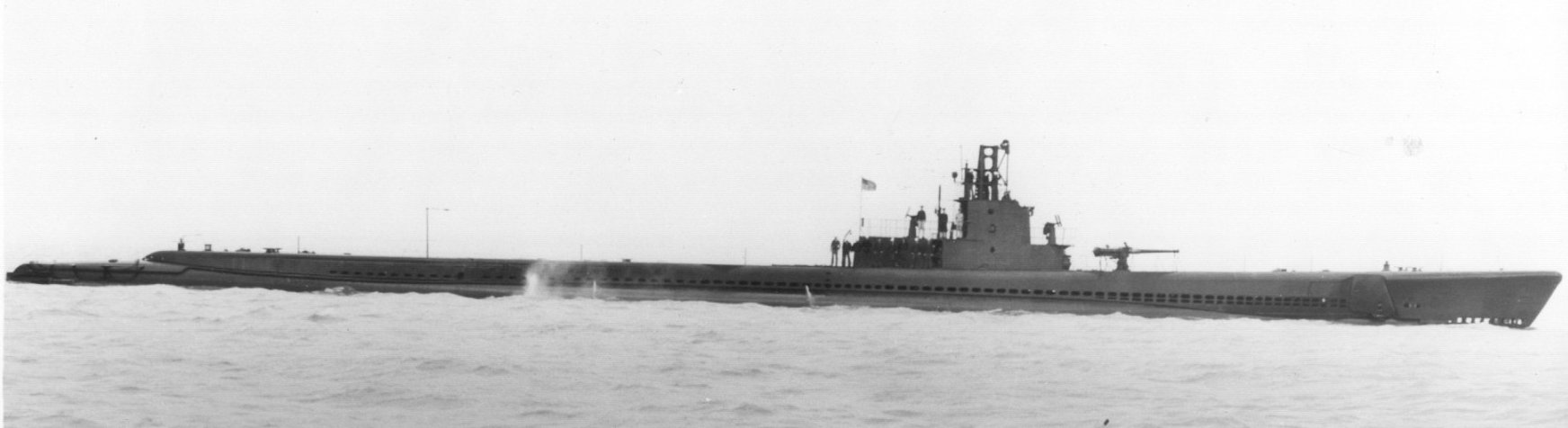
- Tinosa (SS-283), broadside view, c. 1944.

History

United States
- Builder: Mare Island Naval Shipyard
- Laid down: 21 February 1942
- Launched: 7 October 1942
- Commissioned: 15 January 1943
- Decommissioned: 23 June 1949
- Recommissioned: 4 January 1952
- Decommissioned: 2 December 1953
- Stricken: 1 September 1958
- Fate: Scuttled off Hawaii November 1960 after being used as an anti-submarine warfare target

General characteristics
- Class & type: Gato-class diesel-electric submarine
- Displacement: 1,525 tons (1,549 t) surfaced; 2,424 tons (2,460 t) submerged
- Length: 311 ft 9 in (95.02 m)
- Beam: 27 ft 3 in (8.31 m)
- Draft: 17 ft 0 in (5.18 m) maximum
- Propulsion: 4 × Fairbanks-Morse Model 38D8-⅛ 9-cylinder opposed piston diesel engines driving electrical generators; 2 × 126-cell Sargo batteries; 4 × high-speed General Electric electric motors with reduction gears; two propellers; 5,400 shp (4.0 MW) surfaced; 2,740 shp (2.0 MW) submerged
- Speed: 21 knots (39 km/h) surfaced; 9 knots (17 km/h) submerged
- Range: 11,000 NM (20,000 km) surfaced at 10 knots (19 km/h)
- Endurance: 48 hours at 2 knots (3.7 km/h) submerged; 75 days on patrol
- Test depth: 300 ft (90 m)
- Complement: 6 officers, 54 enlisted
- Armament: 10 × 21-inch (533 mm) torpedo tubes; 6 forward, 4 aft; 24 torpedoes; 1 × 3-inch (76 mm) / 50 caliber deck gun; Bofors 40 mm and Oerlikon 20 mm cannon

USS Tinosa (SS-283), a Gato-class submarine, was the first ship of the United States Navy to be named for the tinosa.

== Construction ==
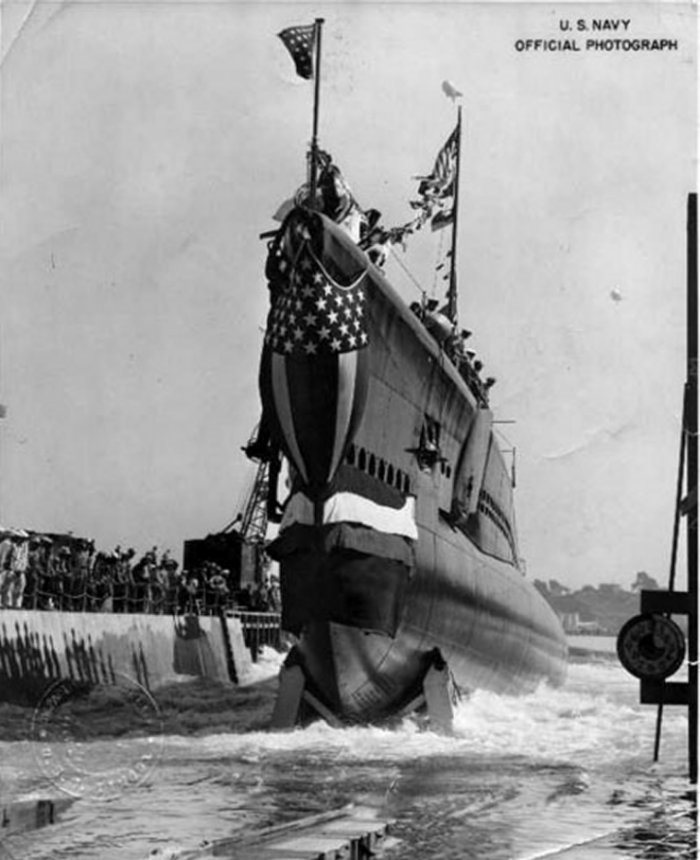
Tinosa (SS-283) launched at Mare Island Navy Yard, 7 October 1942.

The Tinosa was laid down on 21 February 1942 at Vallejo, California, by the Mare Island Navy Yard; launched on 7 October 1942; sponsored by Mrs. Katharine Shanks Malloy, wife of Captain William E. Malloy; and commissioned on 15 January 1943, Lt. Comdr. Lawrence Randall Daspit in command.

== Operations during World War II ==
After preliminary operations, the submarine proceeded to Hawaii, arriving at Pearl Harbor on 16 April 1943. Over the next two years, she completed twelve war patrols in the Pacific and was credited with sinking 16 enemy ships, totaling 64,655 tons.

=== First and second patrols, May–August 1943 ===
On her first war patrol, conducted from 3 May to 19 June 1943, Tinosa damaged three enemy ships in the waters east of Kyūshū, Japan, while sustaining some depth-charge damage herself.

After refitting at Midway, she got underway on 7 July to patrol the sea routes between Borneo and Truk. On 24 July 1943, Tinosa encountered the cargo ship Tonan Maru No. 3, the largest tanker of the Japanese fleet, 19,262 tons, sailing from Palau to Truk. Codebreaker warning had put Tinosa in a perfect position to shoot the tanker with a spread of four torpedoes. None exploded. The boat's commanding officer, Lieutenant Commander L. R. (Dan) Daspit recorded in his log, "Target had been carefully tracked and with spread used [torpedoes] could not have run properly and missed."

Tinosa made herself a second chance by chasing throughout the following day. Daspit also checked the torpedoes he had left and insured that the magnetic influence exploders had been disabled (see below for why). Even so, the first two torpedoes of the second attack had to be shot at an awkward angle and range. They hit and exploded disabling Tonan Maru's engines. With the target dead in the water Tinosa was in an ideal firing position, moving in to fire on the tanker at the submarine equivalent of point blank range. The torpedo appeared to hit its target but did not explode. Daspit and crew continued to fire torpedoes one at a time at the tanker. All of them hit, but none exploded. Daspit's log gives time of firing of each and states over and over again "fired [nth] torpedo. Hit. No apparent effect." Daspit recorded about the sixth one since Tonan Maru had become a "sitting duck", "... Hit. No apparent effect. This torpedo hit well aft on the port side, made splash at the side of the ship and was then observed to have taken a right turn and to jump clear of the water about 100 feet (30 m) from the stern of the tanker. I find it hard to convince myself that I saw this."

He took his sub to the other side of the target and fired the eighth and ninth torpedoes even as he saw a destroyer approaching from the east. As Tinosa went deep they heard the last torpedo hit and stop running. Daspit recorded in his log, "No explosion. Had already decided to retain one torpedo for examination by base." After shooting nine torpedoes at a sitting duck over almost an hour and a half 1009 to 1131, and taking time out to examine the fish in the torpedo room between shots, Lieutenant Commander Daspit took Tinosa back to Pearl Harbor with the single remaining weapon.

Daspit stormed into SUBPAC's office. He had shot 15 torpedoes at Tonan Maru over two days and only 2 of them had worked. The others shot under ideal conditions failed to explode. Rear Admiral Lockwood, COMSUBPAC wrote: "I expected a torrent of cusswords, damning me, the Bureau of Ordnance, the Newport Torpedo Station and the Base Torpedo Shop, and I couldn’t have blamed him – 19,000 ton tankers don’t grow on trees. I think Dan was so furious as to be practically speechless. His tale was almost unbelievable, but the evidence was undeniable." When, upon inspection, nothing obvious was found wrong with that last torpedo, Commander Swede Momsen suggested conducting tests on actual warshots by firing them against the cliffs of Kahoolawe, a small island south of Maui from the submarine USS Muskallunge. The first two exploded. The third one did not. Within a few days the cause was traced to a firing pin that was mounted athwart-ships such that when the torpedo hit a target dead-on (ninety degree track angle) the deceleration forces slowed the pin's motion in its bearings and its spring could not move it fast enough to set off the explosive train. A glancing blow, however, would result in the proper behavior (which is why Daspit's first two torpedoes, fired at less optimum track angle, did explode).

Two solutions were worked on. One involved recycling a very light metal alloy that had been melted down from the engine of a Japanese airplane that had crashed on Oahu during the bombing of Pearl Harbor. Both solutions were installed into torpedoes and the submarine force had a mostly reliable weapon 21 months after the war started.

This was the third strike for the Mark 14 torpedo. It started with the USS Sargo missing 13 of 13 easy shots in December 1941. Finally in June 1942, Admiral Lockwood, the Commander of Submarines South West Pacific (COMSUBSOWESPAC), arranged to have torpedoes – with special non-exploding warheads (but unlike the exercise heads of that time and later they were filled to make them just as heavy as the actually explosive-filled warheads) – shot at fishnets. They were set to run at 10 feet (3 m). 850 yards (780 m) away they went through the nets at 25 feet (8 m) depth. The Bureau of Ordnance (BUORD) wouldn't accept this until they were forced to face the facts and conduct their own experiment. They confirmed Lockwood's experiments on 1 August.

But that was not the end. In April 1943 BUORD admitted that the magnetic influence exploder was susceptible to premature explosions. Even then it wasn't until 24 July when Admiral Nimitz ordered that the influence exploders be disabled on all Pacific Fleet submarines. This did not apply, however, to COMSUBSOWESPAC. Admiral Christie then in command had been the officer in charge of testing the super secret influence exploder in the 1930s and he just could not give up on the concept and he ordered that his boats continue to use the defective magnetic exploder.

This set the stage for Dan Daspit, USS Tinosa and the Tonan Maru to show that the contact exploder was defective as well, as described above.

=== Third patrol, September–October 1943 ===
Tinosa next departed Pearl Harbor on 23 September. Near the Carolines on 6 October, Tinosa sighted a lone tanker. In a midday torpedo attack, she damaged the ship; then dove to 150 feet (46 m). Four depth charges exploded nearby, springing open lockers and knocking men off their feet in the aft torpedo room. Moments later, a fire broke out in the motor room but was brought under control. Throughout the afternoon, Tinosa and Steelhead (SS-280) continued to harass the tanker until evening, when their target went down.

At sunset on 6 October, Tinosa bombarded a radio station on Alet Island, near Truk. She ended the patrol at Midway on 16 October.

=== Fourth patrol, October–December 1943 ===
Departing Midway on 27 October, Tinosa headed for the Palau-Truk sea lanes. On 22 November, she sighted two cargo ships and two small escort craft steaming in convoy. The submarine fired six torpedoes, scoring hits on both cargo ships. The entire action took only five minutes and left her between two mortally stricken ships, her position clearly marked by torpedo wakes leading out ahead and astern—a perfect fix for the enemy escorts. Amid the sounds of the cargo vessels breaking up, Tinosa dove deep to avoid the certain counter-attack of the escort vessels. A short time later, four depth charges exploded close by the submarine, knocking out her planes, gyro, steering, internal communications, and other equipment. She made a wild climb to 250 feet (76 m), then dove to 380 feet (120 m), before her crew regained control. Tinosa then resumed evasive tactics which enabled her to elude the remnants of the convoy late in the afternoon.

During an attack on a convoy on 26 November, Tinosa sank Japanese cargo ship Shini Maru and then dodged 34 depth charges, none of which caused her any damage. She emerged from this encounter with a torpedo stuck in her number 5 tube but managed to remedy the problem and headed for the Molucca Passage-Palau traffic lanes.

On 3 December, she sighted a large passenger-cargo vessel, the Azuma Maru, protected by a single escort. At 18:20, Tinosa launched a torpedo attack, damaging the Japanese ship. At 21:01 while maneuvering on the surface as she sought to finish off the Azuma Maru, Tinosa came under fire from the burning vessel; and, minutes later, she narrowly avoided being rammed by the crippled enemy ship which circled out of control because of a damaged rudder. At 21:20, Tinosa fired three more torpedoes, and the Azuma Maru sank. She concluded this patrol at Fremantle, Australia, on 16 December 1943.

=== Fifth patrol, January–March 1944 ===
After sailing on 10 January 1944 for the South China Sea, Tinosa landed an intelligence team and its supplies at Labian Point, North Borneo, under cover of darkness on 20 January, before proceeding to the Flores Sea. Two days later, she sank Koshin Maru and Seinan Maru and damaged a third ship in a running attack on a convoy off Viper Shoal. In another action on the night of 15 February – 16 February, Tinosa drew gunfire from the ships of a convoy as she torpedoed and sank Odatsuki Maru and Chojo Maru. She ended her fifth patrol at Pearl Harbor on 4 March 1944.

=== Sixth patrol, March–May 1944 ===
In company with Parche (SS-384) and Bang (SS-385), Tinosa got underway for the East China Sea and her sixth patrol on 29 March. Operating off Japan and the Ryukyus, this wolf pack preyed successfully on passing convoys by stationing units along well-traveled routes. The submarines made six major attacks on this patrol. Tinosa herself sank two Japanese cargo ships, Taibu Maru and Toyohi Maru, in a night attack on 4 May. On this patrol, she also sank a trawler with her 4-inch (100 mm) gun on 9 May and claimed to have damaged three other vessels. The submarine arrived at Majuro on 15 May.

=== Seventh patrol, June–August 1944 ===
After refitting, Tinosa departed the Marshalls on 7 June, bound for the East China Sea. On 18 June, she resorted to unusual tactics in attacking a three-masted 400-ton fishing sampan which had withstood her gunfire. Tinosa closed the enemy vessel, doused her with fuel oil, and set her ablaze by tossing flaming, oil-soaked rags on her deck. Shortly after dawn on 2 July, Japanese planes and patrol vessels forced Tinosa to go deep near Nagasaki and kept her down until dusk. The following day, the submarine sank two passenger-cargo ships in an attack on a convoy, adding Konsan Maru and Kamo Maru to her list of kills. Following this patrol, Tinosa reported to Hunters Point Naval Shipyard, California, on 7 August, for a much needed overhaul.

=== Eighth and ninth patrols, November 1944 – April 1945 ===
Tinosa departed San Diego on 7 November 1944 and proceeded, via Pearl Harbor, to Nansei Shoto to reconnoiter its waters and to test new FM sonar equipment in locating Japanese mines. After 58 days at sea, Tinosa returned to Pearl Harbor.

On 17 March 1945, Tinosa got underway from Tanapag Harbor in the Marshalls. Despite unexplained damage in her bow-plane rigging gear, Tinosa proceeded to the Nansei Shoto area and resumed testing the mine-detecting capabilities of her temperamental FM sonar. She also observed Japanese shipping and took reconnaissance photographs before ending the patrol at Apra Harbor, Guam, on 7 April.

=== Tenth patrol, April–May 1945 ===
On 28 April, Tinosa headed for Truk. Her FM sonar equipment—which she had received while at Guam—improved her sonar range, and she gathered data on sonar performance throughout the voyage. On 3 May, she narrowly escaped damage from bombs dropped by an enemy airplane off Moen Island.

Although there was no opportunity to attack enemy shipping during this patrol, Tinosa bombarded a Japanese installation on Ulul Island on the night of 14 May. She also made numerous photographs which she turned over to intelligence officers upon her arrival at Guam on 16 May.

=== Eleventh and twelfth patrols, May–August 1945 ===
Tinosa got underway for the Sea of Japan on 29 May. En route, she rescued 10 survivors of a ditched B-29. Acting on this special mission as a member of a wolf pack selected to initiate Operation Barney, an incursion into the Sea of Japan, Tinosa accomplished the dangerous task of plotting mines in Tsushima Strait on 6 June. This patrol is dramatized in the 1950s TV series, The Silent Service, produced by Universal Television and hosted by RADM Thomas M Dykers, USN (Ret).

Following the completion of this special mission, Tinosa made six aggressive torpedo attacks, sank three cargo ships, and—during the daylight hours of 12 June—launched a brilliant surface battle against the Keito Maru, a Japanese sea truck. Having sunk four Japanese vessels and damaged a fifth, she completed her 11th patrol arriving at Pearl Harbor on 4 July.

After refitting, Tinosa set course for her 12th patrol on 11 August. Before she reached her assigned area this patrol was terminated by Japan's capitulation. On 26 August 1945, she departed Midway for an overhaul at San Francisco. After operating off the West Coast from January to June 1946, she was placed in reserve. In January 1947, Tinosa was placed out of commission.

== Second period in commission, 1952–53 ==
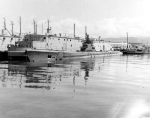
Portside view of Tinosa (SS-283), probably laid up in the Pacific Reserve Fleet, Mare Island Group, after she was decommissioned, 2 December 1953.

The Korean War precipitated her recommissioning in January 1952. However, she was decommissioned on 2 December 1953, and her name was struck from the Navy List on 1 September 1958. The use of her hull for experimental and training purposes was authorized on 2 March 1959. She was used as an ASW target, then scuttled off Hawaii in November 1960.

== Commendations ==
- Presidential Unit Citation for her fourth, fifth, and sixth war patrols
- Asiatic-Pacific Campaign Medal with nine battle stars
- World War II Victory Medal
- National Defense Service Medal
