= USS Grunion =

Submarine of the United States

Coordinates: 52°14′16″N 177°25′5″E

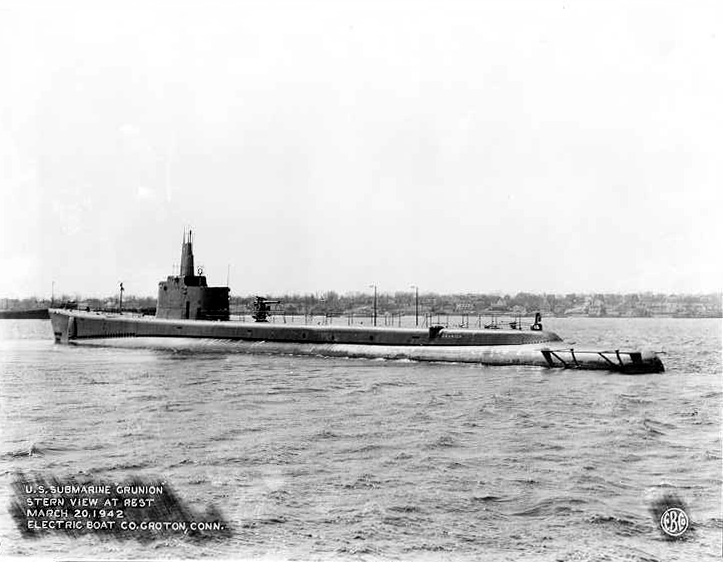
- USS Grunion (SS-216) off the Electric Boat Company, Groton, Connecticut, on 20 March 1942.

History

United States
- Builder: Electric Boat Company, Groton, Connecticut
- Laid down: 1 March 1941
- Launched: 22 December 1941
- Sponsored by: Stanford C. Hooper
- Commissioned: 11 April 1942
- Stricken: 2 November 1942
- Fate: Sunk off of Kiska around 30 July 1942, due to accidents caused/related to circular run of own torpedo

General characteristics
- Class & type: Gato-class Diesel–electric submarine
- Displacement: 1,525 long tons (1,549 t) surfaced; 2,424 long tons (2,463 t) submerged
- Length: 311 ft 9 in (95.02 m)
- Beam: 27 ft 3 in (8.31 m)
- Draft: 17 ft (5.2 m) maximum
- Propulsion: 4 × General Motors Model 16-248 V16 Diesel engines driving electric generators; 2 × 126-cell Sargo batteries; 4 × high-speed General Electric electric motors with reduction gears; two propellers; 5,400 shp (4.0 MW) surfaced; 2,740 shp (2.0 MW) submerged
- Speed: 21 kn (39 km/h) surfaced; 9 kn (17 km/h) submerged
- Range: 11,000 nautical miles (20,000 km) surfaced at 10 kn (19 km/h)
- Endurance: 48 hours at 2 kn (3.7 km/h) submerged; 75 days on patrol
- Test depth: 300 ft (91 m)
- Complement: 6 officers, 64 enlisted
- Armament: 10 × 21-inch (533 mm) torpedo tubes; 6 forward, 4 aft; 24 torpedoes; 1 × 3-inch (76 mm) / 50 caliber deck gun; Bofors 40 mm and Oerlikon 20 mm cannon

USS Grunion (SS-216) was a Gato-class submarine that sank at Kiska, Alaska, during World War II. She was the only ship of the United States Navy to be named after the grunion.

== Construction and commissioning ==
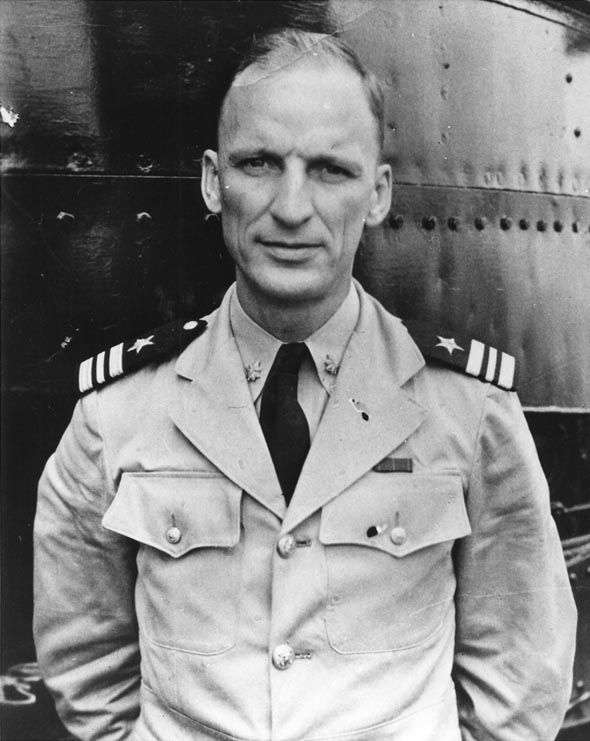
Lieutenant Commander Mannert L. Abele, commander of the USS Grunion

Grunion′s keel was laid down by the Electric Boat Company in Groton, Connecticut, on 1 March 1941. She was launched on 22 December 1941, sponsored by Mrs. Stanford C. Hooper, wife of Rear Admiral Stanford Caldwell Hooper, and commissioned on 11 April 1942 with Lieutenant Commander Mannert L. Abele, USNA class of 1926, in command.

== Service history ==
After shakedown from New London, Connecticut, Grunion sailed for the Pacific on 24 May. A week later, as she transited the Caribbean Sea for Panama, she rescued 16 survivors of the USAT Jack, which had been torpedoed by the German U-boat U-558, and conducted a fruitless search for 13 other survivors presumed to be in the vicinity. Arriving at Coco Solo on 3 June, Grunion landed the survivors and continued on to Pearl Harbor, arriving on 20 June.

Departing Hawaii on 30 June after 10 days of intensive training, Grunion touched Midway Atoll in the Northwestern Hawaiian Islands before heading toward the Aleutian Islands for her first war patrol. Her first report, made as she patrolled north of Kiska Island, stated she had been attacked by a Japanese destroyer and had fired Mark 14 torpedoes at her with inconclusive results. She operated off Kiska throughout July and sank two Japanese submarine chasers (CH-25 and CH-27) as she waited for enemy shipping. On 30 July, the submarine reported intensive antisubmarine activity and was ordered back to Dutch Harbor.

On 31 July, the Japanese merchant ship Kano Maru was attacked by multiple torpedoes near Kiska. One damaged the stern of the ship, but the others missed or were duds. The ship's crew spotted a submarine conning tower and opened fire with machine guns and an 8 cm deck gun. One shell was observed to land on the submarine followed by an explosion and wreckage. The Kano Maru reported the attack by radio, but its transmission was not received. The ship limped to Kiska, where it was sunk at anchor in a US air attack on 8 August.

Grunion was never heard from again. Air searches off Kiska were fruitless, and on 5 October, Grunion was reported overdue from patrol and assumed lost with all hands. Her name was stricken from the Naval Vessel Register on 2 November 1942. Captured Japanese records show no antisubmarine attacks in the Kiska area, and the fate of Grunion remained a mystery for 65 years, until the discovery in the Bering Sea in August 2007 of a wreck believed to be her. In October 2008, the U.S. Navy verified that the wreck is Grunion.

== Honors and awards ==
- Asiatic-Pacific Campaign Medal with one battle star for World War II service.

== Finding Grunion ==
In 1998, Lieutenant Colonel Richard Lane purchased for $1 a wiring diagram from a Japanese cargo ship, Kano Maru, which had been active during World War II. Hoping to authenticate the document, Lane posted it on a Japanese naval historical website, asking if anyone could help. He was contacted by Yutaka Iwasaki, a Japanese naval historian, who not only authenticated it, but also suggested he knew what happened to Grunion. Lane contacted ComSubPac, and its public affairs officer, Darrel Ames, posted the information on ComSubPac's Grunion website.

When Grunion disappeared in 1942, her captain, Lieutenant Commander Abele, left behind three sons. For nearly 65 years, they had been searching for information about the loss of their father's boat.

When the Abele brothers encountered the post, they contacted Yutaka Iwasaki. He sent them a translation of an article written by the officer who had commanded the merchant ship Kano Maru. The article described an encounter with a submarine near Kiska Island in the Aleutians about the time Grunion was reported missing.

Several years later, John Abele, cofounder of Boston Scientific, met Robert Ballard, famous for discovering the wreck of the RMS Titanic. Ballard gave him advice on how to locate a shipwreck, and Abele decided to fund an expedition to find the lost submarine Grunion.

In 2006, Williamson Associates, using side-scan sonar, located a promising target almost at the exact location indicated by the commander of Kano Maru. The sunken object had many characteristics typical of a submarine. In 2007, using a remotely operated underwater vehicle, DSSI/Oceaneering, returned to the site and took video recordings of the imploded remains of a submarine, which had markings in English, and propeller guards and limber holes identical to those of Grunion. The following year, the U.S. Navy confirmed that the find was Grunion.

Although not absolutely certain, the evidence strongly suggests that Grunion was lost as a result of multiple torpedo failures during her encounter with Kano Maru. Her first torpedo ran low, but despite its magnetic pistol, it failed to detonate. Two more bounced harmlessly off Kano Maru without exploding. However, the remaining torpedo missed its target and circled back, striking the periscope supports on the submerged submarine without exploding. The damage the torpedo inflicted, combined with a jammed rear dive plane, triggered a sequence of events that caused the loss of depth control. Grunion plunged below her maximum operational depth and at about 1,000 feet (300 m) would have imploded. What remained of the ship struck the seabed, breaking off about 50 feet (15 m) of her bow. The wreckage then slid two-thirds of a nautical mile (0.77 mi; 1.2 km) down the side of an extinct volcano, coming to rest on a notch in the underwater mountain.

In 2019, the missing bow section was located one-quarter of a nautical mile (0.29 mi; 0.46 km) from the rest of the submarine on a slope of an underwater volcano at a depth over 2,000 feet (610 m).
