= Mark 14 torpedo =

US torpedo of WWII

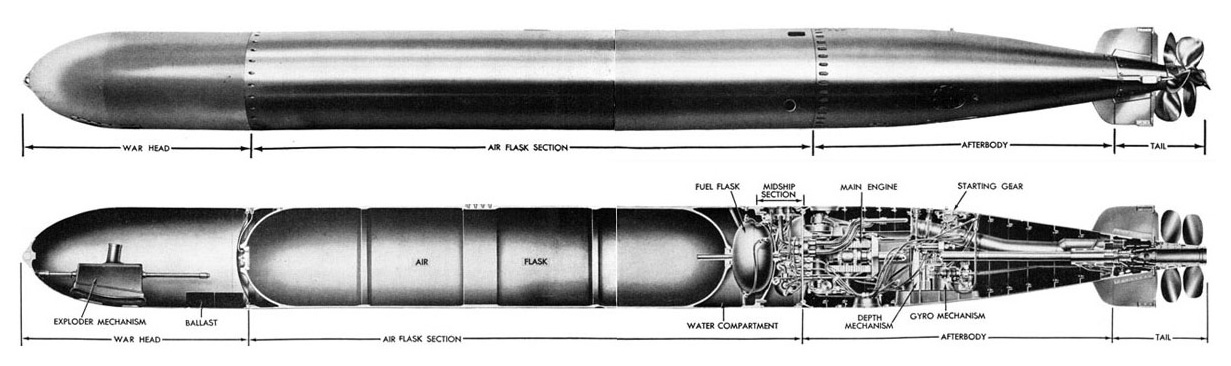
- Mark 14 torpedo side view and interior mechanisms, as published in a service manual
- Type: Anti-surface ship torpedo
- Place of origin: United States

Service history
- In service: 1931–1980
- Used by: United States Navy
- Wars: World War II

Production history
- Designer: Naval Torpedo Station Newport, Rhode Island
- Designed: 1931
- Manufacturer: Naval Torpedo Station Newport, RI; Naval Torpedo Station Alexandria, VA; Naval Torpedo Station Keyport, Washington; Naval Ordnance Plant Forest Park, IL
- Produced: 1942-1945
- No. built: 13,000

Specifications
- Mass: Mod.0: 3,000 lb (1,361 kg) Mod.3: 3,061 lb (1,388 kg)
- Length: 20 ft 6 in (6.25 m)
- Diameter: 21 in (530 mm)
- Effective firing range: 4,500 yards (4,100 m) at 46 knots (85 km/h); 9,000 yards (8,200 m) at 31 knots (57 km/h)
- Warhead: Mod.0 TNT Mod.3 Torpex
- Warhead weight: Mod.0: 507 lb (230 kg) Mod.3: 643 lb (292 kg)
- Detonation mechanism: Contact or magnetic pistol
- Engine: Wet-heater combustion / steam turbine with compressed air tank
- Propellant: 180 proof ethanol blended with methanol or other denaturants
- Maximum speed: 46 knots (85 km/h)
- Guidance system: Gyroscope
- Launch platform: Submarines

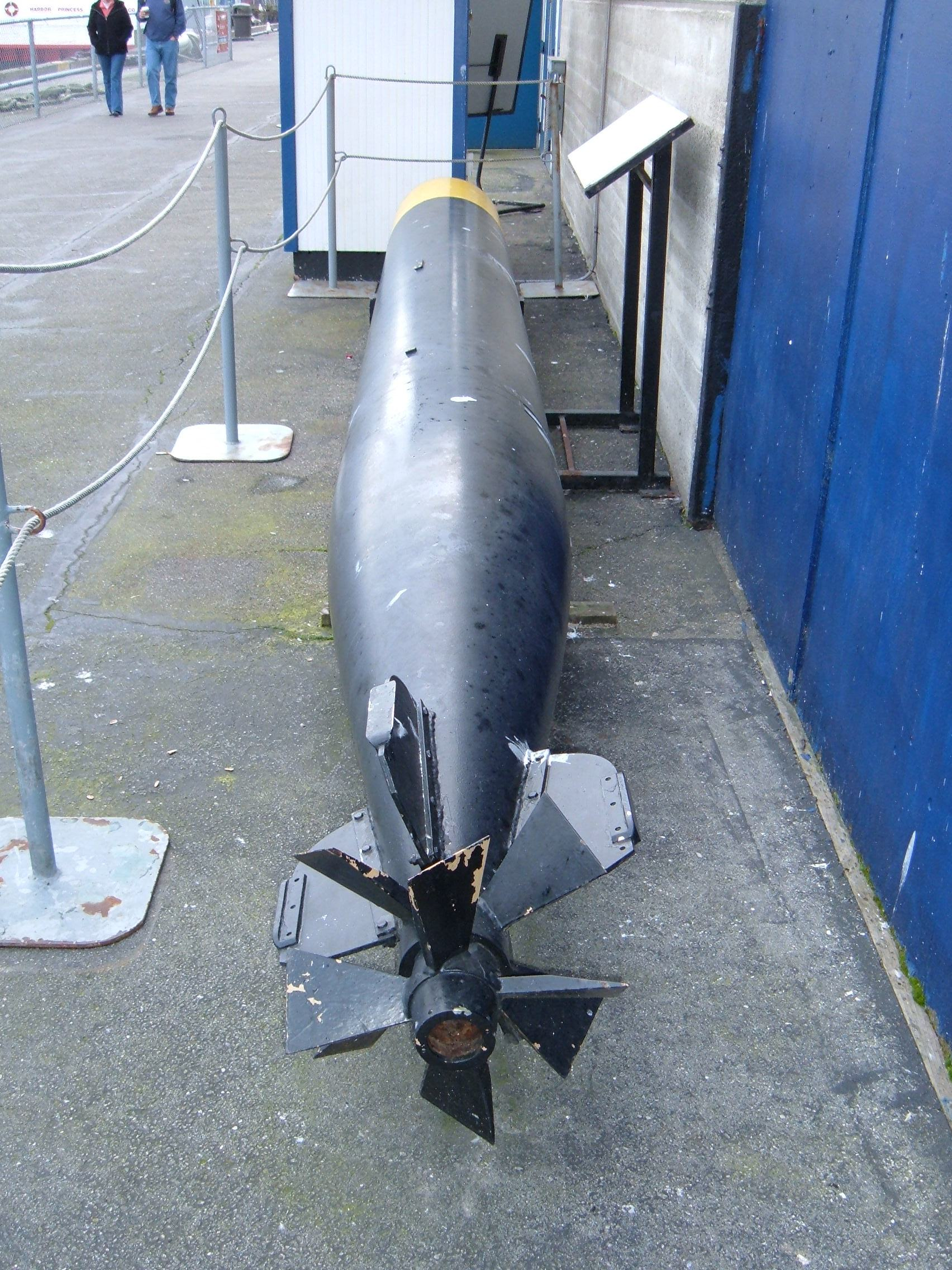
A Mark 14 torpedo on display at Fisherman's Wharf in San Francisco

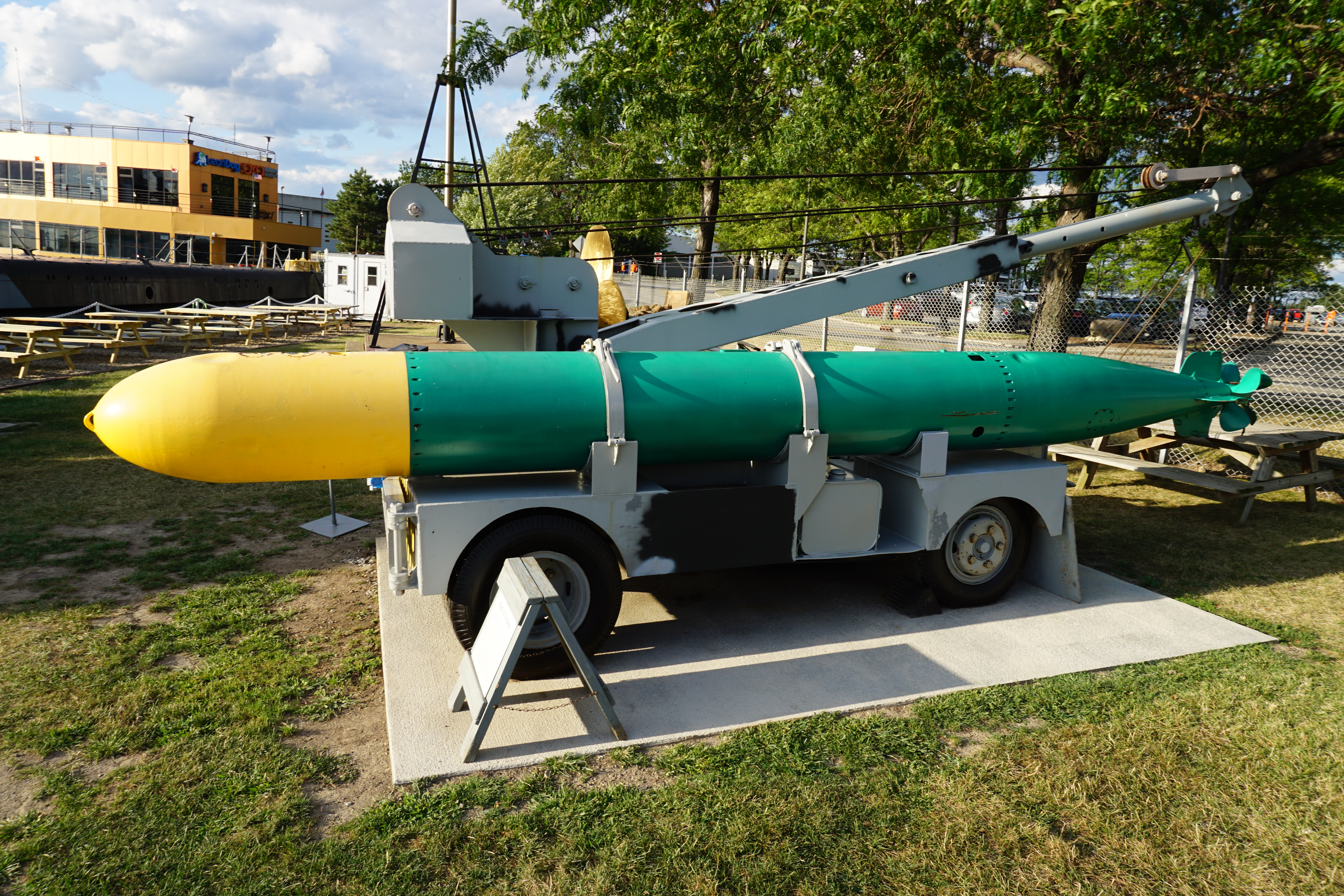
A Mark 14 torpedo on display in Cleveland, near USS Cod

The Mark 14 torpedo was the United States Navy's standard submarine-launched anti-ship torpedo of World War II. This weapon was plagued with many problems which crippled its performance early in the war. It was supplemented by the Mark 18 electric torpedo in the last two years of the war. From December 1941 to November 1943 the Mark 14 and the destroyer-launched Mark 15 torpedo had numerous technical problems that took almost two years to fix. After the fixes, the Mark 14 played a major role in the devastating blow U.S. Navy submarines dealt to the Japanese naval and merchant marine forces during the Pacific War.

By the end of World War II, the Mark 14 torpedo was a reliable weapon ultimately remaining in service for almost 40 years in the U.S. Navy, and even longer with other navies.

== Development ==
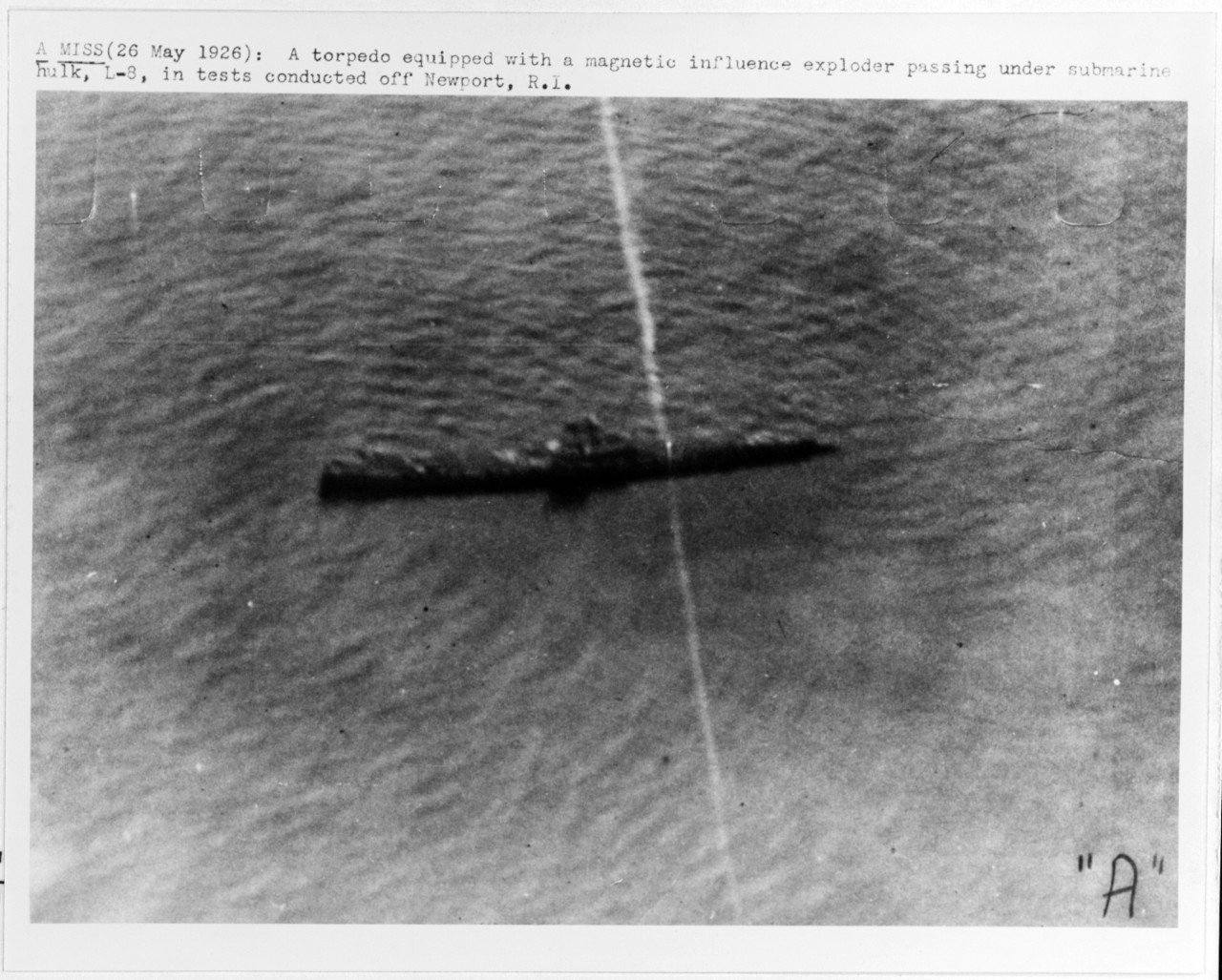
The only live fire test of the magnetic influence exploder before the war occurred in 1926. In this picture of the first shot, the Mark 10 torpedo with the experimental exploder ran underneath the target without exploding. The second test shot exploded under the target submarine and sank it. Although the Navy conducted other tests, those tests were nondestructive: the torpedoes would not be damaged by the tests.

The design of the Mark 14 started in January 1931; the Navy allocated $143,000 for its development. The Mark 14 was to serve in the new "fleet" submarines and replace the Mark 10 which had been in service since World War I and was standard in the older R- and S-boats. Although the same diameter, the Mark 14 was longer, at 20 ft 6 in (6.25 m), and therefore incompatible with older submarines' 15 ft 3 in (4.65 m) torpedo tubes. Later in the war, the Bureau of Ordnance (BuOrd) stopped producing Mark 10s for the S-boats and provided a shortened Mark 14.

Torpedoes consist of several subsystems, and those subsystems evolved over time. Torpedoes are also tailored for their application. Submarine torpedoes, such as the Mark 14, are constrained by the dimensions of the submarine's torpedo tubes: 21 inches in diameter and a certain maximum length. Submarines are expected to close with their targets, so the torpedoes do not need a long range. In contrast, torpedoes fired by destroyers need greater range because their approach would be under fire from their targets. Improvements in the propulsion engine power output allowed the Mark 14 to have a top speed of 46 knots (85 km/h) compared to the Mark 10 Mod 0's 30 knots (56 km/h). Steering is controlled by a gyroscope; the gyro on the Mark 10 Mod 0 was spun up in the torpedo tube and was not powered after launch; the gyro on the Mark 14 was continuously powered by its air flask. The depth control on the Mark 10 was slow — the depth would not stabilize quickly; the Mark 14 depth stabilization was improved.

The design for the Mark 6 exploder used in the Mark 14 torpedo had started at the Naval Torpedo Station (NTS), Newport, in 1922. Ship armor was improving with innovations such as torpedo belts and torpedo blisters (bulges). To circumvent these measures, torpedoes needed larger warheads or new technology. One option would use a fairly small warhead but was intended to explode beneath the keel where there was no armor. This technology required the sophisticated new Mark 6 magnetic influence exploder, which was similar to the British Duplex and German models, all inspired by German magnetic mines of World War I. The Mark 14 shared this exploder with the concurrently-designed surface ship Mark 15 torpedo.

The Mark 6 exploder, designated Project G53, was developed "behind the tightest veil of secrecy the Navy had ever created." Exploders were tested at the Newport lab and in a small field test aboard USS Raleigh. At Ralph Christie's urging, equatorial tests were later conducted with USS Indianapolis, which fired one hundred trial shots between 10°N and 10°S and collected 7000 readings. The tests were done using torpedoes with instrumented exercise heads: an electric eye would take an upward-looking picture from the torpedo; the magnetic influence feature would set off some gun cotton. Inexplicably, no live fire trials were ever done with production units. Chief of Naval Operations William V. Pratt offered the hulk of O'Brien-class destroyer Ericsson, but prohibited the use of a live warhead, and insisted the BuOrd pay the cost of refloating her if she was sunk in error. These were strange restrictions, as Ericsson was due to be scrapped. BuOrd declined. A service manual for the exploder "was written—but, for security reasons, not printed—and locked in a safe."

Torpedoes were sophisticated and expensive. The cost of a torpedo in 1931 was about $10,000 (equivalent to $212,000 in 2025). The development of the Mark 13, Mark 14 and Mark 15 torpedoes was done frugally. The Navy did not want to do live fire tests that would destroy a $10,000 torpedo. The Navy was also reluctant to supply target ships. Consequently, there were no live-fire tests, and the designers had to rely on their judgment. This sometimes led to problems: a contact exploder that worked reliably at 30 knots (56 km/h) failed at 46 knots (85 km/h). In addition, the Navy had limited experience in using torpedoes in combat.

== Supply and production ==
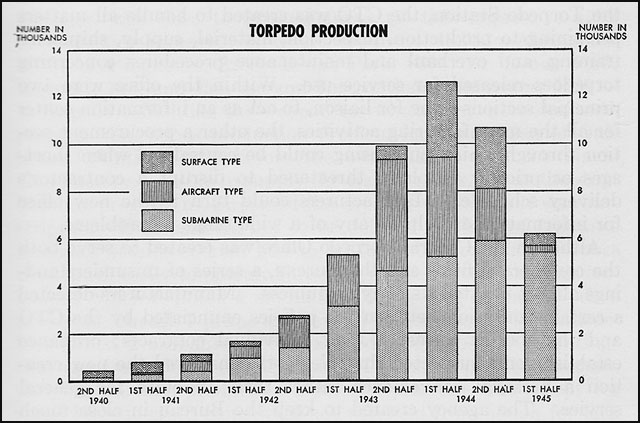
United States torpedo production during World War II

The U.S. Navy has a long history of torpedo supply problems. In 1907, the Navy knew there was a problem with torpedo supply; a major contractor, the E. W. Bliss Company, could produce only 250 torpedoes per year. During World War I, the Navy had almost 300 destroyers that each had 12 torpedo tubes. The Bliss Company was to produce about 1,000 torpedoes for the Navy, but that production was delayed by demands for artillery shells and only 20 torpedoes were close to being shipped before WWI started for the U.S. When war was declared on Germany, another 2,000 torpedoes were ordered. To produce large numbers of torpedoes, the government loaned $2 million to Bliss Company so it could build a new factory. Although the government had ordered 5,901 torpedoes, only 401 had been delivered by July 1918. The supply problems prompted the Navy to build the U.S. Naval Torpedo Station, Alexandria, VA, but WWI ended before the plant was built. The plant produced torpedoes for five years, but was shuttered in 1923.

In 1923, Congress made NTS Newport the sole designer, developer, builder and tester of torpedoes in the United States. No independent or competing group was assigned to verify the results of Mark 14 tests.

The Navy had not learned from the torpedo supply lessons of WWI. Looking back in 1953, the Bureau of Ordnance stated, "Production planning in the prewar years was also faulty. Torpedoes were designed for meticulous, small-scale manufacture. When military requirements demanded that they be supplied in large numbers, a series of new problems was exposed. There were simply no realistic plans available for providing the weapon in adequate quantity." There was little interest in torpedo production until 1933 when the Vinson Shipbuilding Program recognized the need for torpedoes to fill the torpedo tubes on its newly constructed ships. Consequently, Newport received new production equipment and an increased budget. NTS produced only 1½ torpedoes a day in 1937, despite having three shifts of three thousand workers working around the clock. Production facilities were at capacity and there was no room for expansion.

By January 1938, unfilled torpedo orders at Newport amounted to $29,000,000. A forecast that did not include war estimated Newport would have a backlog of 2425 torpedoes by 1 July 1942. More production was needed. The simplest route was to reopen the Alexandria Torpedo Station, but New England congressmen objected to reopening Alexandria; they wanted production concentrated in New England. The Navy side-stepped the opposition by including the Alexandria funds as part of the Naval Gun Factory's 1939 budget. The Naval Torpedo Station at Keyport, Washington, was also expanded.

"Although torpedo production was still low—3 a day—when the national emergency was proclaimed in September 1939, an investment of almost $7,000,000 assured early improvement." By the fall of 1941, Alexandria had been reopened. The required production rate for torpedoes was raised to 50 per day. Both Newport and Alexandria went to 3 shifts operating 7 days per week, but their combined torpedo production was 23 torpedoes per day. The Navy contracted with the American Can Company to produce torpedoes.

The short supply of Mark 14 torpedoes was compounded by a 10 December 1941 Japanese air raid on Cavite Navy Yard in the Philippines. The attack destroyed 233 Mark 14 torpedoes.

After the U.S. entered the war, the contract with American Can was expanded and Pontiac Motor Company, International Harvester, E. W. Bliss Company, and Precision Manufacturing Co. were retained as contractors. In May 1942, Westinghouse Electric Corporation was asked to build an electric torpedo (which became the Mark 18 torpedo).

Only 2,000 submarine torpedoes were built by all three Navy factories (Newport, Alexandria, and Keyport) during 1942. This exacerbated torpedo shortages; the Pacific Fleet Submarine Force had fired 1,442 torpedoes since war began. In the words of BuOrd's own account of WWII, "Until the spring of 1945, supply was a problem" for the Mark 14 torpedo.

The torpedo shortage at the start of the war also meant that commanders did not want to waste torpedoes on testing.

== Controversy ==
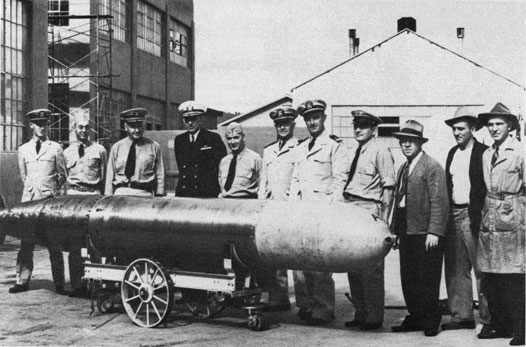
Captain Theodore Westfall, NTS CO and Captain Carl Bushnell of the Bureau of Ordnance, inspect a Mark 14 torpedo at the Naval Torpedo Station, Keyport, Washington, 1943

The Mark 14 was central to the torpedo scandal of the U.S. Pacific Fleet Submarine Force during World War II. Inadequate production planning led to severe shortages of the weapon. The frugal, Depression-era, peacetime testing of both the torpedo and its exploder was woefully inadequate and had not uncovered many serious design problems. Torpedoes were so expensive that the Navy was unwilling to perform tests that would destroy a torpedo. Furthermore, the design defects tended to mask each other. Much of the blame commonly attached to the Mark 14 correctly belongs to the Mark 6 exploder. These defects, in the course of fully twenty months of war, were exposed, as torpedo after torpedo either missed by running directly under the target, prematurely exploded, or struck targets with textbook right angle hits (sometimes with an audible clang) yet failed to explode.

Responsibility lies with the Bureau of Ordnance, which specified an unrealistically rigid magnetic exploder sensitivity setting and oversaw the feeble testing program. Its small budget did not permit live fire tests against real targets. Instead, any torpedo that ran under the target was presumed to be a hit due to the magnetic influence exploder, which was never actually tested. Therefore, additional responsibility must also be assigned to the United States Congress, which cut critical funding to the Navy during the interwar years, and to NTS, which inadequately performed the very few tests made. The Bureau of Ordnance failed to assign a second naval facility for testing, and failed to give Newport adequate direction.

== Problems ==
The Mark 14 torpedo had four major flaws.

- It tended to run about 10 feet (3 m) deeper than set.
- The magnetic exploder often caused premature detonation.
- The contact exploder often failed to detonate the warhead.
- It tended to run "circular", failing to straighten its run once set on its prescribed gyro-angle setting, and instead, to run in a large circle, thus returning to strike the firing ship.

Some of these flaws had the unfortunate property of masking or explaining other flaws. Skippers would fire torpedoes and expect the magnetic influence exploder to sink the target ship. When the torpedoes did not explode, they started to believe the magnetic influence exploder did not work. Against orders, some submariners disabled the magnetic influence feature of the Mark 6 exploder, suspecting it was faulty, and went for contact exploder hits; such efforts would confuse the issues. Looking back in 1953, the BuOrd speculated, "Many shots planned for impact against the side of a ship missed because of deep running, yet damaged the enemy due to the magnetic influence feature of the Mark 6." When later tests discovered the torpedoes ran deeper than set, the submarine command then believed that the torpedoes ran so deeply that the magnetic influence exploder could not sense the target ship; that the failure to explode had been due entirely to the depth setting and that nothing was wrong with the magnetic influence exploder. When the depth issue was fixed, the magnetic influence exploder's premature detonation made it seem like the exploder was working but little damage would be done to the target ship. It was only after the magnetic influence feature was deactivated that problems with the contact exploder would be discernible.

=== Running too deep ===
On 24 December 1941, during a war patrol, Commander Tyrell D. Jacobs in Sargo fired eight torpedoes at two different ships with no results. When two additional merchantmen came in view, Jacobs took extra care to set up his torpedo shots. He pursued the targets for fifty-seven minutes and made certain the TDC bearings matched perfectly before firing two torpedoes at each ship from an average range of 1,000 yd (910 m). The shots should have hit, but all failed to explode.

A few days later, he discovered the torpedoes were running too deep, and corrected the problem, Jacobs detected a big, slow tanker. Again, his approach was meticulous, firing one torpedo at a close range of 1,200 yd (1,100 m). It missed. Exasperated, Jacobs broke radio silence to question the Mark 14's reliability.

A similar experience happened to Pete Ferrall in Seadragon, who fired eight torpedoes for only one hit and began to suspect the Mark 14 was faulty.

==== Lockwood's depth tests ====
Shortly after replacing John E. Wilkes as Commander of Southwest Pacific submarines in Fremantle, Western Australia, newly minted Rear Admiral Charles A. Lockwood ordered a net test at Frenchman Bay, Albany on 20 June 1942. Eight hundred torpedoes had already been fired in combat, more than a year's production from NTS.

Jim Coe's Skipjack fired a single torpedo with an exercise head from a distance of 850 yards (780 m). Despite being set for a depth of 10 ft (3 m), the torpedo pierced the net at a depth of 25 ft (7.6 m). James Fife, Jr. (formerly Chief of Staff to COMSUBAS Wilkes, whom Lockwood was replacing) followed up the next day with two more test shots; Fife concluded the torpedoes ran an average 11 ft (3.4 m) deeper than the depth at which they were set. BuOrd was not amused. Neither was the CNO, Admiral Ernest J. King, who "lit a blowtorch under the Bureau of Ordnance". The fact that destroyers' Mark 15s were suffering the same failures may have had something to do with it as well. On 1 August 1942, BuOrd finally conceded the Mark 14 ran deep, and six weeks later, "that its depth-control mechanism had been 'improperly designed and tested'".

==== Depth explanation ====
The Mark 14 torpedo tended to run some 10 feet (3 m) too deep for several reasons. The first was that it was tested with an exercise warhead that was more buoyant than the tactical warshot warhead; that was a precaution made to avoid losing an expensive torpedo. A light exercise head made the torpedo positively buoyant, so it would float to the surface at the end of its run. The live warhead contained more mass, so it reached equilibrium at a lower depth. Also, the depth mechanism was designed prior to the warhead's explosive charge being increased, making the torpedo even heavier overall. "Testing conditions became more and more unrealistic, obscuring the effect of the heavier warhead on depth performance." Furthermore, the depth testing device used by NTS to verify the torpedo's running depth (the depth and roll recorder) had the same measuring port placement error as the Mark 14's depth control port, so both were off by the same amount in the same direction and gave the impression that the torpedo was running at the desired depth when it was actually much deeper. After hearing of the deep-running torpedo problem, most submarine skippers simply set their torpedoes' running depth to zero, which risked the torpedo broaching the surface.

Torpedo depth is a control problem; good depth control requires more than just measuring the torpedo's depth. A depth control system that used just depth (measured by a hydrostat) to control the elevators would tend to oscillate around the desired depth. Whitehead in Fiume supplied many of the world's navies, and it had trouble with depth control until it developed the "balance chamber" with pendulum (pendulum-and-hydrostat control). The balance chamber had water pressure push against a disk that was balanced by a spring. "The inclusion of a pendulum stabilized the mechanism's feedback loop." This development (known as "The Secret") was around 1868.

Depth control in early torpedoes such as the Mark 10 had been done with a pendulum mechanism that limited the torpedo to shallow pitches of less than 1 degree. The shallow angle meant that it could take a long time for a torpedo to stabilize at its desired depth. For example, to change depth by 30 feet (9 m) on a 1° slope takes a horizontal run of about 1,800 feet (550 m). The improved Uhlan mechanism (Uhlan gear) for depth control had much faster depth stabilization and had been introduced in the Mark 11 torpedo.

When the Uhlan gear was incorporated in the Mark 14 design, the pressure sensing port for the depth mechanism was moved from its position on the cylindrical body to the cone-shaped tail section; the designers did not realize that move would affect the pressure readings. This repositioning meant that when the torpedo was moving, a hydrodynamic flow effect created a substantially lower pressure at the port than hydrostatic depth pressure. The torpedo's depth control engine therefore thought the torpedo was at too shallow a depth and responded by trimming the torpedo to run deeper. A simple laboratory test (such as immersing a non-moving torpedo in a pool of static water) would not be subject to the flow-induced pressure change and would show the torpedo trimmed at the desired depth. Dynamic tests using exercise heads with depth and roll recorders would have shown the depth problem, but the depth measuring port suffered from the same placement problem and gave consistent (though incorrect) measurements. The problem was also exacerbated by higher speeds. The depth problem was finally addressed in the last half of 1943 by relocating the sensor point to the midbody of the torpedo where hydrodynamic effects were minimized.

=== Magnetic influence exploder and premature explosions ===
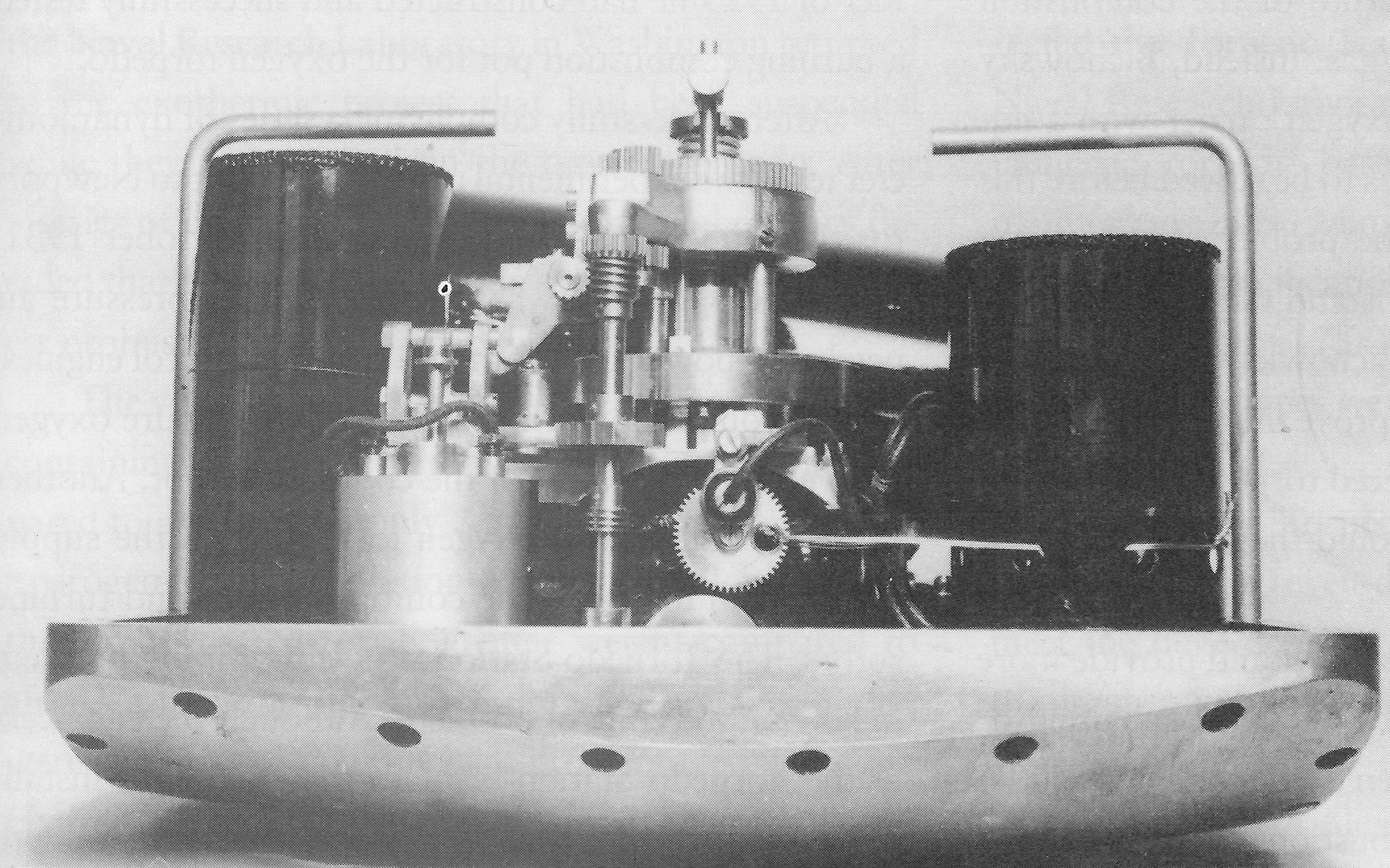
Mark 6 Mod 1 exploder used early in the war. Later on it was replaced with the Mark 6 Mod 5.

By August 1942, the faulty running depth situation was resolved, and submarines were getting more hits with the Mark 14. However, curing the deep-running problem caused more prematures and duds even as more hits were being achieved. The number of sinkings did not rise.

The deep running torpedoes would explain many warshot misses: a torpedo running too deeply under the target would not allow the magnetic influence exploder to detect the target. Getting the torpedoes to run at the correct depth would presumably fix the problem of the torpedoes failing to explode. This explanation satisfied Lockwood and Robert H. English (then COMSUBPAC), who both refused to believe the exploder could also be defective. In August 1942, the submarine commands believed mistakenly that the torpedo reliability problem was solved.

The skippers, however, continued to report problems with the Mark 14. Suspicion about the magnetic influence exploder grew.

Lieutenant Commander John A. Scott in Tunny on 9 April 1943 found himself in an ideal position to attack aircraft carriers Hiyō, Junyo, and Taiyo. From only 880 yd (800 m), he fired all ten tubes, hearing all four stern shots and three of the bow's six explode. No enemy carrier was seen to diminish its speed, though Taiyo was slightly damaged in the attack. Much later, intelligence reported each of the seven explosions had been premature; the torpedoes had run true but the magnetic feature had triggered and exploded the warheads too early.

On 10 April, USS Pompano attacked Japanese aircraft carrier Shōkaku by firing six torpedoes. There were at least three premature explosions, and the aircraft carrier was not damaged.

On 10 April 1943, Bureau of Ordnance Chief Admiral Blandy wrote Lockwood that the Mark 14 was likely to explode prematurely at shallow depths. Blandy recommended that the magnetic influence feature be disabled if torpedoes were fired for contact hits.

BuOrd also concluded that the Mark 14's arming distance of 450 yards (410 m) was too short; an arming distance of 700 yards (640 m) would be needed for most torpedoes to stabilize their course and depth. BuOrd also believed the Mark 6 magnetic influence feature was less effective below 30°N latitude and did not recommend its use below 30°S latitude.

On 8 May 1943, Lockwood made a list of torpedo failures gleaned from ULTRA intercepts.

On 10 June 1943, USS Trigger fired six torpedoes from 1,200 yards (1,100 m) at the aircraft carrier Hiyō. Two torpedoes missed, one exploded prematurely, one was a dud, and two hit. The carrier was damaged but made it home.

Many submarine commanders in the first two years of the war reported explosions of the warhead with little to no damage of the enemy. The magnetic exploders were triggering prematurely, before getting close enough to the vessel to destroy it. Earth's magnetic field near NTS, where the trials (limited as they were) were conducted, differed from the areas where the fighting was taking place.

Submarine skippers believed that about 10 percent of their torpedoes prematurely exploded; BuOrd statistics had the premature explosions at 2 percent.

==== Deactivation ====
At Pearl Harbor, despite nearly all his skippers' suspicions about the torpedoes, Rear Admiral Thomas Withers, Jr. refused to deactivate the torpedo's Mark 6 exploder, arguing torpedo shortages stemming from inadequate production at NTS made it impossible. As a result, his men did it on their own, doctoring their patrol reports and overstating the size of ships to justify using more torpedoes.

Only in May 1943, after the most famous skipper in the Sub Force, Dudley W. "Mush" Morton, returned having failed to inflict any damage, did Lockwood, Commander Submarine Force Pacific (COMSUBPAC), accept the Mark 6 should be deactivated. It took a commander of Morton's stature to challenge the Navy senior command and move them into action, even at the risk of Morton's career.

Nonetheless, Lockwood waited to see if BuOrd commander Admiral William "Spike" Blandy might yet find a fix for the problem. The BuOrd sent an expert to Surabaja to investigate, who set the gyro backwards on one of Sargo's trial torpedoes; the potentially deadly setting, guaranteed to cause erratic running, was corrected by torpedo officer Doug Rhymes. Though he found nothing wrong with maintenance or procedures, the expert submitted a report laying all the blame on the crew. In late June 1943, Lockwood (by then COMSUBPAC) asked Commander-in-Chief of the Pacific Fleet (CINCPAC) Chester Nimitz for permission to deactivate the magnetic exploders. The next day, 24 June 1943, CINCPAC ordered all of his submarines to deactivate the magnetic exploder.

Rear Admiral Ralph Waldo Christie, who had been involved in the development of the magnetic influence exploder, was now commander of the Australian-based submarines in the South West Pacific Area and not in Nimitz' chain of command. Christie insisted his area's submarines continue to use the magnetic exploder. At the end of 1943, Admiral Thomas C. Kinkaid replaced Admiral Arthur S. Carpender as Commander Allied Naval Forces South West Pacific Area (Christie's boss) and ordered Christie to deactivate the magnetic influence exploder.

==== Premature explosion explanation ====
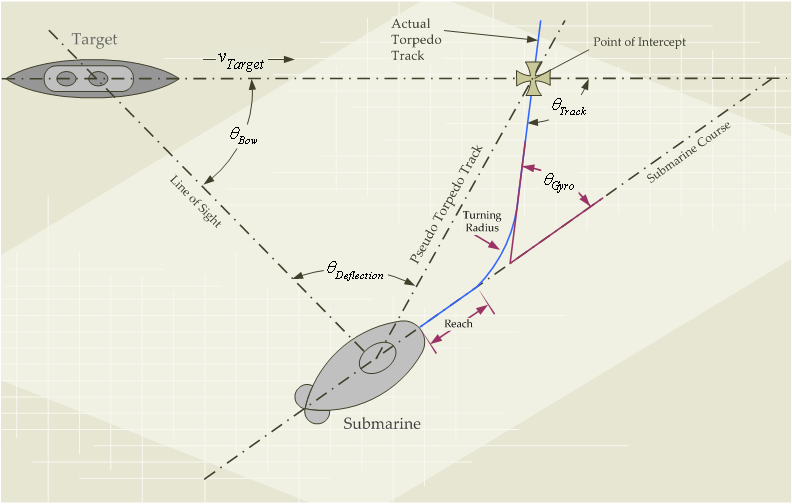
A torpedo may take a long time before it settles on its final course. If the torpedo direction is still changing when the torpedo arms, it may set off the magnetic influence exploder.

In 1939, before the war started for the U.S., BuOrd knew the magnetic influence exploder was suffering from unexplained premature detonations:

Evidence of that fact came in 1939, when Newport reported to the Bureau that the exploder was giving unexplained prematures. Admiral Furlong arranged for a physicist to visit the station and investigate the failures. For approximately a week, the scientist and his assistants worked with the device. Four sources of prematures were uncovered. Even more significant, the investigator reported to the Bureau that the responsible engineers at Newport were not employing proper tests on the Mark 6. Corrective steps were ordered by the Chief, but subsequent events proved that the remedial action, like the original tests, was inadequate.

There were two common types of premature explosions. In the first, the warhead exploded just as it armed. These premature explosions were easily discerned by the submarine because the torpedo exploded before it had a chance to reach its target. In the second, the warhead exploded just before reaching the target ship but far enough away that it did no damage. The skipper, looking through the periscope, could see the torpedo run right to the ship and see the explosion; the crew could hear the high order explosion. Everything would look OK except that the target ship would get away with little or no damage. Sometimes the submarine command would hear about these premature explosions from intercepted enemy communications.

Both premature explosion types could result from the magnetic influence exploder. If a torpedo was still turning to get on course or had not stabilized its depth when the warhead armed, the exploder could see a magnetic field change and detonate. As the warhead approached the target, it could sense a change due to the ship's effect on the earth's magnetic field. That's a desired effect if the torpedo is set to run under the ship, but not a desirable effect when the torpedo is set to hit the side of the ship.

Another explanation for early premature explosions was electrical failure due to leaking gaskets.

The second type of premature explosion masked contact exploder failures. Skippers firing the torpedo for a contact exploder hit on the side of the target would see an explosion and believe the contact exploder worked, but the explosions were triggered not by the contact feature, but rather by the magnetic influence feature at a distance far enough from the hull to cause little or no damage.

=== Contact exploder ===
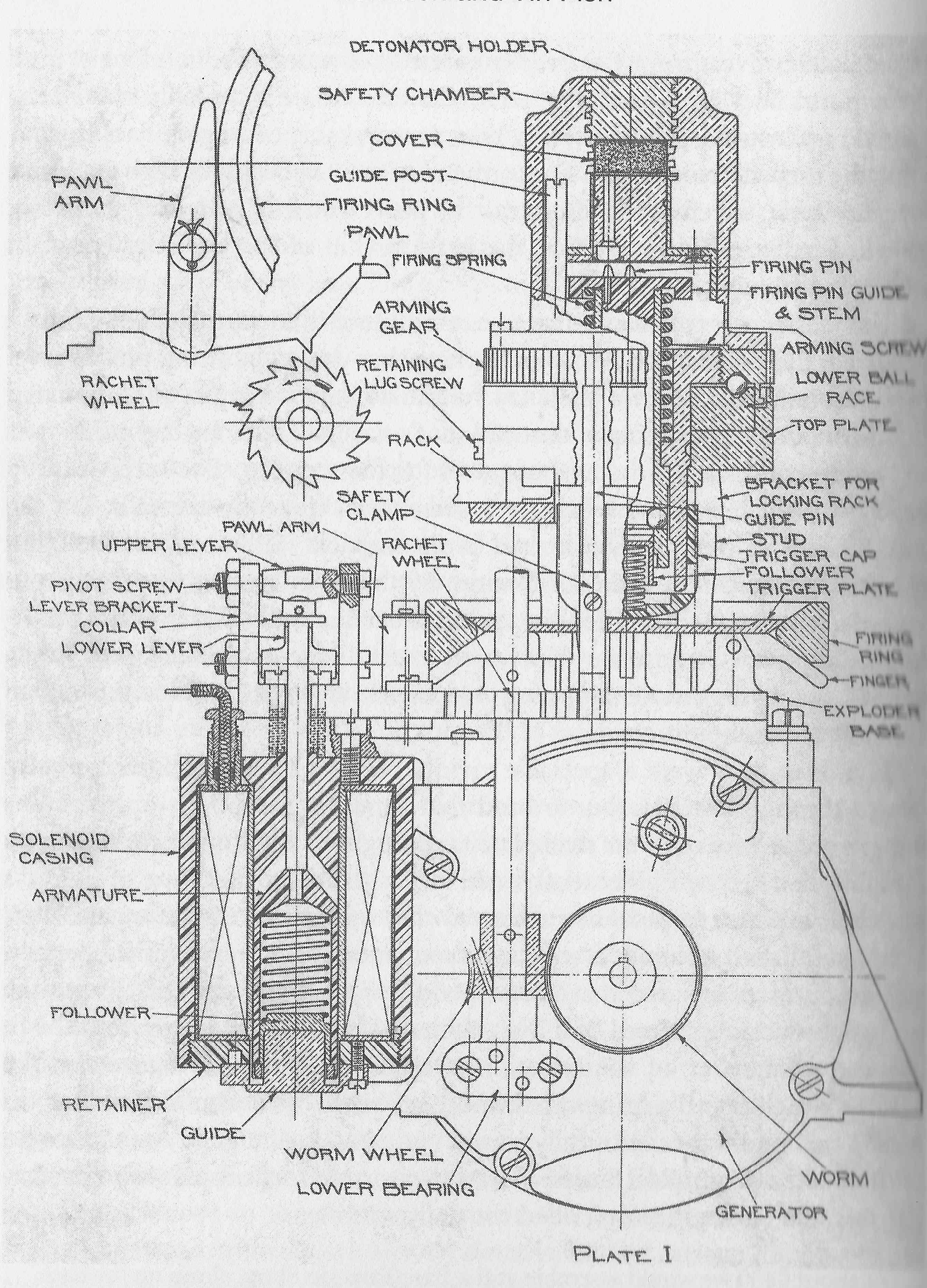
Detail of Mark 6 exploder. For contact operation, the collision of the torpedo with the target ship would move the firing ring and release the firing pin stem. The firing pin stem would then move vertically (powered by the firing spring) and detonate the tetryl booster charge. The mechanism worked for low-speed torpedoes, but for the high-speed Mark 14 torpedo, the same impact deceleration that caused the firing ring to move was also large enough to cause the firing pin stem to bind and fail to detonate the booster.

Inactivation of the magnetic influence feature stopped all the premature explosions.

Early reports of torpedo action included some dud hits, heard as a dull clang. In a few instances, Mark 14s would strike a Japanese ship and lodge in its hull without exploding. The contact pistol appeared to be malfunctioning, though the conclusion was anything but clear until running depth and magnetic exploder problems were solved. The experience of Lawrence R. Daspit in Tinosa, firing nine torpedoes at a perfect abeam firing position, was exactly the sort of live-fire trial BuOrd had been prevented from doing in peacetime. It was now clear to all at Pearl Harbor the contact pistol was also defective. Ironically, a direct hit on the target at a 90-degree angle, as recommended in training, would usually fail to detonate; the contact pistol functioned reliably only when the torpedo impacted the target at an oblique angle.

Once the magnetic influence exploder was deactivated, problems with the contact exploder became more apparent. Torpedoes would hit their target without detonating. There might be a small "explosion" when the air flask ruptured due to the impact with the target.

Daspit carefully documented his efforts to sink 19,000-ton whale factory ship Tonan Maru No. 3 on 24 July 1943. He fired four torpedoes from 4,000 yd (3,700 m); two hit, stopping the target dead in the water. Daspit immediately fired another two; these hit as well. With no enemy anti-submarine combatants in sight, Daspit then took time to carefully maneuver into a textbook firing position, 875 yd (800 m) square off the target's beam, where he fired nine more Mark 14s and observed all with his periscope (despite the Japanese firing at it). All were duds. Daspit, suspicious by now he was working with a faulty production run of Mark 14s, saved his last remaining torpedo to be analyzed by experts back at base. Nothing out of the ordinary was found.

==== Lockwood's drop tests ====
Daspit's cruise raised enough of an issue that tests were carried out by COMSUBPAC's gunnery and torpedo officer, Art Taylor. Taylor, "Swede" Momsen, and others fired warshots into the cliffs of Kahoolawe, beginning 31 August 1943. Additional trials, supervised by Taylor, used a crane to drop warheads filled with sand instead of high explosive from a height of 90 feet (27 m) (the height was chosen so the velocity at impact would match the torpedo's running speed of 46 knots (85 km/h)). In these drop tests, 70% of the exploders failed to detonate when they hit the target at 90 degrees. A quick fix was to encourage "glancing" shots (which cut the number of duds in half), until a permanent solution could be found.

==== Contact exploder explanation ====
The Mark 6's contact exploder mechanism descended from the Mark 3 contact exploder. Both exploders had the unusual feature that the firing pin's travel was perpendicular to the torpedo's travel, so the firing pin would be subject to side loading when the torpedo struck its target. The Mark 3 exploder was designed when torpedo speeds were much slower (the Mark 10 torpedo's speed was 30 knots (56 km/h)), but even then the Mark 3 prototypes had problems with the firing pin binding during the high deceleration when the torpedo collided with the target. The solution was to use a stronger firing spring to overcome the binding. The Mark 14 torpedo had a much higher speed of 46 knots (85 km/h), so it would see significantly higher deceleration, but BuOrd apparently just assumed the contact exploder would work at the higher speed. There were no live-fire tests of the Mark 14 torpedo, so there were no-live fire tests of its contact exploder. If BuOrd had tried some live-fire tests of the contact exploder during peacetime, it probably would have experienced some duds and rediscovered the binding problem.

Pearl Harbor made working exploders by using lighter weight aluminum parts. Reducing the mass reduces the binding friction. BuOrd suggested using a stiffer spring, the fix that had worked decades before. In the end, BuOrd adopted a ball switch and electric detonator rather than using a firing pin mechanism.

In September 1943, the first torpedoes with new contact pistols were sent to war. "After twenty-one months of war, the three major defects of the Mark 14 torpedo had at last been isolated. Each defect had been discovered and fixed in the field—always over the stubborn opposition of the Bureau of Ordnance."

=== Circular runs ===
There were numerous reports of the Mark 14 running erratically and circling back on the firing boat. Grunion is thought to have been sunk by a circular-running Mark 14 hitting the periscope tower without exploding, and jamming the diving controls at full emergency dive position. A circular run sank the submarine Tullibee, but it may not have been a Mark 14. Likewise, Sargo was almost sunk by a circular run, but the circular run happened because the gyro had not been installed. The subsequent Mark 18 torpedo was no better, sinking Tang. The surface-launched Mark 15 torpedo had collars to prevent circular runs, but the Mark 14 was never given this feature.

== Resolution ==
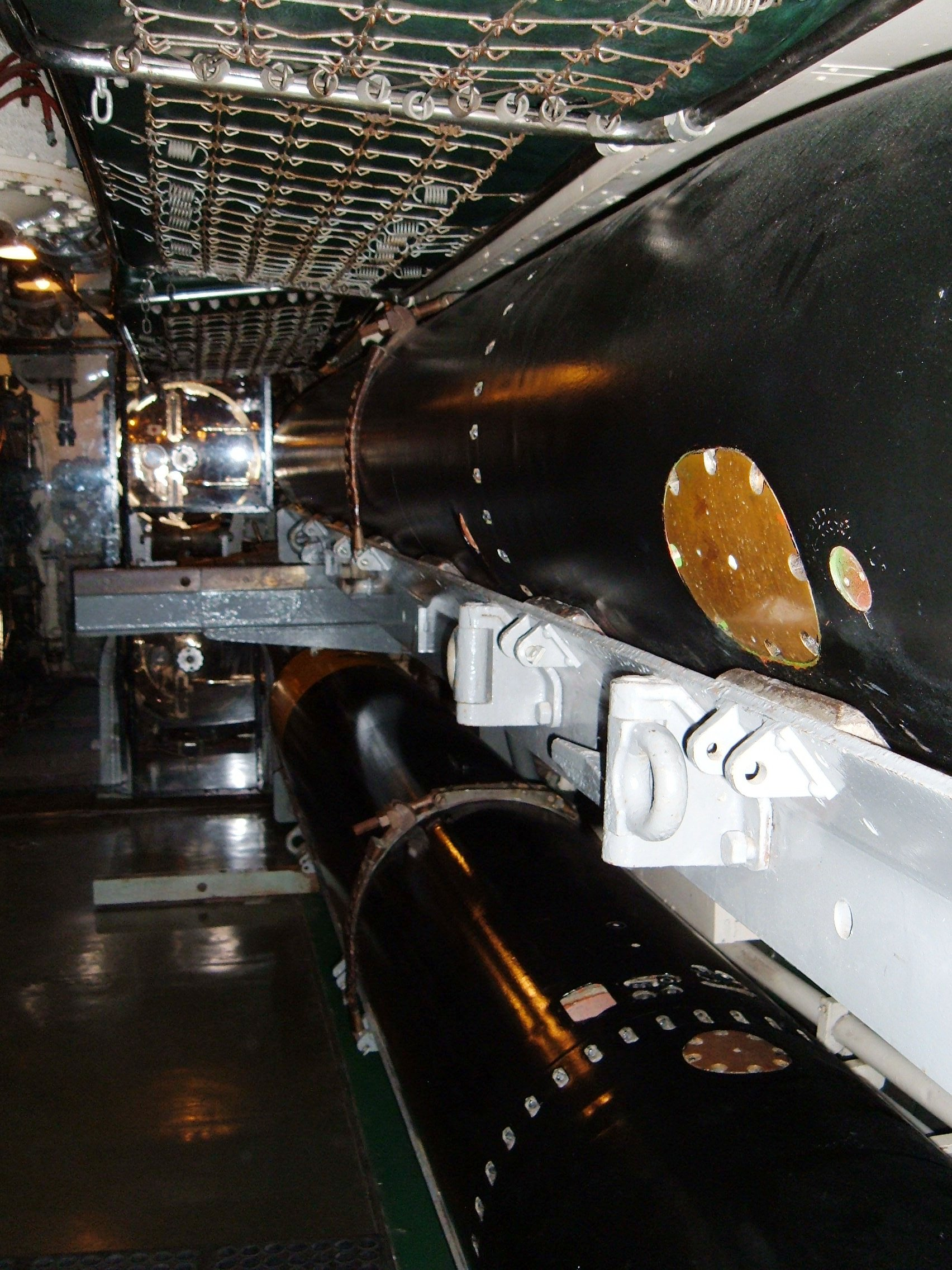
Two Mark 14 torpedoes stored in the aft torpedo room of the museum ship USS Pampanito

Once remedied, sinkings of enemy ships rose noticeably. By the end of World War II the Mark 14 torpedo had become a much more reliable weapon. Lessons learned allowed surface ships such as destroyers to remedy the failings of the Mark 15; the two designs shared the same strengths and faults.

After the war, the best features of the improved Mark 14 were merged with the best features of captured German torpedoes to create the hydrogen peroxide–fueled Mark 16 with a pattern-running option. The Mark 16 became the standard United States post-war anti-shipping torpedo, despite the large remaining inventory of Mark 14 torpedoes.

== Nomenclature ==
Official U.S. Navy naming policy had settled on using Arabic instead of Roman numerals to designate torpedo models since the 1917 development of the Bliss-Leavitt Mark 4 torpedo. However, many instances exist of the Mark 14 being referred to as the "Mark XIV" in official documentation and reports as well as accounts by historians and observers.

== Characteristics ==
- Function: Submarine launched anti-ship torpedo
- Powerplant: Wet-heater combustion / steam turbine with compressed air tank
- Fuel: 180 proof Ethanol blended with methanol or other denaturants
- Length: 20 ft 6 in (6.25 m)
- Weight: 3,280 lb (1,490 kg)
- Diameter: 21 in (530 mm)
- Range / Speed:
  - Low speed: 9,000 yards (8,200 m) at 31 knots (57 km/h)
  - High speed: 4,500 yards (4,100 m) at 46 knots (85 km/h)
- Guidance system: Gyroscope
- Warhead: 643 lb (292 kg) of Torpex
- Date deployed: 1931
- Date withdrawn from service: 1975–1980

== See also ==
Related development

- Mark 15 Torpedo
- Mark 16 Torpedo
- Mark 18 Torpedo

Weapons of comparable role, configuration, and era

- Type 95 Torpedo
- G7e Torpedo

Related lists

- American 21 inch torpedoes
- British 21 inch torpedoes
