= Magnetic pistol =

Fuse trigger device in torpedoes and naval mines

Magnetic pistol is the term for the device on a torpedo or naval mine that detects its target by its magnetic field, and triggers the fuse for detonation. A device to detonate a torpedo or mine on contact with a ship or submarine is known as a contact pistol.

A magnetic pistol on a mine will allow the mine to detonate in proximity to a target, rather than actual contact, allowing the mine to cover a larger effective area.

A magnetic pistol on a torpedo allows the torpedo to detonate underneath the ship, instead of upon impact with the side of the ship. As an explosion underneath a ship is contained between water and the ship, far more damage will result to the ship. The explosion will lift the ship out of the water and may break the keel of the ship, splitting it in two. Any hole created by the explosion will be on the bottom, causing more flooding.

A contact pistol on a torpedo will require the torpedo to strike the side of the ship. Any hole created by the explosion will be closer towards the waterline, reducing flooding. The explosion will also dissipate into the air, reducing the damage. If the torpedo is fired too deep, the torpedo will not hit the ship. If the ship has a round or sloping bottom, the torpedo may glance off the bottom and not detonate.

== History ==
In World War I, German U-boats were using magnetic pistols by 1917, but it would not be until 1918 that Britain would find examples of these while salvaging U-boat SM UB-110. They proved problematic, often firing prematurely.

During World War II, magnetic pistols often exploded prematurely or not at all. The reason was that magnetic lines are more horizontal close to the equator than towards the poles. For example, the US Mark 6 magnetic pistol was designed and tested only once at 41° latitude (60° geomagnetic latitude) at Narragansett Bay, but was primarily used in equatorial latitudes. At the equator, the signal strength to the Mark 6 magnetic pistol was only about half that of where the Mark 6 was tested. Moreover, relative velocity (i.e. when a torpedo is fired from behind or in front of a ship) would additionally change the abruptness of the magnetic signal, resulting in the magnetic pistol being triggered prematurely or not at all.

Eventually, the US Mark 6 magnetic pistol was replaced by contact pistols (which, in the cases of the US Mark 14 submarine torpedo and Mark 15 ship torpedo, proved to be unreliable as well).

Some ships carry degaussing equipment to reduce the signal detected by a magnetic pistol.

During World War II, Japan employed a mechanical remote detonator in order to replicate the functionality of magnetic proximity fuzes used by torpedoes of other navies, such as Germany and the United States. Using a mechanical device circumvented the problems inherent with magnetometric influence sensing. This device, called the Type 1 Detonator T-Device (一式起爆装置T装置, Isshiki Kibaku Sōchi T-Sōchi), featured a tethered underwater kite (凧) which deployed from the head of the torpedo after launch, unreeling the tether under gradual tension. The device resembled a small winged torpedo. The kite would physically collide with the hull of a target surface vessel, whereupon it would sever the tether. A retraction mechanism in the torpedo would sense the sudden slack in the tether, detonating the torpedo warhead, which would by that point be positioned below the target vessel's keel.

== See also ==
- Fuze
- Magnetometer
- Influence mines
