= Operation Petticoat =

1959 film by Blake Edwards

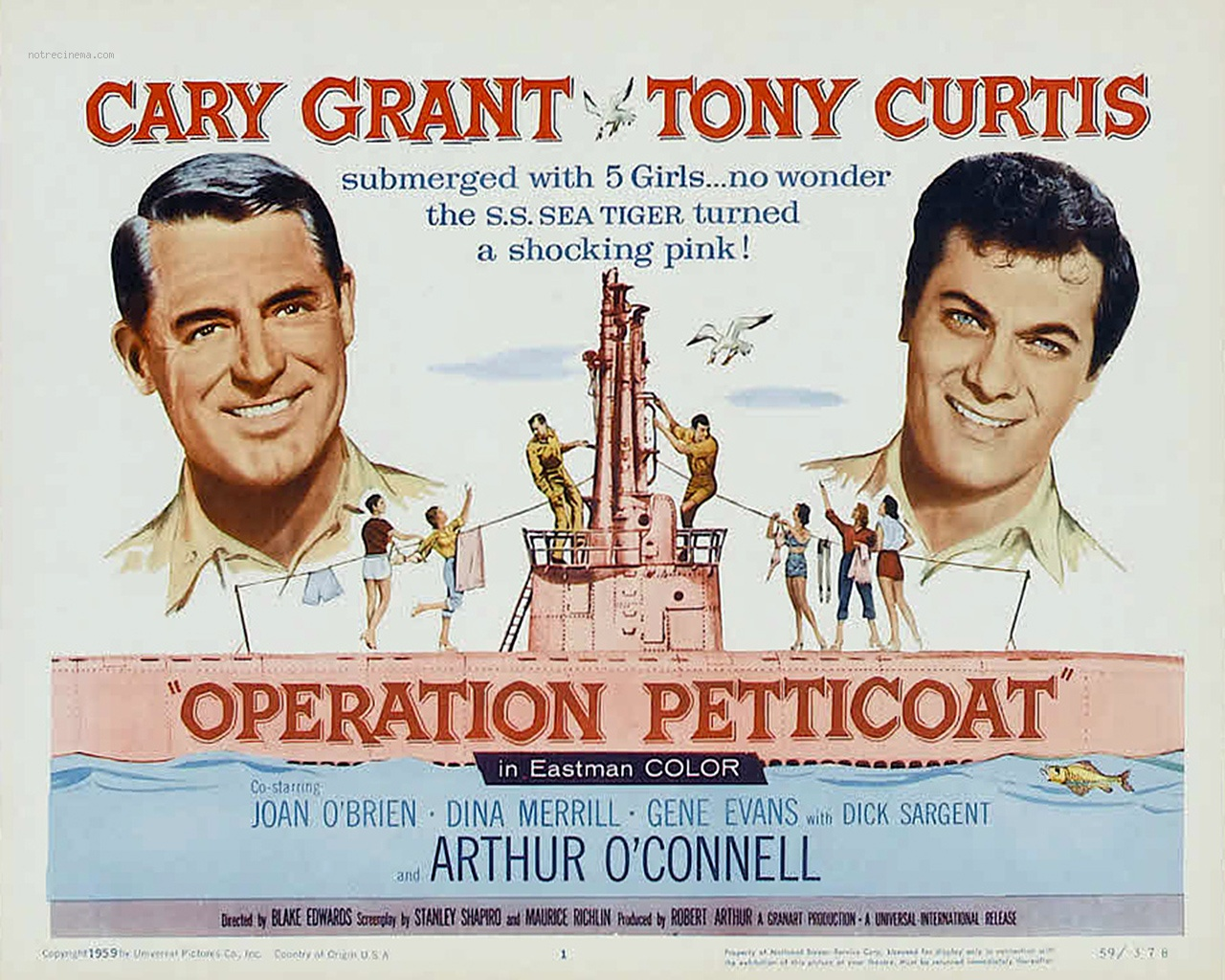
- Theatrical release half-sheet display poster
- Directed by: Blake Edwards
- Screenplay by: Stanley Shapiro; Maurice Richlin
- Based on: a story suggested by Paul King; Joseph B. Stone
- Produced by: Robert Arthur
- Starring: Cary Grant; Tony Curtis; Joan O'Brien; Dina Merrill; Marion Ross; Gene Evans; Dick Sargent; Arthur O'Connell
- Narrated by: Cary Grant
- Cinematography: Russell Harlan
- Edited by: Frank Gross; Ted J. Kent
- Music by: David Rose; Henry Mancini (uncredited)
- Production company: Granart Company
- Distributed by: Universal International
- Release date: December 5, 1959
- Running time: 124 minutes
- Country: United States
- Language: English
- Box office: $9,321,555 (US and Canada rentals) (Note: Please note this figure is rentals accruing to film distributors, not total money earned at the box office.)

Operation Petticoat is a 1959 American World War II submarine comedy film in Eastmancolor from Universal-International, produced by Robert Arthur, directed by Blake Edwards, and starring Cary Grant and Tony Curtis.

The film tells in flashback the misadventures of a fictional U.S. Navy submarine, USS Sea Tiger, during the Battle of the Philippines in the opening days of the United States involvement in World War II. Some elements of the screenplay were taken from actual incidents that happened with some of the Pacific Fleet's submarines during the war. Members of the cast include several actors who went on to become television stars in the 1960s and 1970s: Gavin MacLeod of The Love Boat and McHale's Navy, Marion Ross of Happy Days, and Dick Sargent of Bewitched.

Paul King, Joseph Stone, Stanley Shapiro, and Maurice Richlin were nominated for the Academy Award for Best Writing for their work on Operation Petticoat. The film was the basis for a TV series in 1977 starring John Astin in Grant's role as Lieutenant Commander Matt Sherman.

== Plot ==
In 1959, U. S. Navy Rear Admiral Matt Sherman, ComSubPac, boards the obsolete diesel submarine USS Sea Tiger, prior to her departure for the scrapyard. Sherman, her first commanding officer, begins reading his wartime personal logbook, and a flashback begins.

On December 10, 1941, a Japanese air raid sinks Sea Tiger while she is docked at the Cavite Navy Yard in the Philippines. Lieutenant Commander Sherman and his crew begin repairs, hoping to sail for Darwin, Australia, before the Japanese overrun the port. Believing no chance exists of repairing the submarine, the squadron commodore transfers most of Sherman's crew to other boats, but promises Sherman that he will have first call on any available replacements. Lieutenant (junior grade) Nick Holden, an admiral's aide, is reassigned to Sea Tiger despite a total lack of submarine training or experience.

Holden demonstrates great skill as a scrounger and fixer after Sherman makes him the supply officer. He teams up with Marine Sergeant Ramon Gallardo, an escaped prisoner (caught misappropriating Navy property to run his own restaurant), to obtain materials desperately needed for repairs. What Holden and his men cannot acquire from base warehouses, they steal.

Restored to barely seaworthy condition, Sea Tiger puts to sea after a native witch doctor casts a protection spell on her. Sea Tiger reaches Marinduque, where Sherman reluctantly agrees to evacuate five stranded Army nurses. Holden is attracted to Second Lieutenant Barbara Duran, while Sherman has a few embarrassing encounters with the well-endowed and clumsy Second Lieutenant Dolores Crandall. Later, when Sherman prepares to attack an enemy oiler moored to a pier, Crandall accidentally fires a torpedo prematurely. It misses the tanker and instead "sinks" a truck ashore.

USS Balao standing in for Operation Petticoat's fictional USS Sea Tiger

Sherman tries to put the nurses ashore at Cebu, but an Army officer tells him the Japanese are closing in. Unable to obtain needed supplies from official sources, Sherman allows Holden to set up a casino to acquire them from the troops. Chief Torpedoman Molumphry, the chief of the boat, has been asking for paint. Holden manages to get some red and white lead primer paint, but does not have enough of either for the entire hull. Sherman reluctantly has the two mixed together, resulting in a pale pink primer that is applied. A Japanese air raid forces a hasty departure before the crew can apply a top coat of navy gray.

Tokyo Rose mocks the mysterious pink submarine, while the U.S. Navy believes it to be a Japanese deception and orders that it be sunk on sight. An American destroyer spots Sea Tiger and opens fire, then launches depth charges when the submarine crash dives. Sherman tries an oil slick and then launches blankets, pillows, and life jackets from his one working torpedo tube, but the deception fails. At Holden's suggestion, Sherman ejects the nurses' lingerie. Crandall's bra convinces the destroyer's captain that "the Japanese have nothing like this", and he ceases fire. Sea Tiger, still painted pink, arrives at Darwin, battered and listing, but under her own power.

Sherman's reminiscence ends with the arrival of Commander Nick Holden, his wife (the former Lieutenant Duran), and their two sons. Sherman promises Holden command of a new nuclear-powered submarine, also named Sea Tiger. Sherman's wife (the former Lieutenant Crandall) arrives late with their four daughters and rear-ends her husband's staff car, causing it to lock bumpers with a Navy bus. When the bus drives away, dragging his car with it, Sherman reassures his wife that it will be stopped at the main gate. Commander Holden then takes Sea Tiger out on her final voyage.

== Cast ==
- Cary Grant as Lieutenant Commander (later Rear Admiral) Matthew T. "Matt" Sherman, USN
- Tony Curtis as Lieutenant, Junior Grade (later Commander) Nicholas "Nick" Holden, USNR (later USN)
- Virginia Gregg as Major Edna Heywood, NC, US Army
- Joan O'Brien as Second Lieutenant Dolores Crandall, NC, USAR
- Dina Merrill as Second Lieutenant Barbara Duran, NC, USAR
- Madlyn Rhue as Second Lieutenant Reid, NC, USAR
- Marion Ross as Second Lieutenant Colfax, NC, USAR
- Robert F. Simon as Captain J.B. Henderson, USN
- Robert Gist as Lieutenant Watson, USN, Sherman's Executive Officer (XO)
- Dick Sargent as Ensign Stovall, USN (billed as Richard Sargent)
- Arthur O'Connell as Chief Motor Machinist's Mate Sam Tostin, USN
- Gene Evans as Chief Torpedoman "Mo" Molumphry, USN, Chief of the Boat of the Sea Tiger
- Frankie Darro as Pharmacist's Mate 3rd Class Dooley, USN
- Gavin MacLeod as Yeoman Ernest Hunkle, USN
- Steve Borden as Seaman Kraus, USN
- Ray Austin as Seaman Austin, USN
- George Dunn as The Prophet (of Doom)
- Dick Crockett as Petty Officer Harmon, USN
- Clarence Lung as Sergeant Ramon Gallardo, USMC (billed as Clarence E. Lung)
- Tony Pastor Jr. as Fox
- Robert F. Hoy as Reiner
- John W. Morley as Williams

== Production ==
Tony Curtis took credit for the inception of Operation Petticoat. He had joined the U.S. Navy during World War II, intending to enter the submarine service in part because his hero, Cary Grant, had appeared in Destination Tokyo (1943). After he became a star, Curtis suggested making a film in which Grant would stare into a periscope as he did in Destination Tokyo. Curtis very much enjoyed working with Grant.

Former Universal-International contract actor Jeff Chandler was originally set to have played Matt Sherman, but pulled out to film The Jayhawkers (1959) instead. Tina Louise turned down the role of one of the nurses as she felt the film had too many sex jokes.

Operation Petticoat was produced with extensive support of the Department of Defense and the US Navy. Most of the filming was done in and around Naval Station Key West, now the Truman Annex of Naval Air Station Key West, Florida, which substituted for the Philippines and Australia. Filming for the period, suggesting postwar 1959, was done at Naval Station San Diego, California.

USS Sea Tiger was portrayed by three different American World War II Balao-class submarines:

- USS Queenfish, in the opening and closing scenes (the "393" on the conning tower being visible)
- USS Archerfish, for all the scenes where the boat was painted the standard gray and black
- USS Balao, for all the scenes in which Sea Tiger was painted pink

The attacking destroyer and, during the arrival at Darwin, the destroyer visible in the background is the Fletcher-class destroyer USS Wren.

== Historical accuracy ==
A plot error says that Sea Tiger is heading to Darwin to meet up with the sub tender USS Bushnell in December 1941; Bushnell was not commissioned until 1943.

As noted above, the fictional Sea Tiger is portrayed by three different Balao-class submarines. The action of the film begins on December 10, 1941, with Sea Tiger already in service; however, the first Balao-class submarine would not be launched until late October 1942. (Based on her name, Sea Tiger probably would have been a prewar Sargo-class submarine.)

Some of the plot points of Operation Petticoat were based on real-life incidents, such as:

- The evacuation of one Navy nurse and several Army nurses from Corregidor to Australia by the submarine USS Spearfish, commanded by future Navy Cross recipient James C. Dempsey; (Note: USS Spearfish (SS-190) evacuation took place on the night of May 3, 1942.)
- The evacuation of Filipino civilians to Australia may have been inspired by USS Narwhal's evacuation of 32 civilians from Mindanao, including eight women, two children, and an infant during her seventh war patrol on November 15, 1943.
- The sinking of the submarine USS Sealion at the pier at Cavite Navy Yard in the Philippines;
- The torpedoing of a bus by USS Bowfin; (Note: The bus "sinking" took place during an attack at Minami Daito on July 16, 1944, when one of Bowfin's torpedoes hit a dock and blew the bus into the harbor.)
- Captain Sherman's letter to the supply department at Cavite on the inexplicable lack of toilet paper (based on an actual letter to the supply department of Mare Island Naval Shipyard by Lieutenant Commander James Wiggins "Red" Coe of the submarine USS Skipjack);
- The need to paint a submarine pink because of a lack of enough red or white lead undercoat: Heat from the burning USS Sealion also scorched off the black paint on the nearby USS Seadragon; for a time, the submarine fought with only her red lead undercoat visible. This led Tokyo Rose to disparage American "red pirate submarines".
- Another possible source for the "pink" submarine is the decorated USS Harder, commanded by Samuel David Dealey. Under the belief that a pinkish tint would help with camouflage, especially near dawn and dusk, Dealey added pink to the light grey that was standard for the Navy's Measure 32 paint scheme.

== Reception ==
Operation Petticoat was a hit with audiences and critics. On review aggregator Rotten Tomatoes, the film has an approval rating of 81% based on 21 reviews, with an average score of 6.60/10.

The review in Variety was typical: "Operation Petticoat has no more weight than a sackful of feathers, but it has a lot of laughs. Cary Grant and Tony Curtis are excellent, and the film is directed by Blake Edwards with a slam-bang pace". A much more restrained commentary came from Bosley Crowther of The New York Times, who noted in his December 8, 1959 review that the plot device of women aboard a wartime submarine was strained. "And that is the obvious complication upon which are pointedly based at least 60 per cent of the witticisms and sight gags in the film. How to berth the nurses in the exceedingly limited space, how to explain to them the functioning of the bathroom facilities, how to compel the sailors to keep their well-diverted minds on their work — these are the endless petty problems that vex Commander Grant".

=== Box office performance ===
Operation Petticoat was a huge box office hit, earning over $9.3 million in theatrical rentals in the United States and Canada, which made it the third highest-grossing film of 1959, the highest-domestic-grossing comedy of all-time up to that point, as well as the most financially successful film of Cary Grant's career. Through his contract, Grant's residuals topped $3 million, making Operation Petticoat his most profitable film to date.

== 1977 television series ==
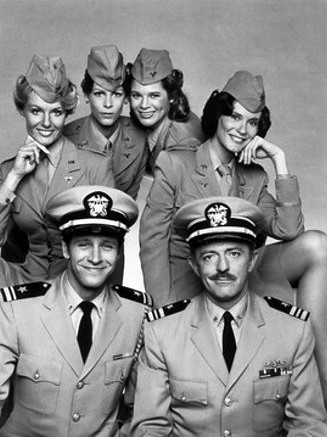
The television cast: back, from left: Dorrie Thomson, Jamie Lee Curtis, Melinda Naud, Bond Gideon. Front, from left: Richard Gilliland, John Astin.

Operation Petticoat was adapted as an ABC-TV series which ran from September 17, 1977, to August 10, 1979. Initially starring John Astin in Grant's role of Lieutenant Commander Sherman, the TV series cast Tony Curtis' daughter, Jamie Lee Curtis, as Lieutenant Barbara Duran. Most of the cast was replaced for the show's second season, a decision that led to low ratings and cancellation. Only 32 episodes of the series (22 in season 1, 10 in season 2) were produced in total.
