= James C. Dempsey =

American submarine commander

James Charles Dempsey
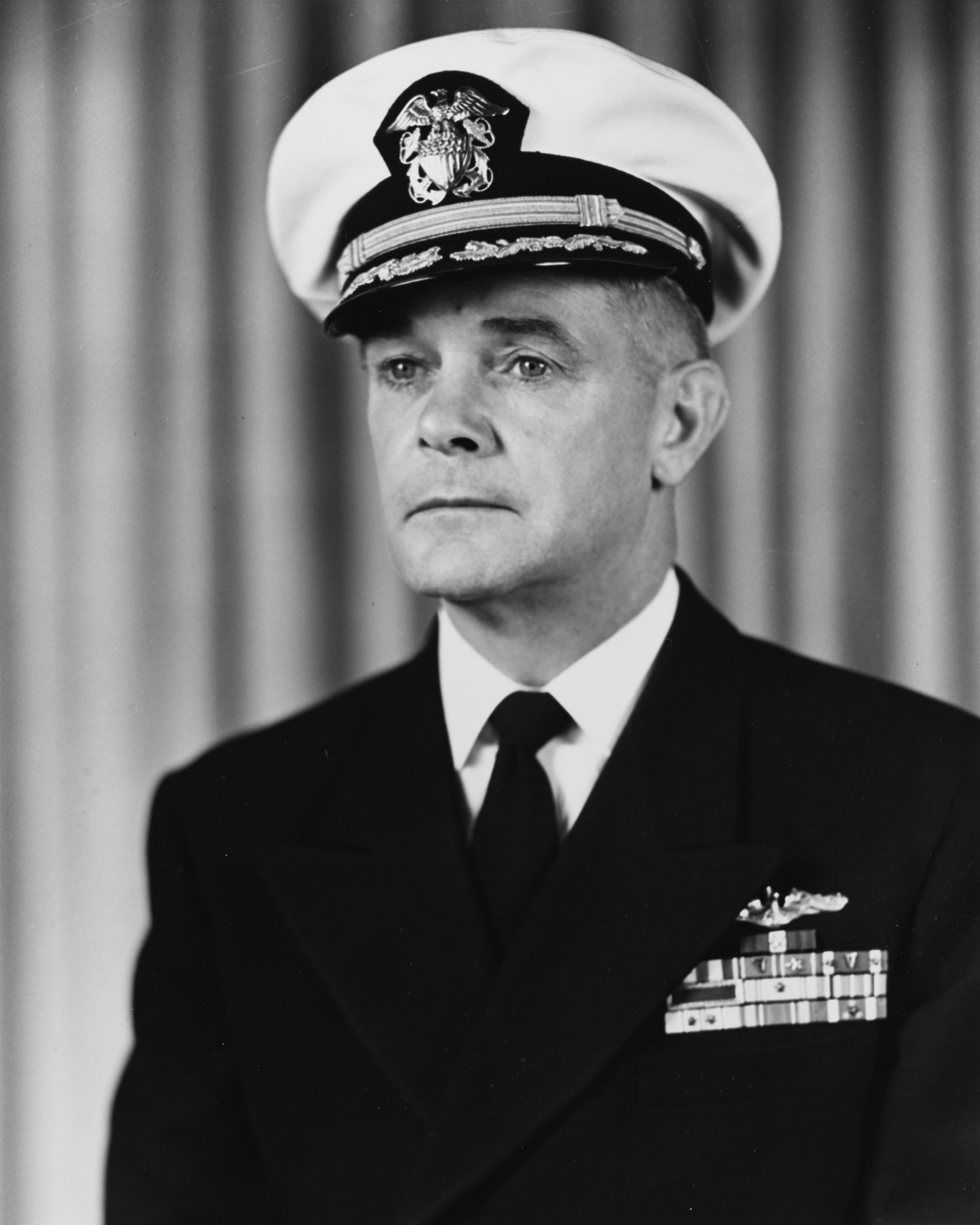
- Born: August 30, 1908; Maritime Republic of Eastport
- Died: July 9, 1979 (aged 70) Portsmouth, Virginia, U.S.
- Buried: Arlington National Cemetery
- Allegiance: United States of America
- Branch: United States Navy
- Service years: 1931–1970
- Rank: Rear Admiral
- Commands: USS S-37 (SS-142); USS Spearfish (SS-190); USS Cod (SS-224); Submarine Division 101; Submarine Division 72; Submarine Squadron 1 USS Waccamaw (AO-109); Submarine Flotilla 1 Military Sea Transportation Service; Amphibious Group 2
- Conflicts: World War II; Battle of Makassar Strait
- Awards: Navy Cross (2); Silver Star; Bronze Star (2)
- Education: United States Naval Academy; Naval War College

James Charles Dempsey (August 30, 1908 – July 9, 1979), was a decorated submarine commander during World War II who reached the rank of Rear Admiral in the United States Navy. He died, aged 70, on July 9, 1979, of congestive heart and kidney failure at the Portsmouth Naval Hospital near his home in Norfolk, Virginia.

== Biography ==
Dempsey was born on August 30, 1908, in Eastport, Maryland into a Navy family. He grew up near naval bases in Key West, Florida, New London, Connecticut and Brooklyn, New York City. His father, James Patrick Dempsey, was an Irish-born chief gunner who was commissioned as a lieutenant during World War I. The younger Dempsey entered the United States Naval Academy in 1927 and graduated on June 4, 1931. After serving aboard the battleship USS Oklahoma, he reported for submarine training at New London in 1933. Dempsey later studied strategy and tactics at the Naval War College in 1951.

As submarine commander of the USS S-37 (SS-142), he sank the first enemy destroyer in World War II on February 8, 1942.

For this action, he was awarded a Navy Cross. According to the official award citation, it was awarded "For extraordinary heroism and distinguished service in the line of his profession as Commanding Officer of the USS S-37, in offensive action in the Straits of Makassar on February 8, 1942 ... Lieutenant Dempsey attacked four vessels ... at close range, completely destroying one of them in the engagement."

As commander of the USS Spearfish a few months later, Dempsey helped to evacuate the last Americans from the island of Corregidor before it fell to the Japanese on May 6, 1942. On May 3, Dempsey led the Spearfish into hostile waters around Corregidor island. According to a historian of submarine operations in World War II, "Spearfish (Lieutenant Commander J.C. Dempsey) was the last submarine to visit crumbling Corregidor. On May 3 she evacuated 12 Army and Navy officers, 11 Army nurses, a Navy nurse and a civilian woman…the last of Corregidor's defenders to be reprieved. Here again was proof of the submersible's ability to operate unsupported in waters under enemy control. With Japanese warships on every hand, Spearfish got in and got out, accomplishing one of the war's most perilous rescue missions...".

For Dempsey's "extraordinary heroism and conspicuous devotion to duty", he won a gold star, in lieu of a second Navy Cross, for this accomplishment.

His evacuation of Americans from Corregidor, which included Army and Navy nurses, was later fictionalized in the 1959 Hollywood film, Operation Petticoat, which starred Cary Grant as the commander of the submarine.

His exploits were also recreated in the late 1950s TV series, The Silent Service, where he was portrayed in three episodes by DeForest Kelley.

On June 12, 1937, Dempsey married Virginia Weakley Brandt at St. Madeline Sophie Catholic Church in Germantown, Philadelphia. He later remarried with Jean Audrey Emanuel of Quebec. James and Audrey Dempsey are interred in Section 3 of Arlington National Cemetery.
