= USS Cod =

Submarine of the United States

USS Cod (SS-224)
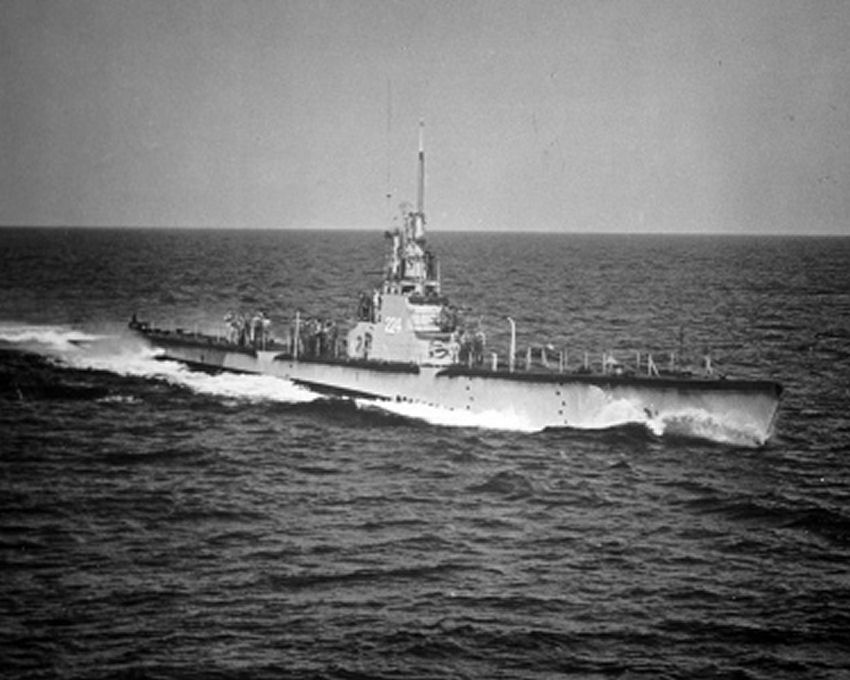
- USS Cod (SS-224) underway off Block Island, Rhode Island in December 1951

History

United States
- Name: USS Cod
- Namesake: Cod
- Ordered: 9 September 1940
- Builder: Electric Boat Company, Groton, Connecticut
- Laid down: 21 July 1942
- Launched: 21 March 1943
- Sponsored by: Mrs. G.M. Mahoney
- Acquired: 21 June 1943
- Commissioned: 21 June 1943
- Decommissioned: 21 June 1954
- In service: 21 March 1943
- Out of service: 15 December 1971
- Reclassified: AGSS-224, 1 December 1962, IXSS-224, 30 June 1971
- Stricken: 15 December 1971
- Honors and awards: Seven battle stars for her successful World War II patrols
- Status: Museum ship and memorial in Cleveland, Ohio since 1 May 1976
- Badge

General characteristics
- Class & type: Gato-class diesel-electric submarine
- Displacement: 1,525 long tons (1,549 t) surfaced; 2,424 long tons (2,463 t) submerged
- Length: 312 ft (95 m)
- Beam: 27 ft 3 in (8.31 m)
- Draft: 17 ft (5.2 m) maximum
- Propulsion: 4 × General Motors Model 16-248 V16 Diesel engines driving electric generators; 2 × 126-cell Sargo batteries; 4 × high-speed General Electric electric motors with reduction gears; two propellers; 5,400 shp (4.0 MW) surfaced; 2,740 shp (2.0 MW) submerged
- Speed: 21 kn (39 km/h; 24 mph) surfaced; 9 kn (17 km/h; 10 mph) submerged
- Range: 11,000 nautical miles (20,000 km; 13,000 mi) surfaced at 10 kn (19 km/h; 12 mph)
- Endurance: 48 hours at 2 kn (3.7 km/h; 2.3 mph) submerged; 75 days on patrol
- Test depth: 300 ft (90 m)
- Complement: 6 officers, 54 enlisted
- Armament: 10 × 21 inch (533 mm) torpedo tubes (6 bow, 4 stern), 1 × 4"/50 caliber gun (102 mm), later 1 x 5"/25 caliber gun (127 mm), 40 mm Bofors and 20 mm Oerlikon cannon
- USS Cod (Submarine)
- U.S. National Register of Historic Places
- U.S. National Historic Landmark
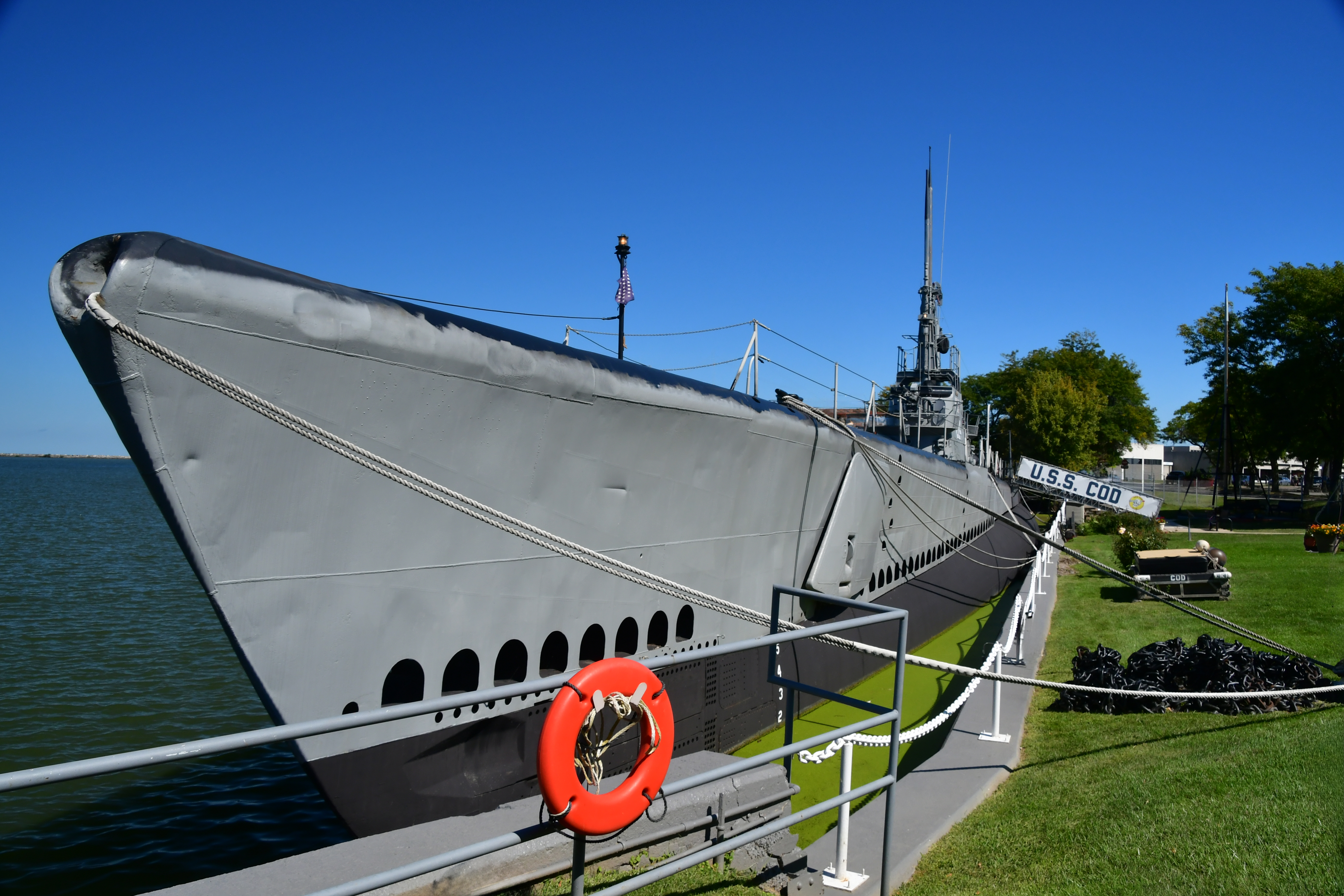
- USS Cod moored in Cleveland, Ohio's North Coast Harbor

- Location within Cleveland Location within Ohio Location within the United States
- Location: Cleveland, Ohio
- Coordinates: 41°30′36″N 81°41′30″W
- Area: Less than one acre
- Built: 1942
- Built by: Electric Boat Company, Groton, Connecticut
- Architectural style: Submarine
- NRHP reference No.: 86000088

Significant dates
- Added to NRHP: 14 January 1986
- Designated NHL: 14 January 1986

USS Cod (SS/AGSS/IXSS-224) is a Gato-class submarine, the only vessel of the United States Navy to be named for the cod, an important and very popular food fish of the North Atlantic and North Pacific oceans. She was launched on 21 March 1943, and commissioned on 21 June 1943.

Cod is now a National Historic Landmark, preserved as a museum ship and memorial permanently moored in Cleveland, Ohio, and is open to visitors daily from May to November.

== Construction and commissioning ==
Cod's keel was laid down by the Electric Boat Company at Groton, Connecticut, on 21 July 1942. The submarine's four main Cleveland Model 16-248 V16 diesel engines and one Cleveland Model 8-268 auxiliary diesel engine were built by General Motors Cleveland Diesel Engine Division on Cleveland's west side. She was launched on 21 March 1943, sponsored by Mrs. G.M. Mahoney, and commissioned on 21 June 1943 with Commander James C. Dempsey, USN in command. Commander Dempsey had already won fame by sinking the first Japanese destroyer lost in World War II while in command of the submarine USS S-37 (SS-142).

== World War II ==
On 30 August 1943, the American Type C1-B cargo ship SS Alcoa Patriot opened gunfire on Cod in the Caribbean Sea at 12°25′N 076°03′W, about 120 nautical miles (220 km; 140 mi) north-northwest of Barranquilla, Colombia, and 330 nautical miles (610 km; 380 mi) east of the northern entrance to the Panama Canal. Less than three hours later, Alcoa Patriot again sighted Cod and fired on her at 12°02′N 076°04′W, about 105 nautical miles (194 km; 121 mi) northwest of Barranquilla and 310 nautical miles (570 km; 360 mi) east of the northern entrance to the Panama Canal. Cod suffered no damage or casualties in either incident.

=== First patrol, October 1943 – January 1944 ===
Cod arrived in Brisbane, Australia, on 2 October 1943 to prepare for her first war patrol. She sailed from there 20 days later. Penetrating the South China Sea, she contacted few targets, and launched an attack only once, on 29 November, with unobserved results. She returned to Fremantle, Australia, to refit from 16 December 1943 to 11 January 1944.

=== Second patrol, February 1944 – March 1944 ===
Cod put to sea for her second war patrol in the South China Sea, off Java, and off Halmahera. On 16 February, she surfaced to sink a sampan by gunfire, and on 23 February, torpedoed a Japanese merchantman. She sent another to the bottom on 27 February, Taisoku Maru (2,473 tons) and two days later attacked a third, only to be forced deep by a concentrated depth charging delivered by a Japanese escort ship.

=== Third patrol, March 1944 – June 1944 ===
Refitting at Fremantle again from 13 March – 6 April 1944, Cod sailed to the Sulu Sea and the South China Sea off Luzon for her third war patrol. On 10 May, she attacked a heavily escorted convoy of 32 ships and sank the destroyer Karukaya and cargo merchantman Shohei Maru (7,256 tons) before the escorts drove her down with depth charges. She returned to Fremantle to replenish on 1 June 1944.

=== Fourth patrol, July 1944 – August 1944 ===
Cod was put to sea again 3 July on her fourth war patrol. She ranged from the coast of Luzon to Java. She sank the converted net tender, Seiko Maru (708 tons) on 3 August, and a landing craft, LSV-129, on 14 August, and, once more successful, she returned to Fremantle 25 August.

=== Fifth patrol, September 1944 – November 1944 ===
Cod put to sea on her fifth war patrol 18 September 1944, bound for Philippine waters. She made her first contact, a cargo ship, Tatsushiro Maru (6,886 tons) on 5 October, and sank it. Two days later, she inflicted heavy damage on a tanker. Contacting a large convoy on 25 October, Cod launched several attacks without success. With all her torpedoes expended, she continued to shadow the convoy for another day to report its position. In November she took up a lifeguard station off Luzon, ready to rescue carrier pilots carrying out the series of air strikes on Japanese bases which paved the way for the Battle of Leyte later that month.

Cod returned to Pearl Harbor Naval Base on 20 November 1944, and sailed on to a stateside overhaul at Mare Island Naval Shipyard, returning to Pearl Harbor on 7 March 1945.

=== Sixth patrol, March 1945 – May 1945 ===
On 24 March she sailed from Pearl Harbor for the East China Sea on her sixth war patrol. Assigned primarily to lifeguard duty, she used her deck gun to sink a tugboat and its tow on 17 April, rescuing three survivors, and on 24 April launched an attack on a convoy which resulted in the most severe depth charging of her career. The next day, she sent the minesweeper W-41 to the bottom. On 26 April Cod was threatened by a fire in the aft torpedo room, but the ship's crew brought the fire under control and manually launched a torpedo already in its tube before the fire could detonate it. QM2c Lawrence E. Foley and S1c Andrew G. Johnson were washed overboard while freeing the torpedo room hatch. Foley was recovered the next morning, but Johnson drowned during the night. This was Cod's only fatality during World War II.

=== Seventh patrol, May 1945 – June 1946 ===
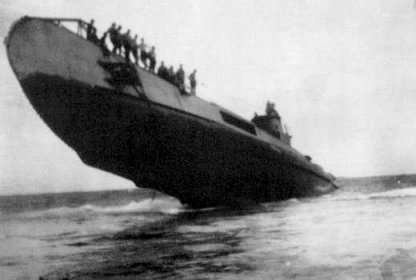
O-19 stuck on Ladd Reef

After refitting at Guam between 29 May and 26 June 1945, Cod put out for the Gulf of Siam and the coast of Indo-China on her seventh war patrol. On 9 and 10 July she went to the rescue of a grounded Dutch submarine, O-19, taking its crew on board and destroying the Dutch submarine when it could not be gotten off the reef. This was the only international submarine-to-submarine rescue in history. After returning the Dutch sailors to U.S. Naval Base Subic Bay, between 21 July and 1 August Cod made 20 gunfire attacks on the junks, motor sampans, and barges which were all that remained to supply the Japanese at Singapore. After inspecting each contact to rescue civilian crew, Cod sank it by gunfire and torpedoes, sending to the bottom a total of 23. On 1 August, an enemy plane strafed Cod, forcing her to dive, leaving one of her boarding parties behind. The men were rescued two days later by USS Blenny (SS-324).

When Cod returned to Fremantle 13 August 1945, the crew of O-19 was waiting to throw a party for their rescuers. During that celebration, the two crews learned of the Japanese surrender. To symbolize that moment, another symbol was added to Cod's battle flag: the name O-19 under a martini glass.

Cod sailed for home on 31 August. Arriving at Naval Submarine Base New London, on 3 November after a visit to Miami, Florida, Cod sailed to the Philadelphia Navy Yard for a overhaul, returning to New London, Connecticut where she was decommissioned and placed in reserve 22 June 1946.

=== Post-War service, June 1946 – June 1954 ===
Cod was mothballed in 1946, Cod was recommissioned in 1951 to participate in NATO anti-submarine training exercises. During the Cold War, Cod traveled to St. John's, Newfoundland, as well as Cuba and South America.

== Great Lakes training vessel, June 1954 – December 1971 ==
Cod was decommissioned in 1954 and placed in reserve. In 1959 she was towed through the St. Lawrence Seaway to Cleveland, Ohio and was used as a training vessel. The Cod served as a training platform during the reservists' weekend drills. The Cod was reclassified first as an Auxiliary Submarine (AGSS-224) on 1 December 1962, and later as a Unclassified Miscellaneous Submarine (IXSS-224) on 30 June 1971. The Cod was in commission, but classed as "in commission in reserve". On 15 December 1971, the Cod was stricken from the Naval Vessel Register.

== Awards and decorations ==
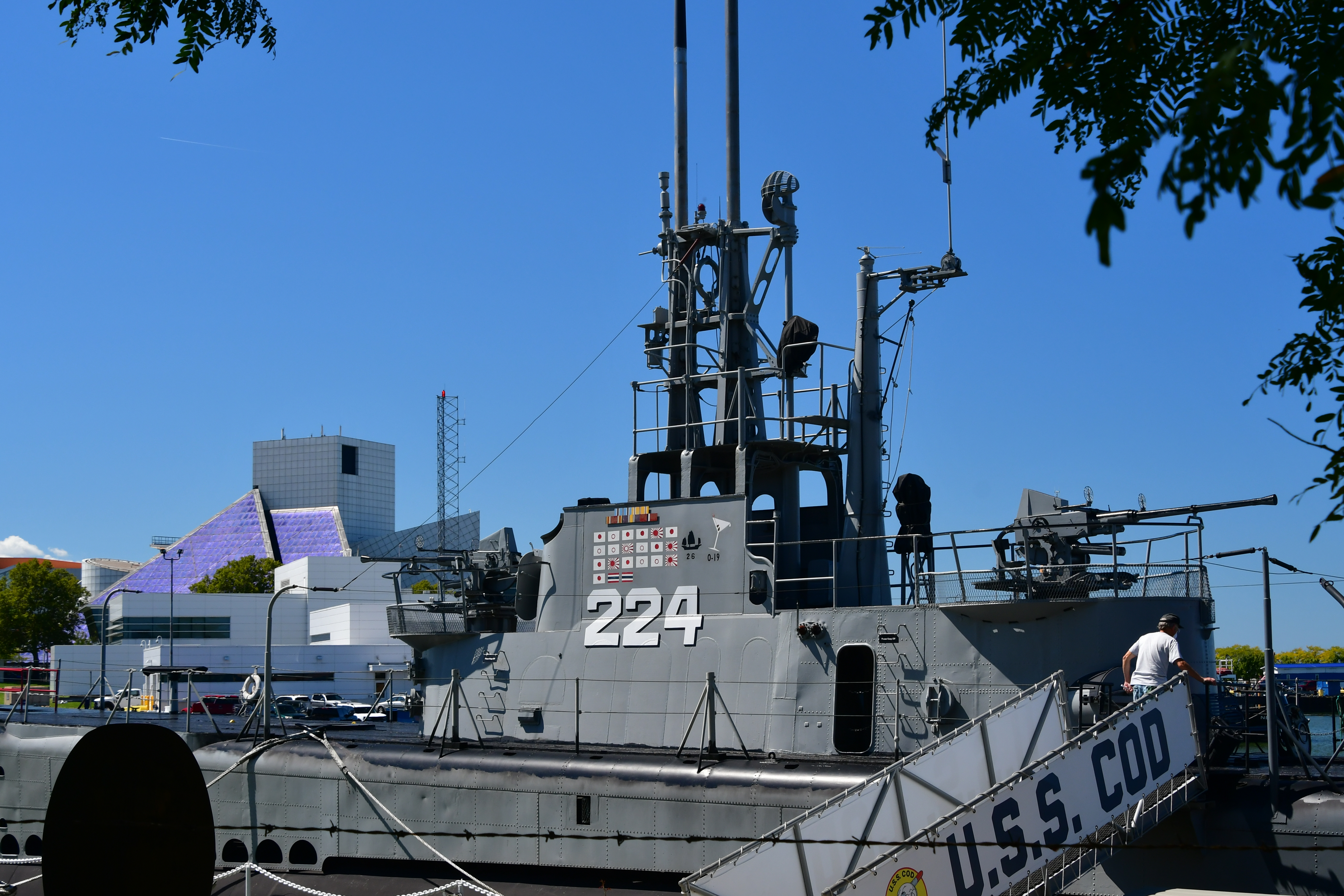
Cod's conning tower with her battle stars, battleflag, and cocktail glass

Cod is credited with sinking more than 12 enemy vessels totaling more than 37,000 tons, and damaging another 36,000 tons of enemy shipping. All seven of her war patrols were considered successful and Cod was awarded seven battle stars for her service in World War II, Cod's battleflag and conning tower both carry a cocktail glass above the name O-19 to commemorate the rescue and the party.

American Campaign Medal
Asiatic-Pacific Campaign Medal with seven battle stars	World War II Victory Medal	National Defense Service Medal	Philippine Liberation Medal

== Museum ship ==
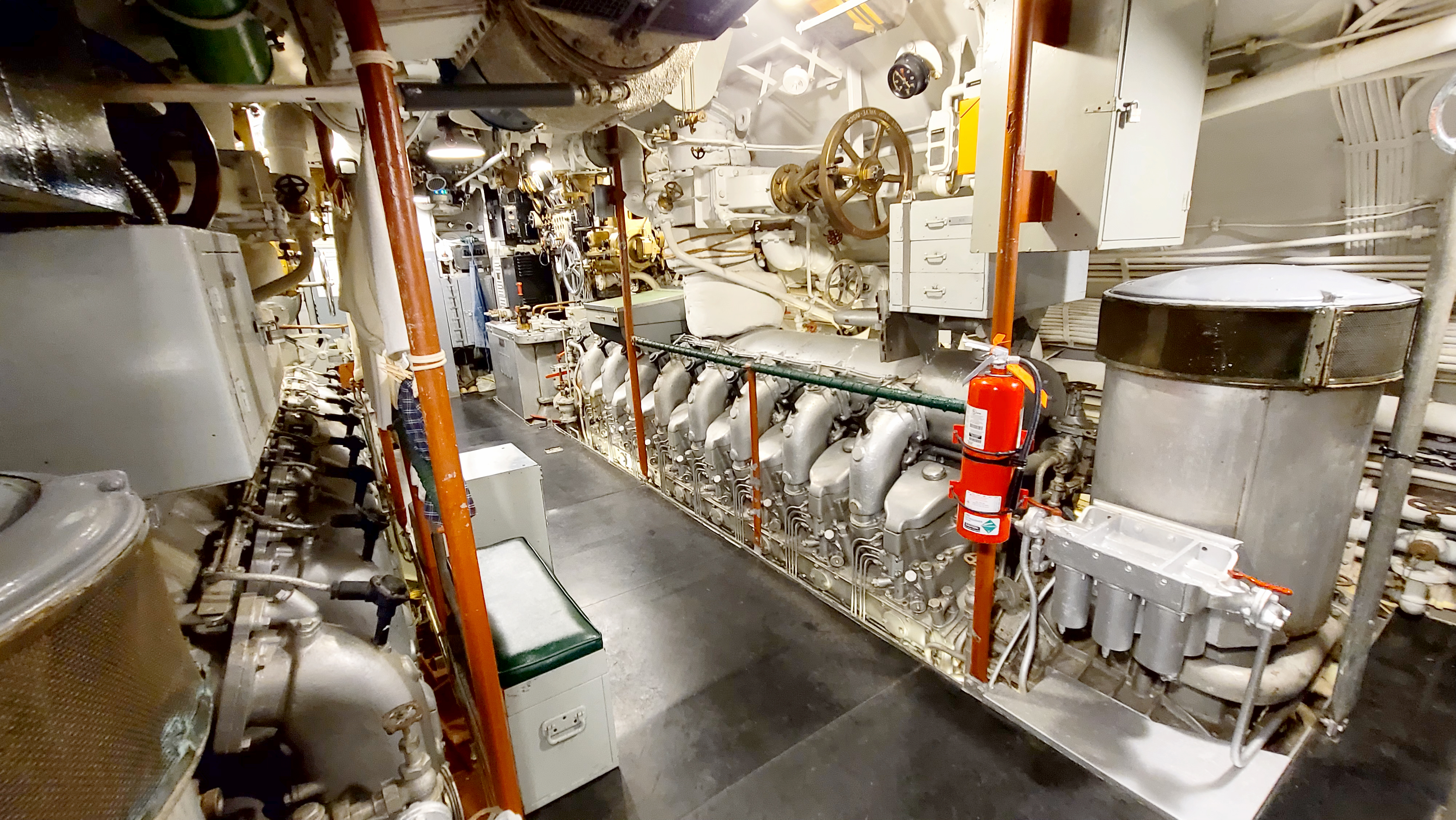
Cod's engine room shown with her General Motors Cleveland Model 16-248 V16 diesel engines

A group of Cleveland residents formed the Cleveland Coordinating Committee to Save Cod, Inc., with the goal of preserving the ship as a memorial. On 25 January 1976, the United States Navy gave guardianship of the submarine to the group. Cod opened for public tours as a floating memorial on 1 May 1976. In 1986, the U.S. Department of the Interior designated Cod a National Historic Landmark. The memorial is open daily between May and November of each year.

Today, Cod is the only World War II United States Navy museum submarine that has not had stairways and doors cut into her pressure hull for public access and is the only World War II Fleet submarine that is still intact and in her wartime configuration. Visitors to the ship use the same vertical ladders and hatches that were used by her crew. The ship's 5-inch deck gun, Mark IV Torpedo Data Computer, SJ-5 radar, Sound-powered telephone, and all five diesel engines have been restored and are fully operable.

Cleveland can claim partial credit as Cod's birthplace, since the submarine's four main diesel engines, and one auxiliary diesel engine were built at the General Motors Cleveland Diesel Engine Division on Cleveland's west side. Cod acquired two General Motors Cleveland Model 16-248 V16 diesel engines that had originally been used aboard another World War II submarine, USS Stingray (SS-186). The engines are held in reserve for parts for the restoration of Cod's engines.

The Cod operates an amateur radio station, W8COD, and participates in various amateur radio contests and other events such as Field Day.

On 13 June 2021, Cod departed Cleveland under tow to Donjon Shipbuilding & Repair in Erie, Pennsylvania for dry docking to repair and renew her underwater hull. The last time the Cod was in dry dock for repairs was in 1963 in Lorain, Ohio. Cod was closed to tours for approximately 64 days for a dry dock maintenance program. The goal of the $1.1 million project, partially funded by a $395,050 grant from the Save America's Treasures grant program administered by the U.S. Department of the Interior, is to conserve and restore the underwater hull of the submarine. Cod returned to Cleveland on 18 August 2021 to the 1201 North Marginal Road berth that she has occupied since her arrival in Cleveland in 1959.

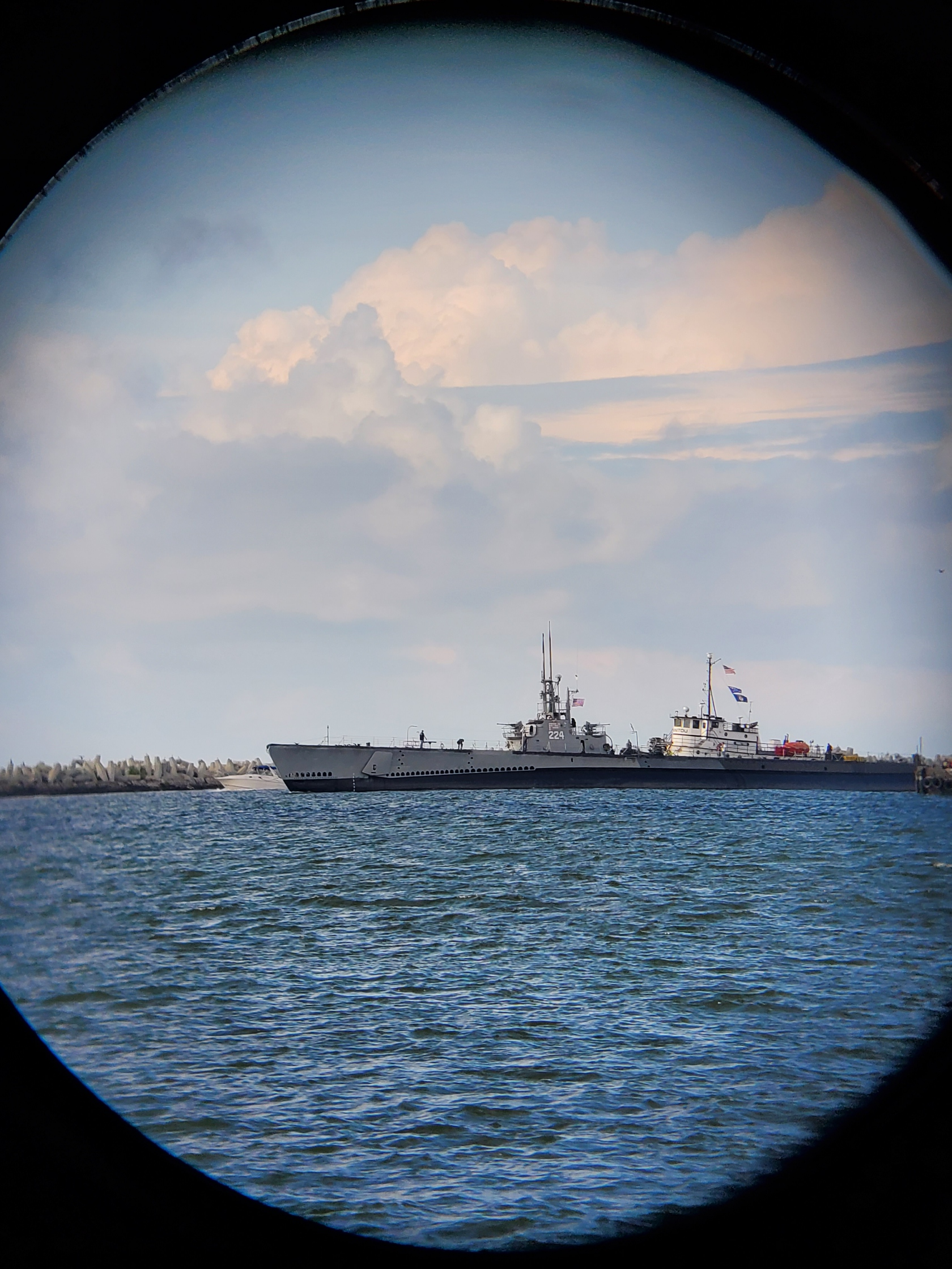
Cod returns to Cleveland on 18 August 2021 after her dry docking project completion in Erie aided by the tug Manitou

On 21 June 2023, Cod celebrated its 80th anniversary of her commissioning during World War II.

== Gallery ==
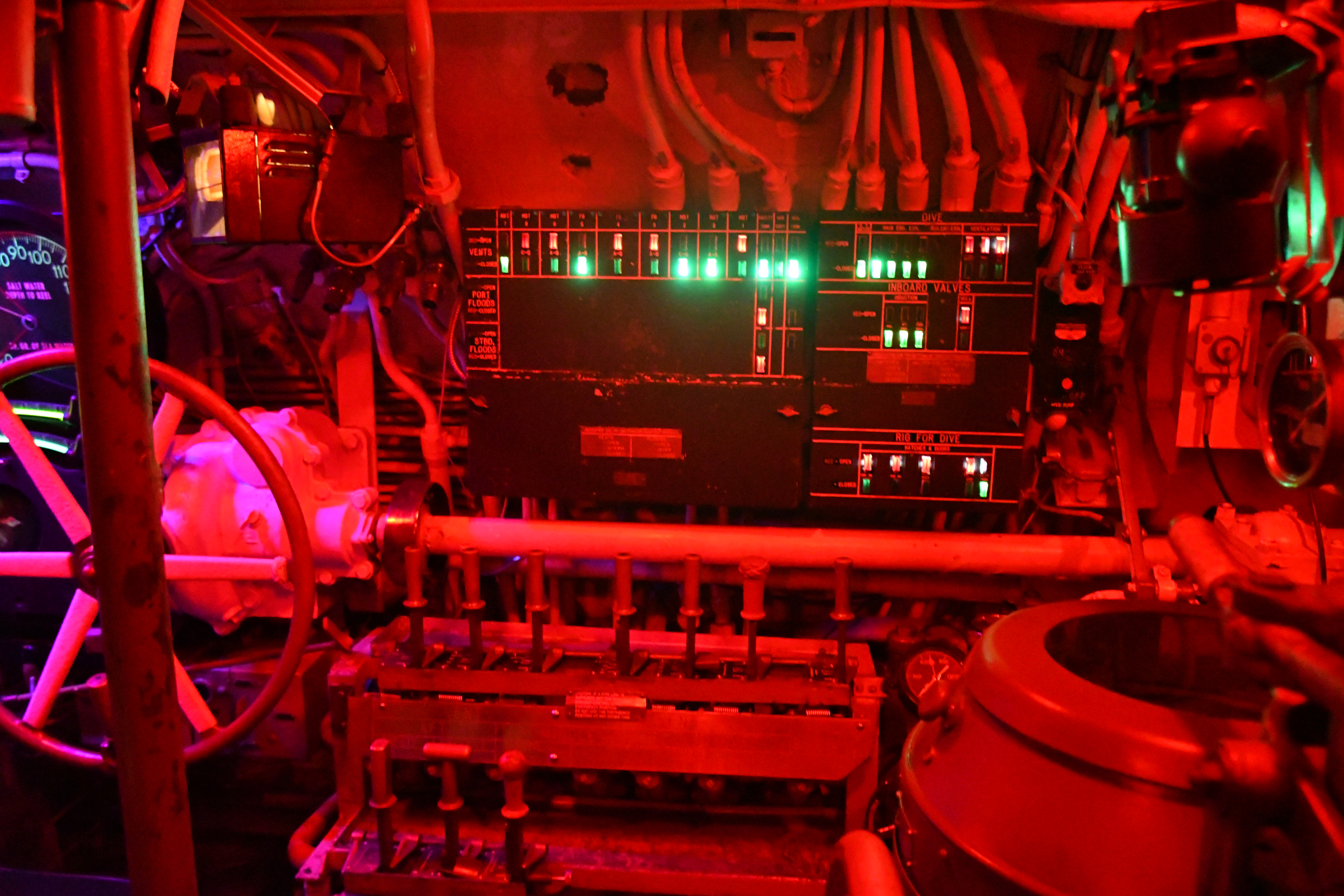
Control Room

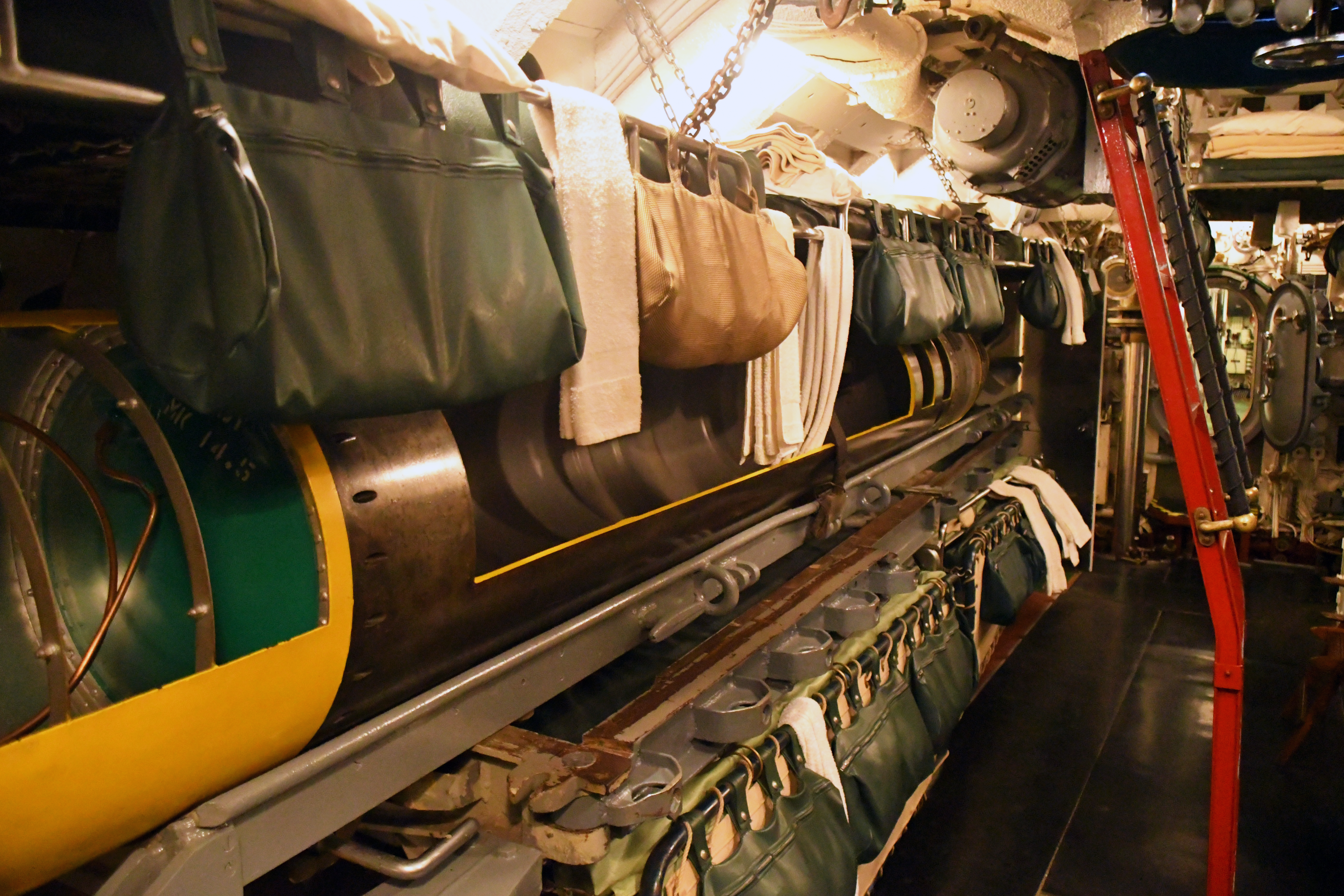
Forward Torpedo Room

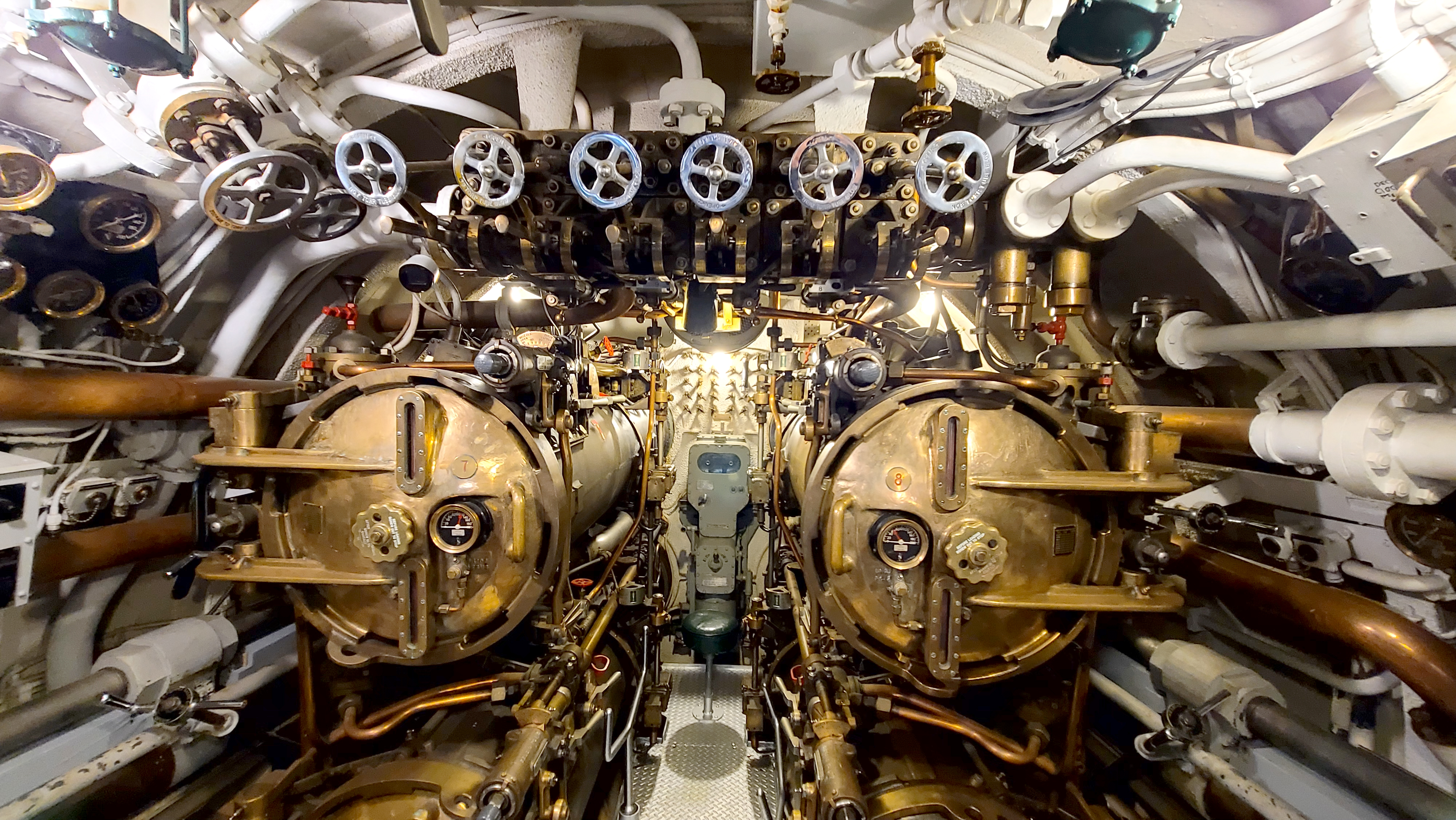
Aft Torpedo Room

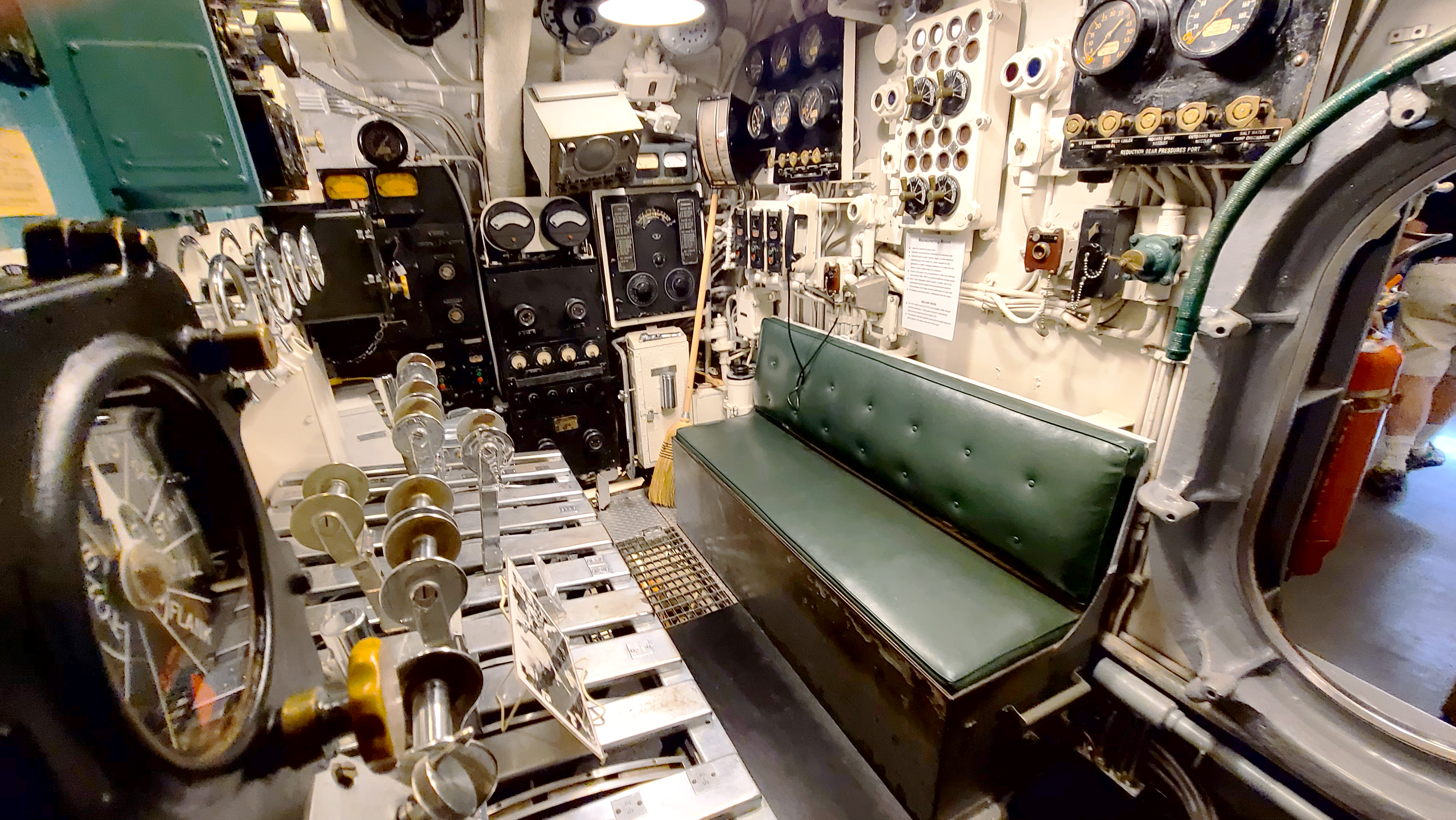
Maneuvering Room

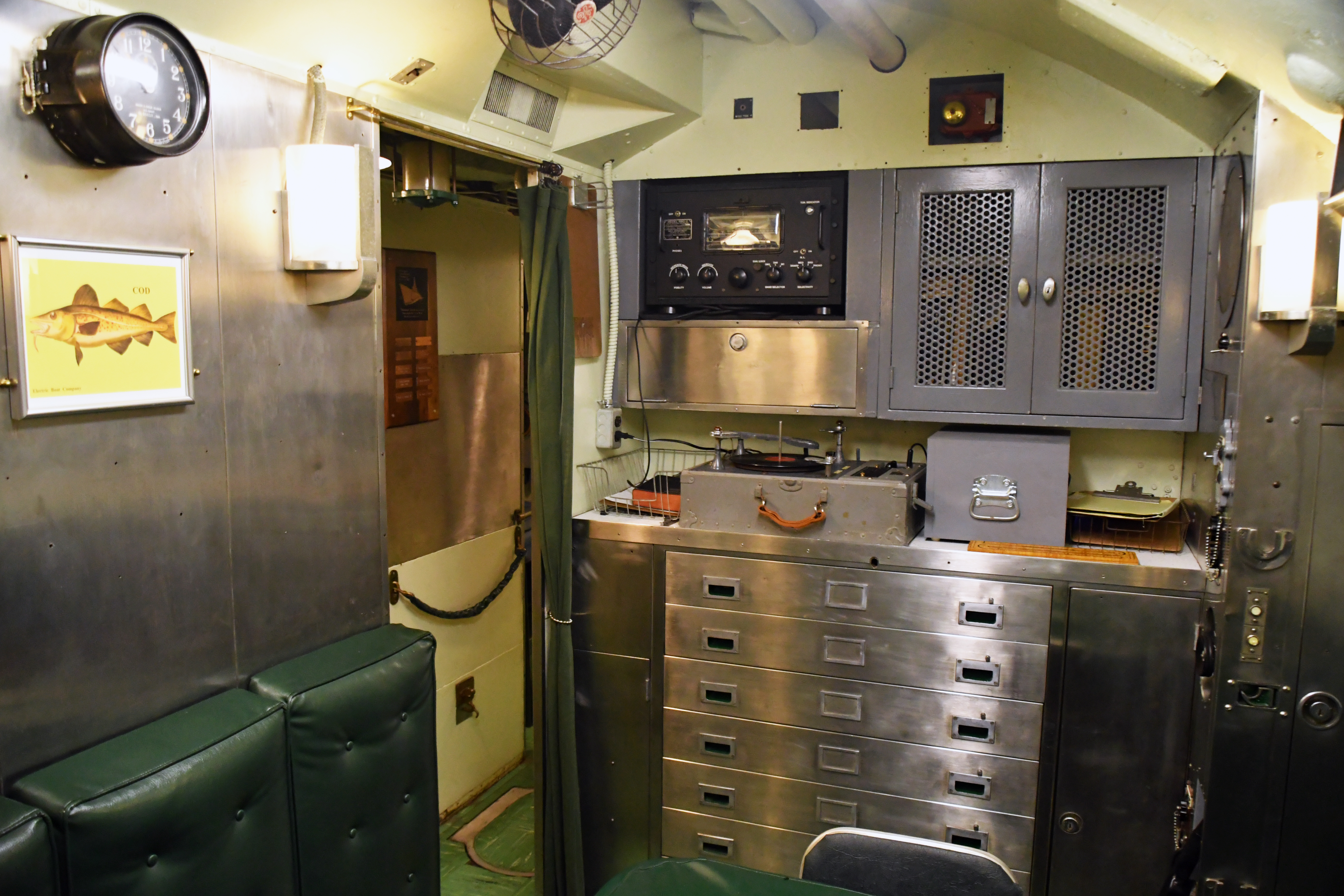
Officer's Ward Room

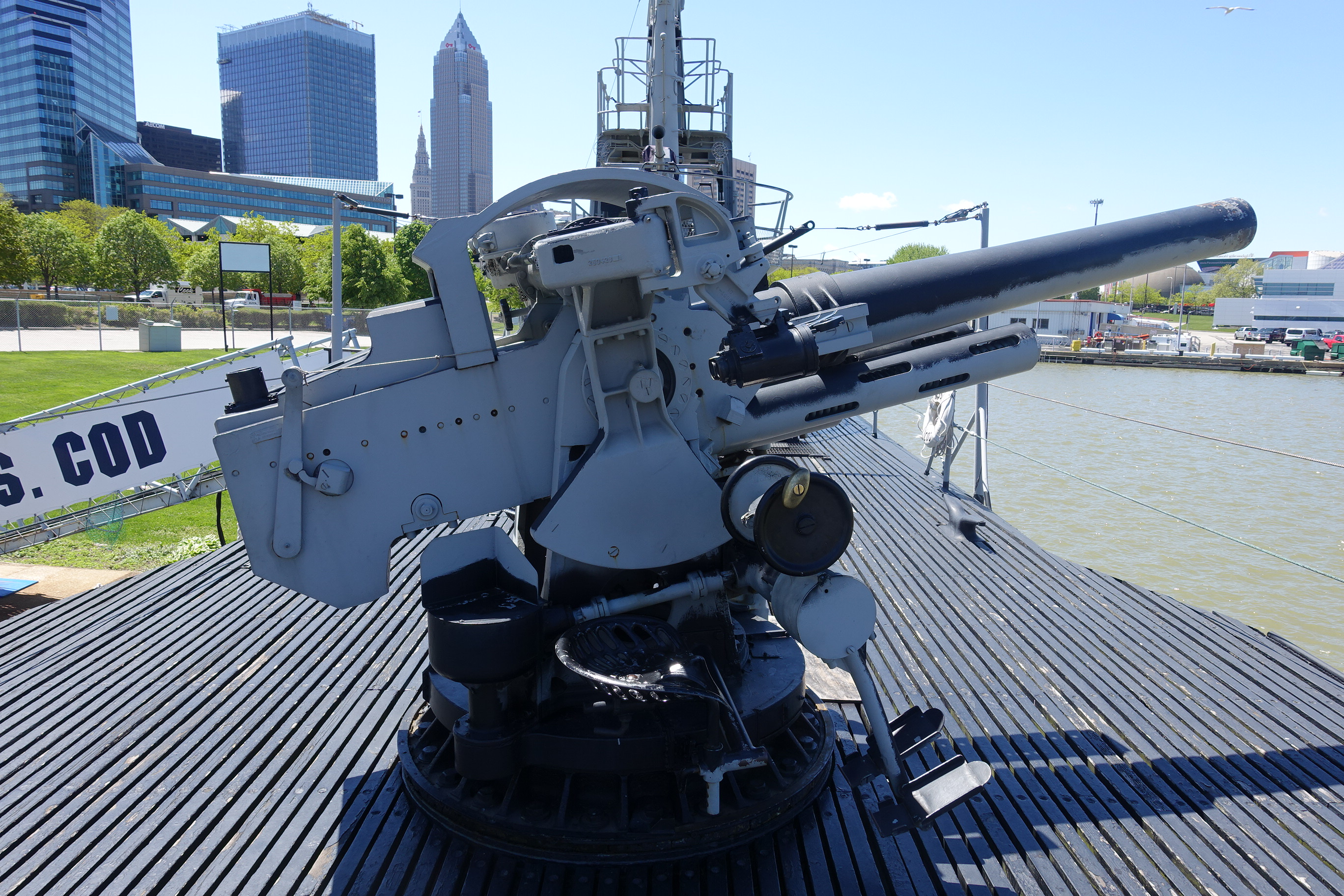
5-inch deck gun

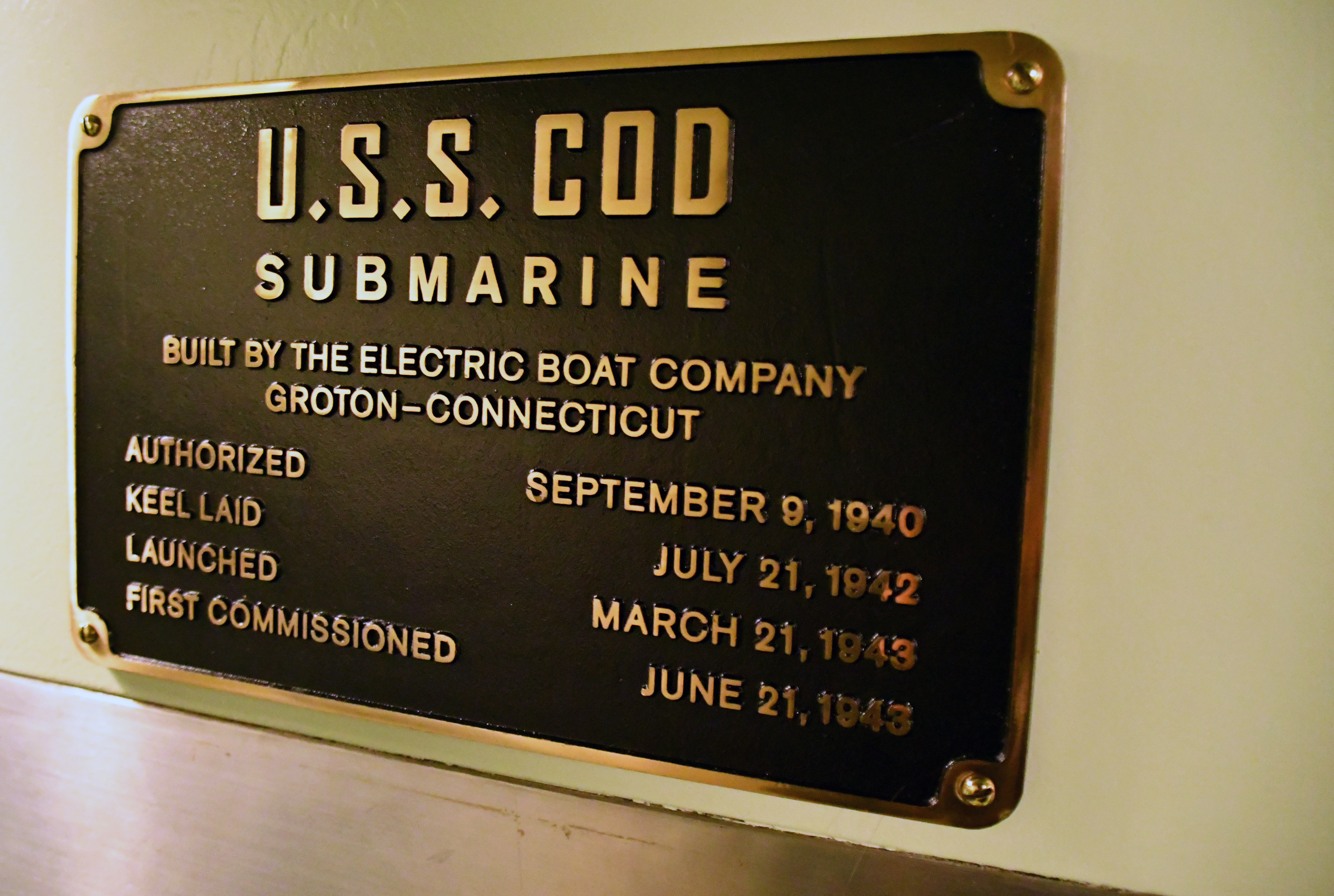
Cod's Builder Plate

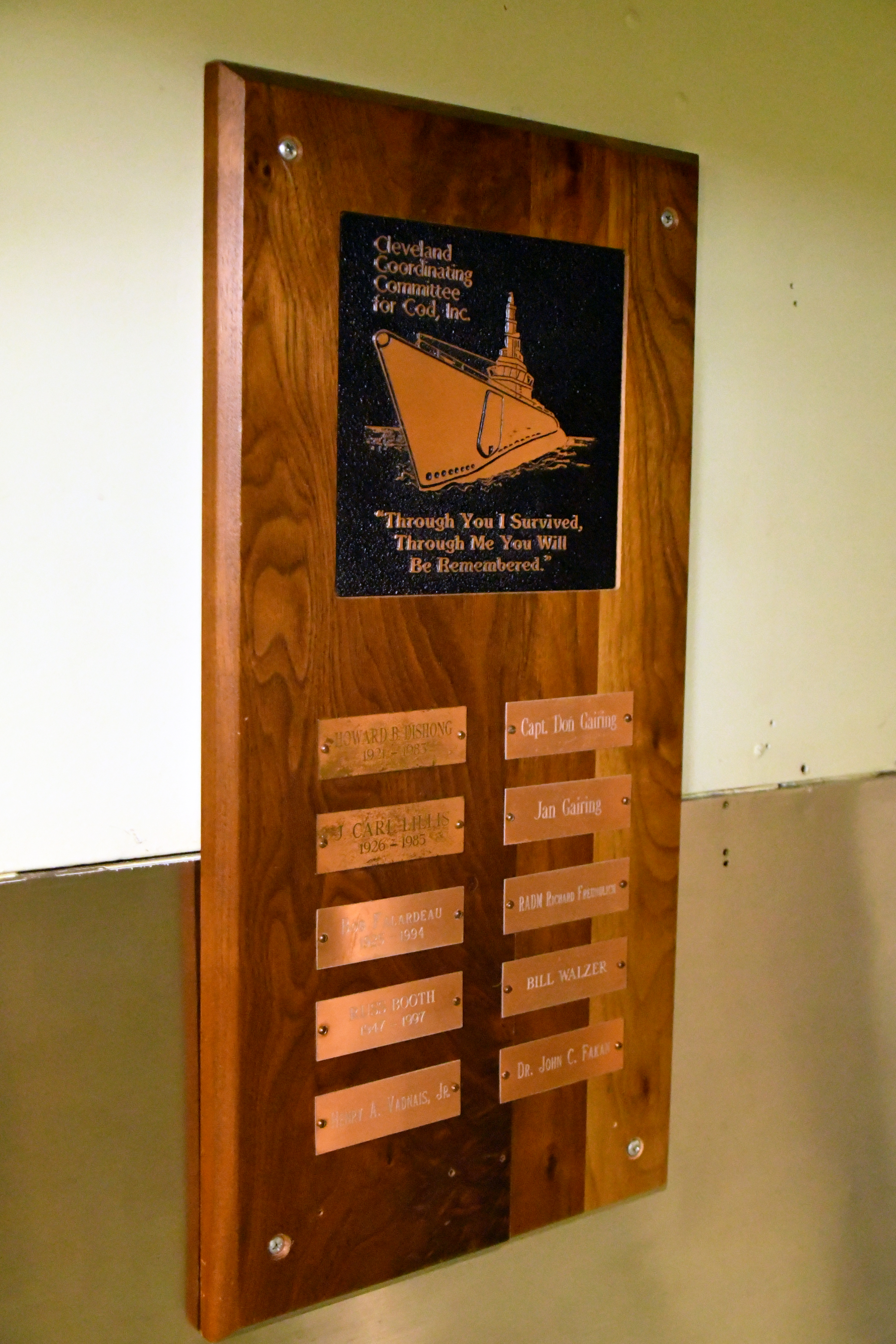
Cleveland Coordinating Committee for Cod, Inc. Plaque

== Appearances in popular culture ==
Cod was subject of the television series The Silent Service and was the main plot for an episode titled The USS Cod's Lost Boarding Party which aired on 30 May 1958 on NBC.

Cod was used for exterior and interior scenes for the Smithsonian Channel war documentary Hell Below to depict USS Tang, U-99 and U-100. Filming took place aboard the Cod in 2015. The documentary aired on 17 July 2016.

Cod was the subject of a two-part documentary on the World of Warships YouTube channel titled Naval Legends: USS Cod. The documentary published on 2 and 4 July 2019.

Cod was used for exterior and interior scenes for the Dolph Lundgren motion picture Operation Seawolf to depict World War II German U-Boats. The motion picture released on 7 October 2022.
