= Hell Below (TV series) =

- Genre: Historical documentary
- Directed by: Ian Herring
- No. of seasons: 3
- No. of episodes: 18

Production
- Producers: Ian Herring, Maija Leivo, Carolyn Schmidt

Original release
- Release: July 17, 2016

Hell Below is a TV series on The Smithsonian Channel produced by Parallax Film Productions Inc. The series is narrated by Canadian voice-over artist Mark Oliver, charting the stealth game of subsea warfare and the narrative from contact to attack of the greatest submarine patrols of World War II. Six initial episodes cover the rise of the Wolfpack to the drive for victory in the Pacific. Expert analysis and stock footage are woven with re-enactments filmed on authentic Second World War era submarines.

== Episodes ==
Season 01

- The Wolfpack - Germany's World War II U-Boat Aces play a deadly game of cat and mouse with the protectors of Allied merchant shipping. As the Wolfpack strategy evolves, so does Allied ASW technology.
- Hitler's Revenge - December 1941—following the Japanese assault on Pearl Harbor, Nazi U-boats set out on a secret mission to attack Allied shipping off the shores of the United States to thwart the American war effort.
- America Fights Back - On his first patrol aboard a new sub, Submarine Commander Dudley Morton risks everything in a bid to turn the tide of the Pacific War.
- Atlantic Showdown - Escort Commander J.G. Luther lacks sufficient ships to protect Allied shipping Convoy HX.229 when an unlucky accident reveals his position and sets the stage for the largest convoy battle of the Second World War.
- Destroyer Killer - American submarine skipper Sam Dealey takes on a high-stakes rescue mission deep in enemy waters.
- Fatal Voyage - America's top submarine, USS Tang braves a horrific blow that sparks an unforgettable fight to survive.

Season 02

- In Enemy Waters - An in-depth look at how the USS Silversides helped sink many freighters and having a pharmacist's mate perform a critical surgery on a fellow crew member.
- Submarine Sabotage - The USS Barb takes part in a series of audacious actions against the Japanese, including the first use of rockets on Japan and in another mission, the Barb lands crewmembers to sabotage a Japanese coastal railroad.
- U-Boat Killers - German U-boat ace Werner Henke and the crew of U-515 are hunted relentlessly by an American naval task group during the Battle of the Atlantic.
- Defying Rommel - HMS Upholder battles German and Italian forces in the Mediterranean to prevent supplies getting through to Rommel's Axis forces in Africa.
- Sub vs. Sub - After being intercepted on a secret mission to Japan, the Captain of German U-boat U-864 must use all his skills to evade British submarine HMS Venturer.
- Cuban Crisis - In October 1963, the Soviet submarine B-59 is detected trying to make it past the U.S. naval blockade of Cuba. American warships rush to intercept the B-59 - unaware the submarine is carrying a nuclear torpedo.

Season 03

- Enigma Capture - When Royal Navy warships force the German U-boat U-110 to surface — its crew must prevent the Enigma machine falling into British hands.
- Commander Down - After a collision with an armed Japanese supply ship, the commander of the USS Growler must make a difficult decision to save the stricken submarine and her crew.
- Killer Strike - During the first few days of WW2, German U-boat U-30 mistakenly sinks the civilian liner SS Athenia. Many Americans are killed in the incident — which risks drawing America into the conflict.
- Torpedo Rampage - The USS Parche's tenacious submarine Commander unleashes a series of devastating attacks against Japanese shipping in the Pacific.
- The Longest Journey - German U-boat U-862 causes havoc to Allied shipping during a cruise to the Far East.
- Iwo Jima Pilot Rescue - American submarines risk everything to rescue airmen shot down over the Pacific.

== Production ==
As it has many fully restored and working parts, the World War II museum ship Gato-class submarine USS Cod moored in Cleveland, Ohio was used for interior and exterior scenes to depict the USS Tang, U-99 and U-100.

The film crew travelled to Laboe, Germany to film in U-995, a Type VIIC/41 U-boat which is now used as a museum. HMCS Sackville, a small, surface vessel used as a museum in Halifax, Nova Scotia, was also used.

Much of the footage inside the submarines was filmed using hand-held cameras. Because space was so tight there was often no room for the director.
