= Paul King (screenwriter) =

American producer and screenwriter

- Born: Paul Donaldson King; July 14, 1926; Los Angeles, California, U.S.
- Died: July 10, 1996 (aged 69); Newport Beach, California, U.S.
- Education: Loyola Marymount University; University of Southern California
- Occupations: Producer, screenwriter

Paul Donaldson King (July 14, 1926 – July 10, 1996) was an American producer and screenwriter. He was nominated for an Academy Award in the category Best Original Screenplay for the film Operation Petticoat.

King died in July 1996 of cancer at his home in Newport Beach, California, at the age of 69. He was interred at Pacific View Memorial Park in Corona del Mar, Newport Beach.

== Selected filmography ==
- Operation Petticoat (1959; co-nominated with Stanley Shapiro, Maurice Richlin and Joseph Stone)
