= USS Tang (SS-306) =

Balao-class submarine

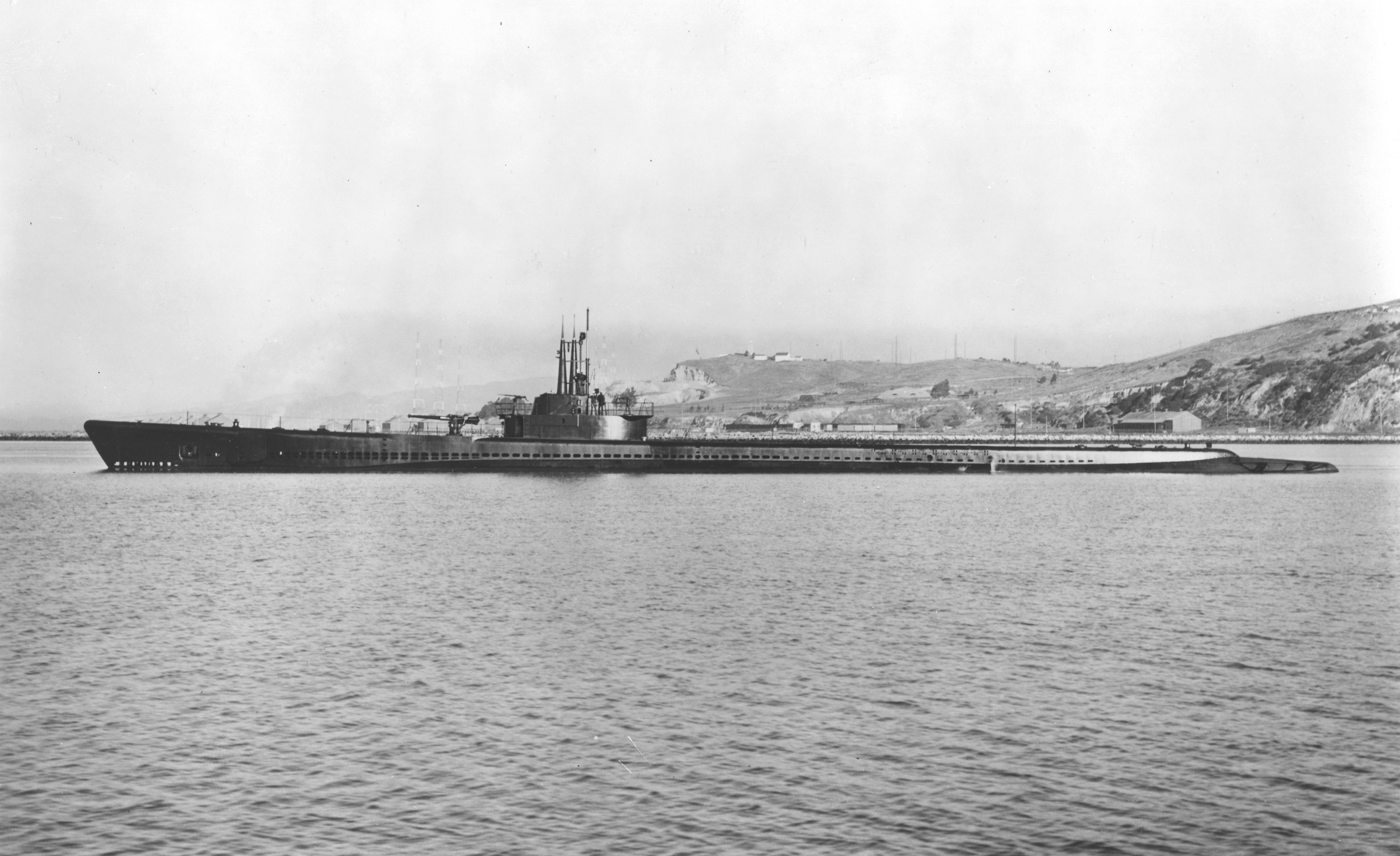
- USS Tang (SS-306) off Mare Island Navy Yard, December 1943

History

United States
- Name: USS Tang
- Namesake: Tang
- Ordered: 15 December 1941
- Builder: Mare Island Naval Shipyard
- Laid down: 15 January 1943
- Launched: 17 August 1943
- Commissioned: 15 October 1943
- Stricken: 8 February 1945
- Fate: Sunk by own torpedo off China in the Taiwan Strait, 25 October 1944

General characteristics
- Class & type: Balao-class diesel-electric submarine
- Displacement: 1,470 long tons (1,494 t) surfaced; 2,040 long tons (2,073 t) submerged
- Length: 311 ft 10 in (95.05 m)
- Beam: 27 ft 4 in (8.33 m)
- Draft: 16 ft 10 in (5.13 m) maximum
- Propulsion: 4 × Fairbanks-Morse Model 38D8-1/8 9-cylinder opposed-piston diesel engines driving electrical generators; 2 × 126-cell Sargo batteries; 4 × high-speed Elliott electric motors with reduction gears; 2 × propellers; 5,400 shp (4.0 MW) surfaced; 2,740 shp (2.04 MW) submerged
- Speed: 20.25 kn (23.30 mph; 37.50 km/h) surfaced; 8.75 kn (10.07 mph; 16.21 km/h) submerged
- Range: 11,000 nmi (13,000 mi; 20,000 km) surfaced at 10 kn (12 mph; 19 km/h)
- Endurance: 48 hours at 2 kn (2.3 mph; 3.7 km/h) submerged; 75 days on patrol
- Test depth: 400 ft (120 m) but dived below 600 ft (180 m)
- Complement: 10 officers, 68 enlisted
- Armament: 10 × 21-inch (533 mm) torpedo tubes; 6 forward, 4 aft; 24 torpedoes; 1 × 5-inch (127 mm) / 25 caliber deck gun; Bofors 40 mm and Oerlikon 20 mm cannon

USS Tang (hull number SS-306) was a Balao-class submarine of World War II, the first ship of the United States Navy to bear the name Tang. She was built and launched in 1943, serving until being sunk by her own torpedo off China in the Taiwan Strait on 24 October 1944.

In her short career in the Pacific War, Tang sank 33 ships totalling 116,454 tons. Commander Richard O'Kane received the Medal of Honor for her last two engagements (23 and 24 October 1944).

Tang was sunk during the last engagement by a circular run of her final torpedo, going down in 180 ft (55 m) of water; 78 men were lost while nine survivors were picked up by a Japanese frigate and taken as prisoners of war. This was the only known time that a Momsen lung was used to escape a sunken submarine.

== Construction ==
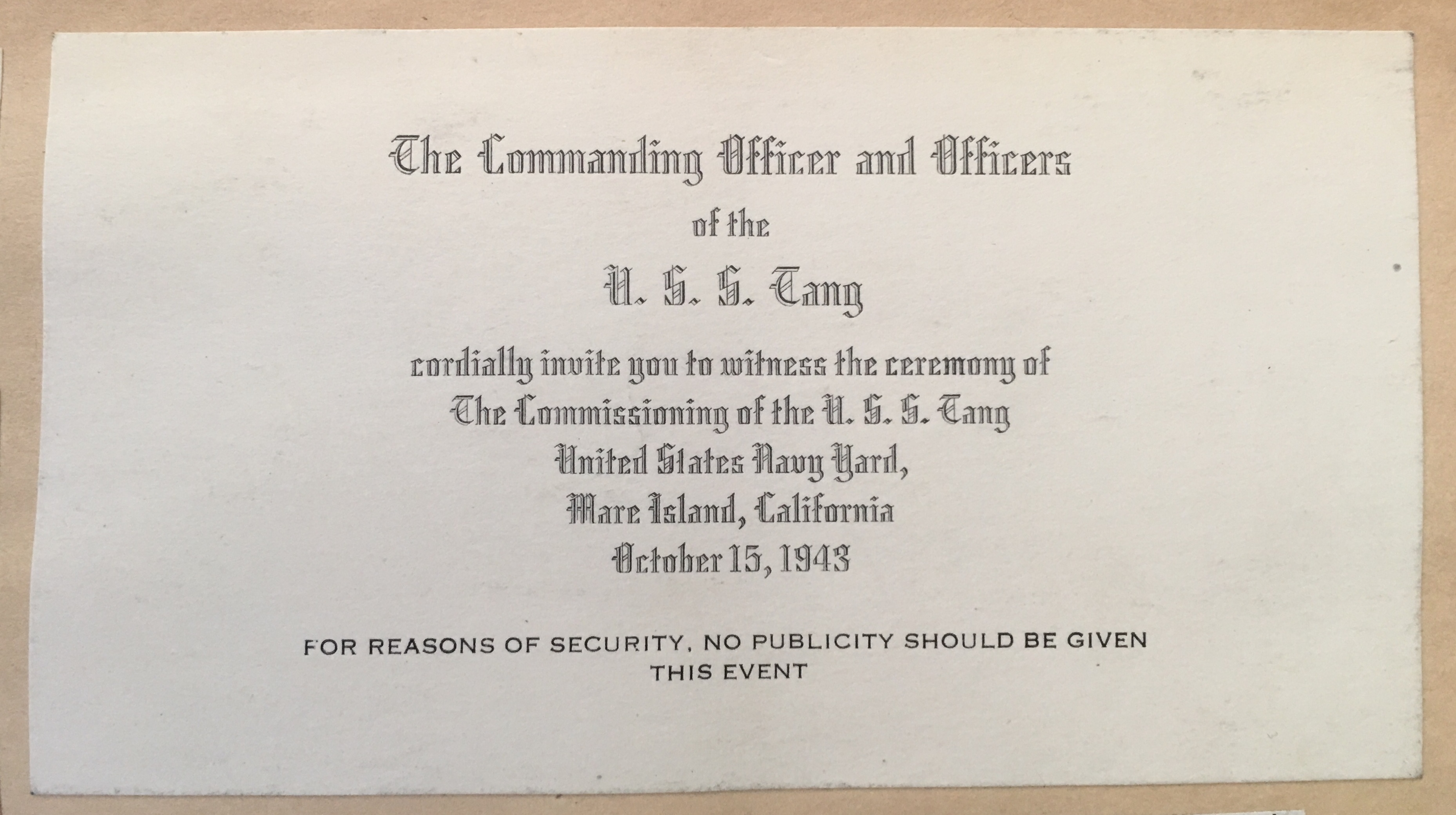
Original invitation for Tang's commissioning ceremony

The contract to build USS Tang was awarded to Mare Island Naval Shipyard on 15 December 1941, and her keel was laid down on 15 January 1943. She was launched on 17 August sponsored by Mrs. Alix M. Pitre, wife of Captain Antonio S. Pitre, director of research at the Mare Island Naval Shipyard, and commissioned on 15 October 1943 with Lieutenant Commander Richard O'Kane, former executive officer of Wahoo, in command, and delivered to the Navy on 30 November 1943.

Tang completed fitting out at Mare Island and moved south to San Diego for 18 days of training before sailing for Hawaii. She arrived at Pearl Harbor on 8 January 1944 and conducted two more weeks of exercises in preparation for combat.

== First war patrol ==
Tang departed Pearl Harbor on 22 January 1944 to begin her first war patrol, destined for the Caroline Islands-Mariana Islands area. On the morning of 17 February, she sighted a convoy of two freighters, five smaller ships, and their escort. The submarine tracked the convoy, plotted its course, and then prepared to attack. An escort suddenly appeared at a range of 7,000 yd (6,400 m) and closing. Tang went deep and received five depth charges before the escort departed. Unscathed, she returned to periscope depth and resumed the attack. The range on the nearest freighter closed to 1,500 yd (1,400 m), and Tang fired a spread of four torpedoes. Three hit, and Gyoten Maru (6,800 tons) sank by the stern. The submarine cleared the area by running deep and then attempted to get ahead of the convoy for a dawn attack, but the remaining freighter passed out of range, protected by aircraft.

During the night of 22 February, Tang made a surface attack on a convoy of three cargo ships and two escorts. She tracked the Japanese ships, through rain squalls that made radar almost useless, for 30 minutes before attaining a firing position, on the surface, 1,500 yd (1,400 m) off the port bow of a freighter. A spread of four torpedoes hit Fukuyama Maru (3,600 tons) from bow to stern, and the enemy ship disintegrated. Early the next morning, Tang made another approach on the convoy. The escort of the lead ship, the 6,800-ton Yamashimo Maru, moved from its covering position on the port bow, and the submarine slipped into it and fired four more torpedoes. The first hit the stern of the merchantman, the second hit just aft of the stack; and the third hit just forward of the bridge, producing a terrific secondary explosion. The ship was "twisted, lifted from the water", and began spouting flames as she sank.

On the morning of 24 February, Tang sighted a tanker, a freighter, and a destroyer. Rain squalls hampered her as she attempted to attain a good firing position, so she tracked the ships until after nightfall, then made a surface attack. She launched four torpedoes and scored three hits, which sank the Tatutaki Maru-class freighter. The two remaining ships commenced firing in all directions, and Tang submerged to begin evasive action. She shadowed the enemy until morning and then closed on the tanker for a submerged attack from extremely close range, just 500 yd (460 m), barely enough to allow her torpedoes to arm. Additional lookouts had been posted on the target's deck, and when the spread of torpedoes from Tang struck her, they were hurled into the air with other debris from the ship. Echizen Maru sank in four minutes as Tang went deep and rigged for the depth-charge attack that followed. During this evasion, a water leak developed in the forward torpedo room, and Tang exceeded her depth gauge maximum reading of 612 feet (187 m). The crew was able to get the submarine back under control and eventually return to the surface. (After the war, the Joint Army–Navy Assessment Committee (JANAC) denied credit for the tanker seen to explode.)

Tang contacted a convoy consisting of a freighter, transport, and four escorts on the evening of 26 February. She maneuvered into position to attack the wildly zigzagging transport and fired her last four torpedoes and believed she missed; JANAC credited her with sinking Choko Maru, a 1794-ton cargo ship. Having expended all 24 of her torpedoes and scored 16 hits, the submarine arrived at Midway for refit.

== Second war patrol ==
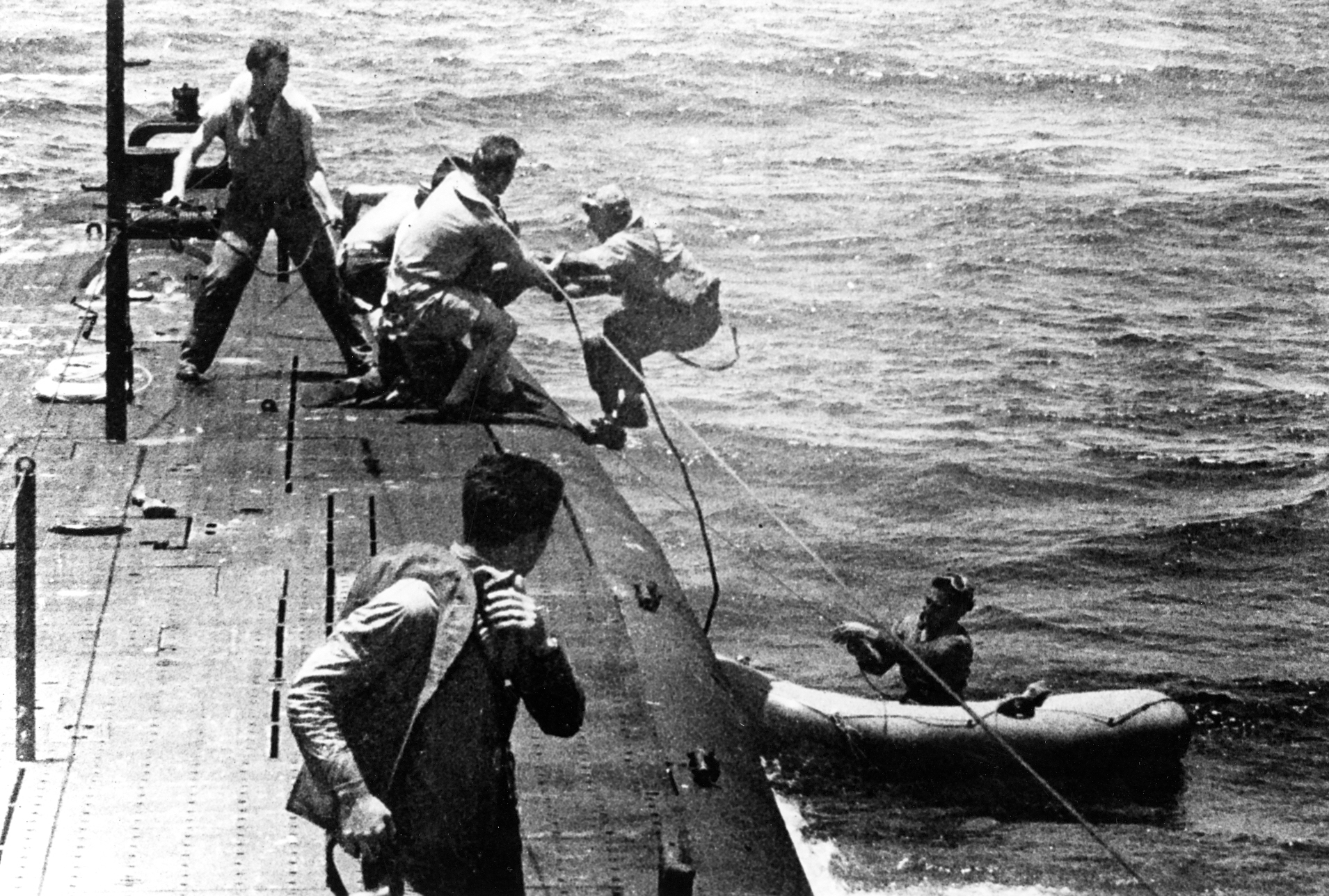
USS Tang rescuing airmen off Truk in May 1944

Tang's second patrol began on 16 March and took her to waters around the Palau Islands, to Davao Gulf, and to the approaches to Truk. She made five surface contacts, but had no chance to make any attacks. She was then assigned to lifeguard duty near Truk. Tang rescued 22 downed airmen, including some rescued by John Burns' Vought OS2U Kingfisher, and took them to Hawaii at the end of the patrol.

== Third war patrol ==
Tang departed Pearl Harbor on 8 June and stalked enemy shipping in the East China Sea and Yellow Sea areas. On 24 June, southwest of Kagoshima, the submarine contacted a convoy of six large ships guarded by 16 escorts. Tang closed for a surface attack and fired a spread of three torpedoes at one of the ships and then fired a similar spread at a second target. Explosions followed, and Tang reported two ships sunk. However, postwar examination of Japanese records revealed by the Japanese government show that two passenger-cargo ships and two freighters were sunk. The ships must have overlapped, and the torpedo spread must have hit and sunk two victims in addition to their intended targets. Those sunk – Tamahoko Maru, Tainan Maru, Nasusan Maru, and Kennichi Maru – added up to 16,292 tons of enemy shipping. Tamahoko Maru had 772 prisoners of war (POWs) (197 British, 42 American, 258 Australian and 281 Dutch). 560 POWs died. There were also some 500 Japanese soldiers on board. On 24 June 1944 at 11:50 pm, in the Koshiki Straits 40 miles (64 km) southwest of Nagasaki, Tamahoko Maru was torpedoed by USS Tang and sank in less than two minutes.

On 30 June, while she patrolled the lane from Kyūshū to Dairen, Tang sighted another cargo ship steaming without escort. After making an end-around run on the surface, which produced two torpedo misses, Tang went deep to avoid depth charges, then surfaced and chased the target until she closed the range to 750 yd (690 m). A single torpedo blew Nikkin Maru in half, and the transport ship sank, taking with her some 3,200 Japanese soldiers.

The next morning, Tang sighted a tanker and a freighter. While she sank the freighter Taiun Maru Number Two, the tanker Takatori Maru Number One fled. The submarine trailed the latter until dark, then she launched two torpedoes, which sank the tanker. Tang celebrated 4 July at dawn by an end-around, submerged attack on an enemy freighter that was near shore. However, with rapidly shoaling water and her keel about to touch bottom, Tang drew back, fired a spread of three with two hits, and then surfaced as survivors of the 6,886-ton cargo ship Asukazan Maru were being rescued by fishing boats. That afternoon, Tang sighted Yamaoka Maru, another cargo ship around the same size, and sank her with two torpedoes. The submarine surfaced, and with the aid of grapnel hooks and Thompson submachine guns, rescued a survivor who had been clinging to an overturned lifeboat. While prowling the waters off Dairen late the next night, the submarine sighted a cargo ship, and during a submerged attack with her last two torpedoes, sank Dori Maru. Credited with eight ships for 56,000 tons at the time, the score confirmed postwar by JANAC for her third patrol was 10 ships for a total of 39,160 tons.

== Fourth war patrol ==
Tang's fourth war patrol was conducted from 31 July – 3 September in Japanese home waters off the coast of Honshū. On 10 August, she fired a spread of three torpedoes at a tanker near the beach of Omaezaki, but scored no hits. The next day, after locating two freighters and two escorts, she launched three torpedoes at the larger freighter and two at the other. The larger freighter (Roko Maru) disintegrated, apparently due to a torpedo that exploded in her boilers. As the submarine went deep, her crew heard the fourth and fifth torpedoes hit the second ship. After a jarring depth-charge attack, which lasted 38 minutes, Tang returned to periscope depth. Only the two escorts were in sight, and one of them was picking up survivors.

On 14 August, Tang attacked a patrol yacht with her deck gun and reduced the Japanese ship's deck house to a shambles with eight hits. Eight days later, she sank a 225 ft (69 m) patrol boat (No. 2 Nansatsu Maru). On 23 August, the submarine closed in on a large ship; Japanese crewmen dressed in white uniforms could be seen lining its superstructure and the bridge. She fired three torpedoes, and two hits caused the 8,135-ton transport Tsukushi Maru to sink. Two days later, Tang attacked a tanker and an escort with her last three torpedoes, sinking the tanker, No. 8 Nanko Maru. Tang then returned to Pearl Harbor.

== Fifth war patrol and loss ==
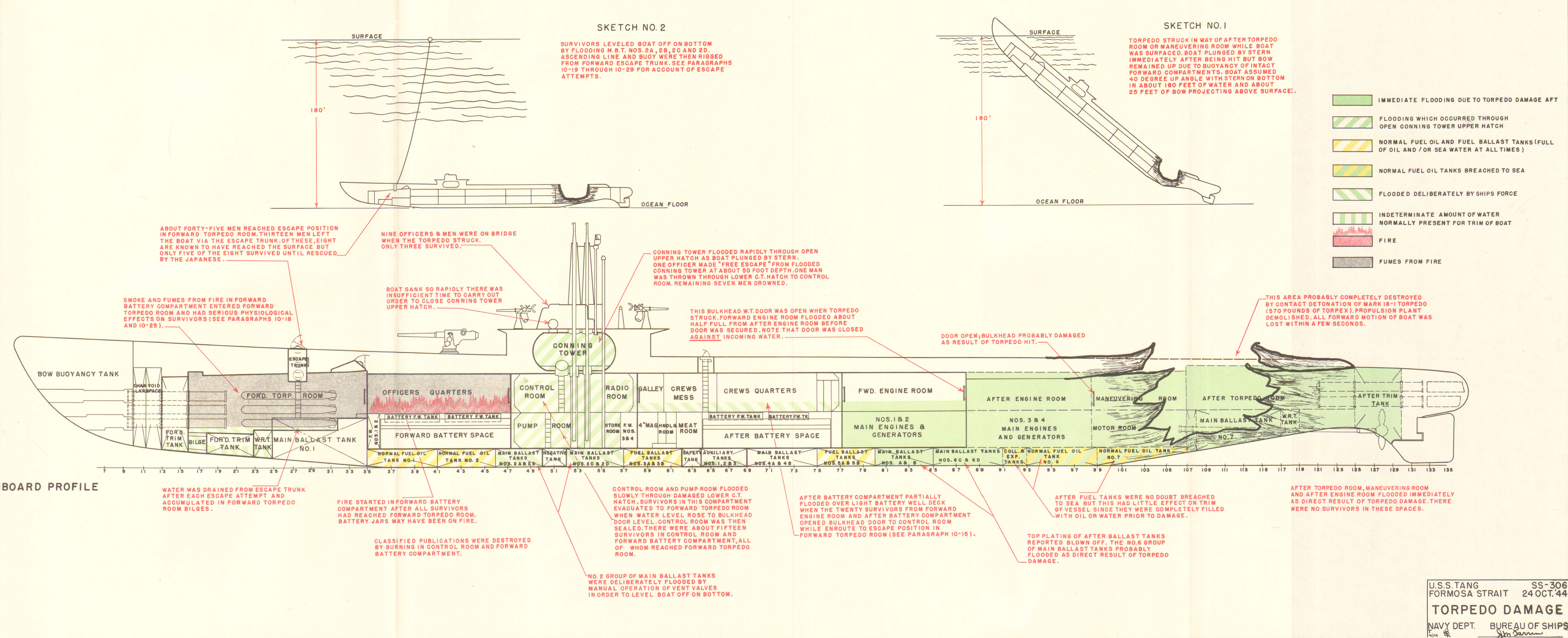
Damage to USS Tang from its own torpedo

After a refit, Tang stood out to sea on 24 September for her fifth war patrol. After topping off her fuel at Midway Island, she sailed for the Formosa Strait on 27 September. To reach her area, Tang had to pass through narrow waters known to be heavily patrolled by the Japanese. A large area stretching northeast from Formosa was known to have been mined by the enemy, and O'Kane was given the choice of making the passage north of the island alone, or joining a coordinated attack group (Silversides, Trigger, and Salmon, under Commander John S. Coye, Jr., flag in Silversides) which was to patrol off northeast Formosa, and making the passage with them. Tang chose to make the passage alone, and these vessels never heard from Tang, nor did any base, after she left Midway.

The story of Tang's fate comes from the report of her surviving commanding officer.

On the night of 10–11 October, Tang sank the cargo ships Joshu Go and Ōita Maru. The submarine continued on patrol until 23 October, when she contacted a large convoy consisting of three tankers, a transport, a freighter, and numerous escorts. Commander O'Kane planned a night surface attack. Tang broke into the middle of the formation, firing torpedoes as she closed on the tankers (later identified as freighters). Two torpedoes struck under the stack and engine room of the nearest, a single burst into the stern of the middle one, and two exploded under the stack and engine space of the farthest. The first torpedoes began exploding before the last was fired, and all hit their targets, which were soon either burning or sinking. As the submarine prepared to fire at the tanker crossing her stern, she sighted the transport bearing down on her in an attempt to ram. Tang had no room to dive, so she crossed the transport's bow, and with full left rudder, saved her stern and got inside the transport's turning circle. The transport was forced to continue her swing to avoid the tanker, which had also been coming in to ram. The tanker struck the transport's starboard quarter shortly after the submarine fired four stern torpedoes along their double length at a range of 400 yd (370 m). The tanker sank bow first and the transport had a 30°-up angle. With escorts approaching on the port bow and beam and a destroyer closing on the port quarter, Tang rang up full speed and headed for open water. When the submarine was 6,000 yd (5,500 m) from the transport, another explosion was observed, and its bow disappeared.

On the morning of 24 October, Tang began patrolling at periscope depth. She surfaced at dark and headed for Turnabout Island (25.431493°N 119.93989°E). On approaching the island, the submarine's surface search radar showed so many blips that it was almost useless. Tang soon identified a large convoy, which contained tankers with planes on their decks and transports with crated planes stacked on their bows and sterns. As the submarine tracked the Japanese ships along the coast, the convoy's escorts became suspicious, and the escort commander began signaling with a large searchlight. This illuminated the convoy, and Tang chose a large, three-deck transport as her first target, a smaller transport as the second, and a large tanker as the third. Their ranges varied from 900 to 1,400 yd (820 to 1,280 m). After firing two torpedoes at each target, the submarine paralleled the convoy to choose her next victims. She fired stern torpedoes at another transport and tanker aft.

As Tang poured on full speed to escape the gunfire directed at her, a destroyer passed around the stern of the transport and headed for the submarine. The tanker exploded, and a hit was seen on the transport. A few seconds later, the destroyer exploded, either from intercepting Tang's third torpedo or from shell fire of two escorts closing on the beam. Only the transport remained afloat, dead in the water. The submarine cleared to 240 ft (73 m), rechecked the last two torpedoes that had been loaded in the bow tubes, and returned to finish off the transport. The 23rd torpedo was fired at 900 yd (820 m) and was observed running hot, straight, and normal. Tang's score for the night was later confirmed as the freighters Kogen Maru (6,600 tons) and Matsumoto Maru (7,000 tons).

At 02:30 on 25 October, the 24th and last torpedo (a Mark 18 electric torpedo) was fired. It broached and curved to the left in a circular run. Tang fishtailed under emergency power to clear the turning circle of the torpedo, but it struck her abreast the aft torpedo room about 20 seconds after it was fired. The explosion was violent, and men as far forward as the control room received broken limbs. The ship went down by the stern with the aft three compartments flooded. Of the nine officers and men on the bridge, including O'Kane, three were able to swim through the night until picked up eight hours later. One officer escaped from the flooded conning tower and was rescued with the others.

The submarine bottomed at 180 ft (55 m) and the 30 survivors crowded into the forward torpedo room as the aft compartments flooded, intending to use the forward escape trunk. Publications were burned, and all assembled in the forward room to escape. The escape was delayed by a Japanese patrol, which dropped depth charges, and started an electrical fire in the forward battery. Beginning at 06:00 on 25 October, using the Momsen lung, the only known case where it was used, 13 men escaped from the forward torpedo room. By the time the last had exited, the heat from the battery fire was so intense, paint on the bulkhead was scorching, melting, and running down. Of the 13 men who escaped from the forward torpedo room, only five were rescued. One sailor who was near the group of five, but injured during the ascent, was not rescued. Three who were on the bridge were rescued after swimming for 8 hours. Another survivor escaped the conning tower and used his pants as a flotation device. In total, 78 men were lost. Those who escaped the submarine were greeted in the morning by the sight of the bow of the transport they sank the previous night sticking straight out of the water.

One of the 78 men lost was Rubin MacNiel Raiford, who was only 15.

Nine survivors, including O'Kane, were picked up the next morning by Japanese frigate CD-34. Other accounts report that only eight men, including O'Kane, were rescued. Survivors of Tang's previous sinkings were on board, and they beat the men from Tang. O'Kane stated, "When we realized that our clubbing and kickings were being administered by the burned, mutilated survivors of our handiwork, we found we could take it with less prejudice." The nine captives were placed in a prison camp at Ōfuna until the end of the war, where they were interrogated by Japanese intelligence.

Tang was stricken from the Naval Vessel Register on 8 February 1945. As is traditional for US submarines lost at sea, Tang was not decommissioned and officially remains on "Eternal Patrol".

== Awards ==
Tang received four battle stars and two Presidential Unit Citations for World War II service. Her commanding officer, Richard O'Kane, received the Medal of Honor for Tang's final combat action.

During the war, Tang was credited with sinking 31 ships in her five patrols, totaling 227,800 tons, and damaging two for 4,100 tons. This was unequaled among American submarines. Postwar comparison with Japanese records by the JANAC reduced this to 24 ships, totaling 93,824 tons, placing her second on the list for ships sunk after USS Tautog (with 26) and fourth behind USS Flasher, Rasher, and Barb for total confirmed tonnage. These figures have since been revised to 33 ships totalling 116,454 tons, placing her first in the list of the most successful American submarines in World War II for both number of ships and tonnage. Tang also retains the best patrol by number of ships sunk, her third, with 10 for 39,100 tons.

== In popular culture ==
- In the 1951 movie Submarine Command, the opening scenes show a submarine with the hull number SS-306 in the mothball fleet at Mare Island. For the film, SS-306 is named Tiger Shark, and is portrayed by USS Sterlet (SS-392), another Balao-class submarine.
- Tang was the subject of two episodes of the syndicated television anthology series The Silent Service, which aired during the 1957–1958 season. The two episodes depict Tang's second and fifth patrols. Tang is also featured in the episode "Fatal Voyage" of the Smithsonian Channel series Hell Below.
- Tang is one of several submarines (along with the era's USS Bowfin, Growler, Seawolf, and Spadefish) whose war patrols can be re-enacted in the 1985 MicroProse computer game Silent Service and the game's various ports, including Konami's 1989 release for the Nintendo Entertainment System.
- Tang also appears as a playable submarine during a quick mission in Silent Hunter 4: Wolves of the Pacific.
- The sinking of the Tang was the subject of the 2010 musical piece "Escape from the Deep" by composer Brian Balmages.
- Diagrams from the report into the sinking of the USS Tang made a brief appearance in the 2023 film Godzilla Minus One to represent the USS Redfish, which was destroyed during its pursuit of Godzilla when one of its torpedoes performed a circular run.
- In the documentary series Hell Under the Sea by National Geographic, the USS Tang was the plot for episode three, season one.

== Museums ==
Tang has been memorialized as part of a special interactive exhibit at The National WWII Museum in New Orleans, called "Final Mission". Visitors enter into a simulated recreation of the submarine, are given a card corresponding to one of the 87 men who crewed the boat during its fifth (and final) patrol, and are assigned a station to crew. The events of 24–25 October 1944 are depicted on an overhead screen, while the visitor "crew" is given tasks to complete. The recreation includes the circular run of the 24th torpedo, which returned to hit Tang and sink the boat. Upon exiting the simulator, visitors see a wall with pictures of the crew, and can learn if the sailor associated with their card survived the attack.
