= USS Spearfish =

Submarine of the United States

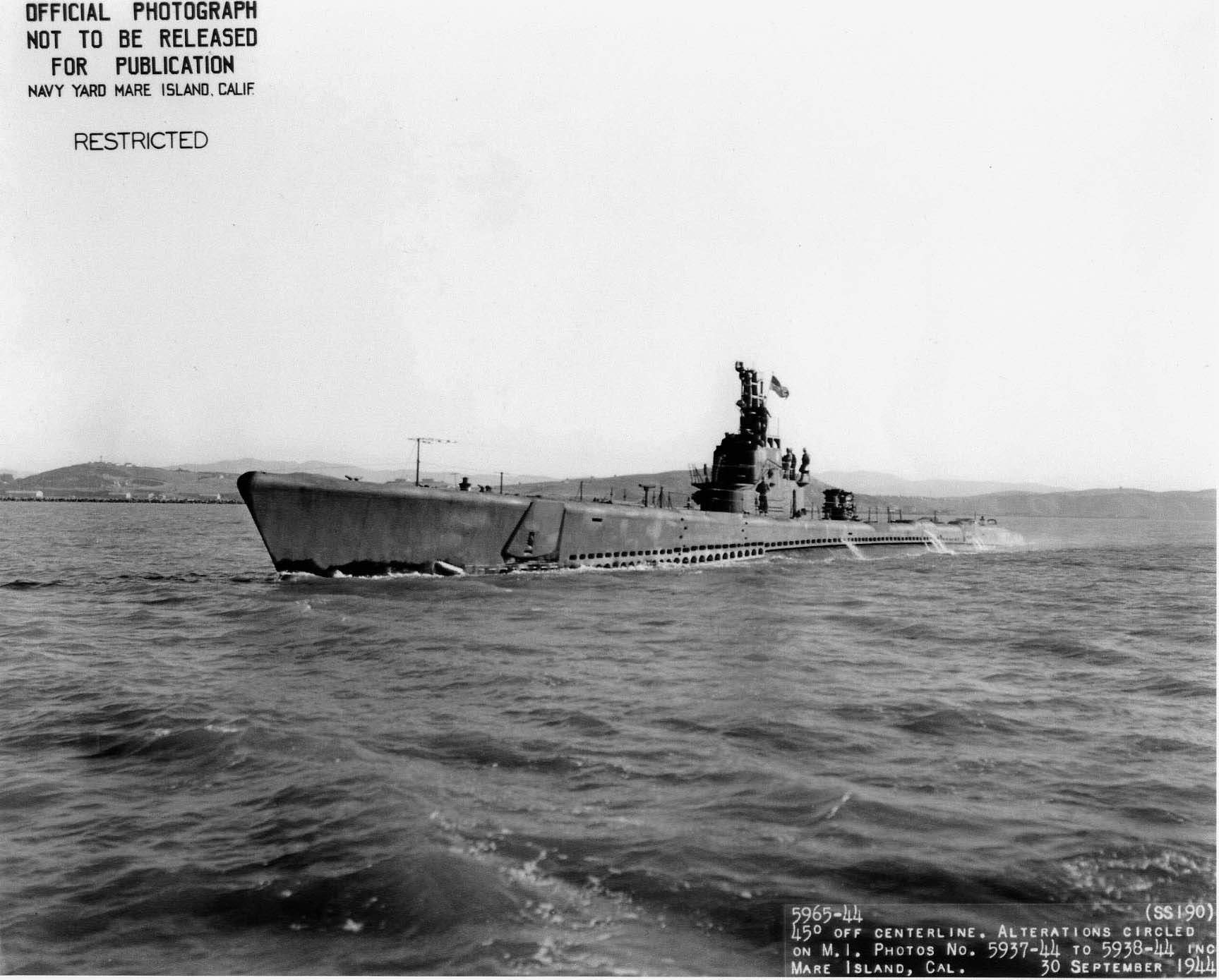

History

United States
- Builder: Electric Boat Company, Groton, Connecticut
- Laid down: 9 September 1937
- Launched: 29 October 1938
- Commissioned: 19 July 1939
- Decommissioned: 22 June 1946
- Stricken: 19 July 1946
- Fate: Sold for scrap, 19 May 1947

General characteristics
- Class & type: Sargo-class composite diesel-hydraulic and diesel-electric submarine
- Displacement: 1,450 long tons (1,470 t) standard, surfaced; 2,350 long tons (2,390 t) submerged
- Length: 310 ft 6 in (94.64 m)
- Beam: 26 ft 10 in (8.18 m)
- Draft: 16 ft 7 1/2 in (5.067 m)
- Propulsion: 4 × Hooven-Owens-Rentschler (H.O.R.) 9-cylinder diesel engines (two hydraulic-drive, two driving electrical generators); 2 × 126-cell Sargo batteries; 4 × high-speed General Electric electric motors with reduction gears; two shafts; 5,500 shp (4.1 MW) surfaced; 2,740 shp (2.0 MW) submerged
- Speed: 21 knots (39 km/h) surfaced; 8.75 knots (16 km/h) submerged
- Range: 11,000 nautical miles (20,000 km) at 10 knots (19 km/h)
- Endurance: 48 hours at 2 knots (3.7 km/h) submerged
- Test depth: 250 ft (76 m)
- Complement: 5 officers, 54 enlisted
- Armament: 8 × 21 inch (533 mm) torpedo tubes; (four forward, four aft); 24 torpedoes; 1 × 3 in (76 mm) / 50 caliber deck gun; four machine guns

USS Spearfish (SS-190), a Sargo-class submarine, was the only ship of the United States Navy to be named for the spearfish, any of several large, powerful, pelagic fishes of the genus Tetrapturus allied to the marlins and sailfishes.

== Construction and commissioning ==
Spearfish′s keel was laid down on 9 September 1937 by the Electric Boat Company in Groton, Connecticut. She was launched on 29 October 1938, sponsored by Mrs. Lillian Spear, wife of Lawrence Y. Spear, president of Electric Boat Company. Spearfish was commissioned on 17 July 1939.

== Pre-World War II service ==
Spearfish conducted sea trials off New London, Connecticut, and then held her shakedown cruise in the Guantanamo Bay area from 21 August to 3 October. She was overhauled at the Portsmouth Navy Yard in Kittery, Maine, from 1 November 1939 to 2 February 1940. On 10 February, she set sail for the West Coast. After training operations in the San Diego, California, training area from 6 March to 1 April, the submarine sailed to Pearl Harbor.

== First and second war patrols ==
Spearfish operated between Hawaii and the West Coast until 23 October 1941, when she departed Pearl Harbor and headed for Manila. She conducted training operations there from 8 November until the outbreak of war on 8 December (7 December east of the International Date Line), when she began her first war patrol. This mission took her into the South China Sea, near Saigon and Cam Ranh Bay, French Indochina, and off Tarakan and Balikpapan, Borneo. On 20 December, Spearfish encountered a Japanese submarine and made a submerged attack. She fired four torpedoes, but all missed the target. She put into Surabaja, Java, on 29 January 1942 for refitting.

On 7 February, she began her second war patrol. Spearfish patrolled in the Java Sea and Flores Sea and made unsuccessful torpedo attacks on two cruiser task forces. On 2 March, she put into Tjilatjap, Java, and took on board 12 members of the staff of the commander of the submarines of the Asiatic Fleet, for transportation to Australia. The patrol ended at Fremantle, Western Australia.

== Third-sixth war patrols ==
Her third war patrol, from 27 March to 20 May, took her to the Sulu Sea and Lingayen Gulf. On 17 April, she sank an enemy cargo ship of about 4,000 tons, and on 25 April, she sank Toba Maru, a 6,995-ton freighter.

On the night of 3 May, the submarine slipped into Manila Bay and picked up 14 nurses, and several staff officers from Corregidor. She was the last American submarine to visit that beleaguered fortress before it surrendered. Navy nurse and Legion of Merit recipient Ann A. Bernatitus was among the 27 rescued by Spearfish.

From 26 June to 17 August, she scouted the South China Sea for enemy shipping, and from 8 September to 11 November, searched the west coast of Luzon, where she damaged two freighters.

Spearfish sailed from Brisbane on 2 December 1942 and patrolled in the New Britain-New Ireland area for over a month before entering Pearl Harbor on 25 January 1943. From Oahu, she was directed to Mare Island for a major overhaul, which lasted from 3 February to 19 May.

== Seventh-ninth war patrols ==
Spearfish returned to Pearl Harbor on 26 May, and began her seventh war patrol from there on 5 June. She cruised the Truk Island area, made a photographic reconnaissance of Eniwetok Atoll, and then patrolled in the vicinity of Marcus Island. After refitting at Midway Island from 1 August to 25 August, Spearfish searched Japanese home waters south of Bungo Suido for shipping. On the night of 10 and 11 September, she made a submerged torpedo attack on a convoy of seven freighters escorted by one destroyer and two torpedo boats. The submarine fired torpedoes at four ships, and damaged two. Spearfish was attacked with depth charges throughout the day, but finally eluded the escorts. On the night of 17 and 18 September, she attacked another convoy of seven ships with their escorts, sinking two and damaging one. Upon concluding this patrol, the ship sailed to Pearl Harbor for refitting.

From 7 November to 19 December, Spearfish performed photographic reconnaissance of Jaluit, Wotje, and Kwajalein, Marshall Islands, to aid the coming invasion of those islands. On 5 and 6 December, she acted as lifeguard submarine for air strikes on Kwajalein and Wotje.

== Tenth-twelfth war patrols ==
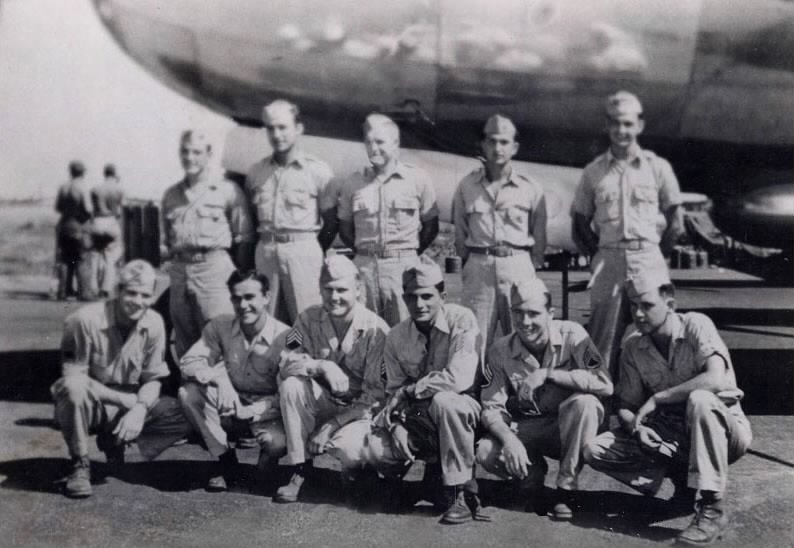
Bricker Crew (B-29) Z-1 "Pee Wee" 1944. Left to right, back row: CPT Linden O. Bricker, 2LT Kenneth R. Chidester, 2LT Jay L. Meikle, 2LT Jack O. Mueller, 2LT Clifford B. Smith. Front row: SGT Edmund G. Smith, CPL Emory A. Forrest, CPL William F. Frank, CPL Stephen J. Darienzo, SSG Richard J. Grinstead, CPL John C. Estes

Spearfish’s 10th war patrol was made south of Formosa from 17 January to 29 February 1944. On 30 January, she made two torpedo attacks on a convoy of three merchantmen and two escorts. She sank an escort and the passenger-cargo ship, Tomashima Maru. On 10 February, her attack on a convoy of four ships and their escorts damaged a freighter and sank a transport. The next day, she damaged another freighter in an 11-ship convoy. On 12 February, she crippled another freighter.

Spearfish sailed on her 11th war patrol from Pearl Harbor, 31 March, for the East China Sea and the area north of Nansei Shoto. On 5 May, she sank a freighter, and the following day, she sank the cargo ship, Toyoura Maru. When the submarine returned to Pearl Harbor on 27 May, she was routed to the West Coast for a major overhaul. After spending from 6 June to 3 October at the Mare Island Navy Yard, the ship returned to Pearl Harbor on 10 October and held training exercises for a month.

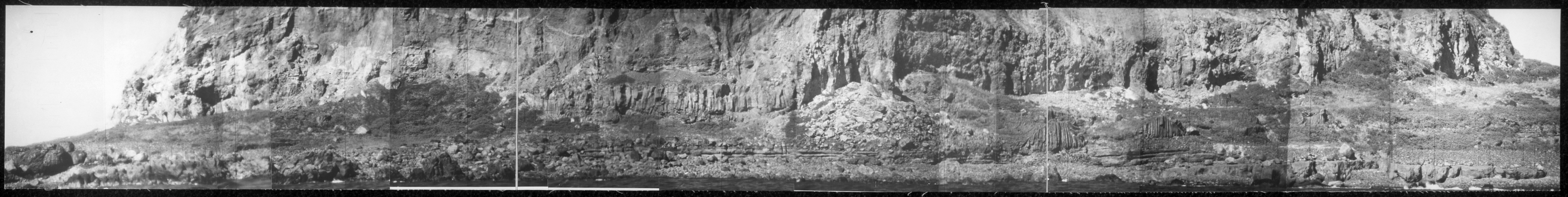
Reconnaissance photo of Iwo Jima, taken from USS Spearfish

Spearfish’s last war patrol took place from 12 November 1944 to 24 January 1945. On the first part of the patrol, she made photographic reconnaissance surveys of Iwo Jima and of Minami Jima. The submarine spent the second part in the Nanpō Islands area on lifeguard duties and offensive patrolling. She was on the surface 23 nautical miles (43 km; 26 mi) east-southeast of Iwo Jima at 24°40′N 141°39′E at 17:15 on 28 November 1944 when a United States Army Air Forces B-24 Liberator bomber attacked her with rockets and strafed her. Her officer of the deck observed a large explosion plume 700 yards (640 m) from Spearfish just before she submerged.

On 19 December 1944, Spearfish rescued seven survivors (CPT Linden O. Bricker, 2LT Kenneth R. Chidester, 2LT Jay L. Meikle, 2LT Clifford B. Smith, SGT Edmund G. Smith, CPL Stephen J. Darienzo, and SSG Richard J. Grinstead) from a ditched B-29 Superfortress, Z-1 Pee Wee. Four airmen were killed during the ditching (2LT Jack O. Mueller, CPL Emory A. Forrest, CPL William F. Frank, and CPL John C. Estes). This marked the first submarine rescue of downed B-29 airmen in the Pacific theater of operations during World War II.

On 11 January 1945, Spearfish's guns sank a sampan. She took three Japanese on board as prisoners, but one died several days later. LCDR C.C. Cole, commanding officer of the Spearfish, noted in the ship's log at Tanapag Harbor, Saipan, on 13 January that he returned the seven airmen to their quarters under jubilant escort from their squadron.

== Fate ==
When she returned to Pearl Harbor on 24 January, Spearfish was used as a training ship until 18 August. On 19 August, she got underway for the West Coast and arrived at Mare Island on 27 August. On 7 September, a Board of Inspection and Survey recommended that she be decommissioned immediately and possibly scrapped. She was retained in an inactive status for experimental explosive tests. The tests were cancelled, and Spearfish was decommissioned at Mare Island on 22 June 1946. She was stricken from the Naval Vessel Register on 19 July 1946, sold to the Lerner Company of Oakland, California, and scrapped in October 1947.

== Honors and awards ==
- Asiatic-Pacific Campaign Medal with 10 battle stars for World War II service

== In media ==
Spearfish is the subject of an episode of the syndicated television anthology series, The Silent Service, which aired in syndication in the United States during the 1957-1958 season.
