= Arthur S. Carpender =

United States Navy vice admiral (1884–1960)

Arthur Schuyler Carpender
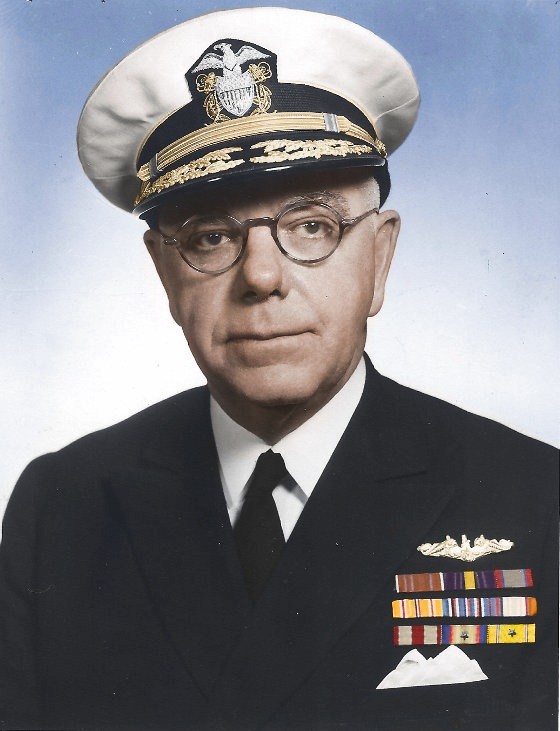
- Vice Admiral Arthur S. Carpender
- Born: 24 October 1884; New Brunswick, New Jersey, U.S.
- Died: 10 January 1960 (aged 75); Washington, D.C., U.S.
- Burial place: Arlington National Cemetery
- Military career
- Allegiance: United States
- Branch: United States Navy
- Service years: 1908–1946
- Rank: Admiral
- Nickname: Chips
- Service number: 0-6600
- Commands: Ninth Naval District; Seventh Fleet; Destroyers, Atlantic Fleet; Destroyer Squadron 31; Destroyer Squadron 32; USS Northampton; USS Macdonough; Submarine Division 14; USS Maddox; USS Radford; USS Fanning
- Conflicts: Mexican Revolution: United States occupation of Veracruz; World War I: Action of 17 November 1917; World War II: Battle of the Atlantic; New Guinea Campaign
- Awards: Navy Distinguished Service Medal; Army Distinguished Service Medal; Legion of Merit (2); Commander of the Order of the British Empire (Australia); Distinguished Service Order (United Kingdom); Grand Officer of the Order of Orange-Nassau (Netherlands)

Arthur Schuyler Carpender (24 October 1884 – 10 January 1960) was an American admiral who commanded the Allied Naval Forces in the Southwest Pacific Area during World War II.

A 1908 graduate of the United States Naval Academy, Carpender sailed around the world with the Great White Fleet. He commanded a landing force that went ashore at Puerto Cortes, Honduras in 1911, and participated in the United States occupation of Veracruz as adjutant of the First Regiment of Bluejackets in 1914. As commander of the destroyer USS Fanning in the action of 17 November 1917 during World War I, he engaged the U-boat U-58, and forced it to surrender.

At the start of World War II Carpender was Commander Destroyers, Atlantic Fleet. In July 1942, he arrived in the Southwest Pacific Area, where he became commander of Task Force 51, the naval forces based in Western Australia. In September 1942, he was appointed commander of the Southwest Pacific Force, later renamed the Seventh Fleet, and Allied Naval Forces, Southwest Pacific Area, which he led through the Battle of Buna–Gona and the Battle of the Bismarck Sea. The following year he oversaw the fleet's operations during Operation Cartwheel. He commanded the Ninth Naval District from January 1944 until August 1945, retiring in November 1946 with a tombstone promotion to the rank of admiral.

== Early life ==
Arthur Schuyler Carpender was born in New Brunswick, New Jersey, the sixth of seven children of John Neilson Carpender and his wife Anna Neilson (née Kemp) on 24 October 1884. His uncle was William Carpender, president of the Sixth Avenue Railroad. He was a direct descendant of Wolphert Gerretse Van Kouwenhoven, one of the early settlers the New Netherland colony.

He was educated at St. Paul's School in Concord, New Hampshire, and Rutgers Preparatory School in New Brunswick. Carpender was appointed to the United States Naval Academy by Senator John Kean in 1904. He graduated in 1908.

== Career ==
At the time of his graduation from the Naval Academy, midshipmen had to serve two years service at sea before being commissioned, so he reported for duty with the crew of the new battleship USS Minnesota. This was one of the battleships of the Great White Fleet sent by President Theodore Roosevelt on an epic voyage around the world in 1907. In 1909, Carpender was transferred to the USS Marietta. He was commissioned as an ensign in the United States Navy on 6 June 1910. Amidst the backdrop of the Banana Wars, he commanded a 16-man landing force from the Marietta that was put ashore at Puerto Cortes, Honduras, on 14 January 1911 to help protect American citizens during a period of unrest; after four days ashore Carpender's force returned to the ship.

Leaving the Marietta in March 1911, Carpender was involved with the fitting out of the new battleship USS Utah. Like other naval officers of the day, he acquired a nickname, "Chips" (a traditional nickname for a ship's carpenter in the days of wooden ships).

=== World War I ===
Carpender participated in the United States occupation of Veracruz in April 1914 during the Mexican Revolution as adjutant of the First Regiment of Bluejackets, which was formed from sailors from Florida, Utah and Arkansas. Landing mid-morning on 21 April, the sailors remained under fire on the beachhead until early the next morning when they began their advance through Veracruz. After a series of street fights, they captured the town shortly before noon on 22 April. The town was cleared and defense lines established before it was handed over to United States Army troops on 30 April. On returning to the United States, Carpender was assigned to the Office of Naval Militia Affairs in Washington, D.C.

In June 1916, Carpender helped fit out and commission the new destroyer USS Davis at the Bath Iron Works in Bath, Maine. He served as a member of its crew until March 1917, when he assumed command of the destroyer USS Fanning. During the action of 17 November 1917, he engaged the U-boat U-58, which was forced to the surface and compelled to surrender. For his part in the engagement, Carpender was awarded the Navy Distinguished Service Medal.

In December 1917, Carpender became an aide to the Commander, Destroyer Flotillas Operating in European Waters. In August 1918 he reported to the Newport News Shipbuilding and Drydock Company to help fit out the new destroyer USS Radford, and assumed command of the ship when it was commissioned on 30 September 1918. The ship sailed for Europe in October 1918, escorting a convoy.

=== Between the wars ===
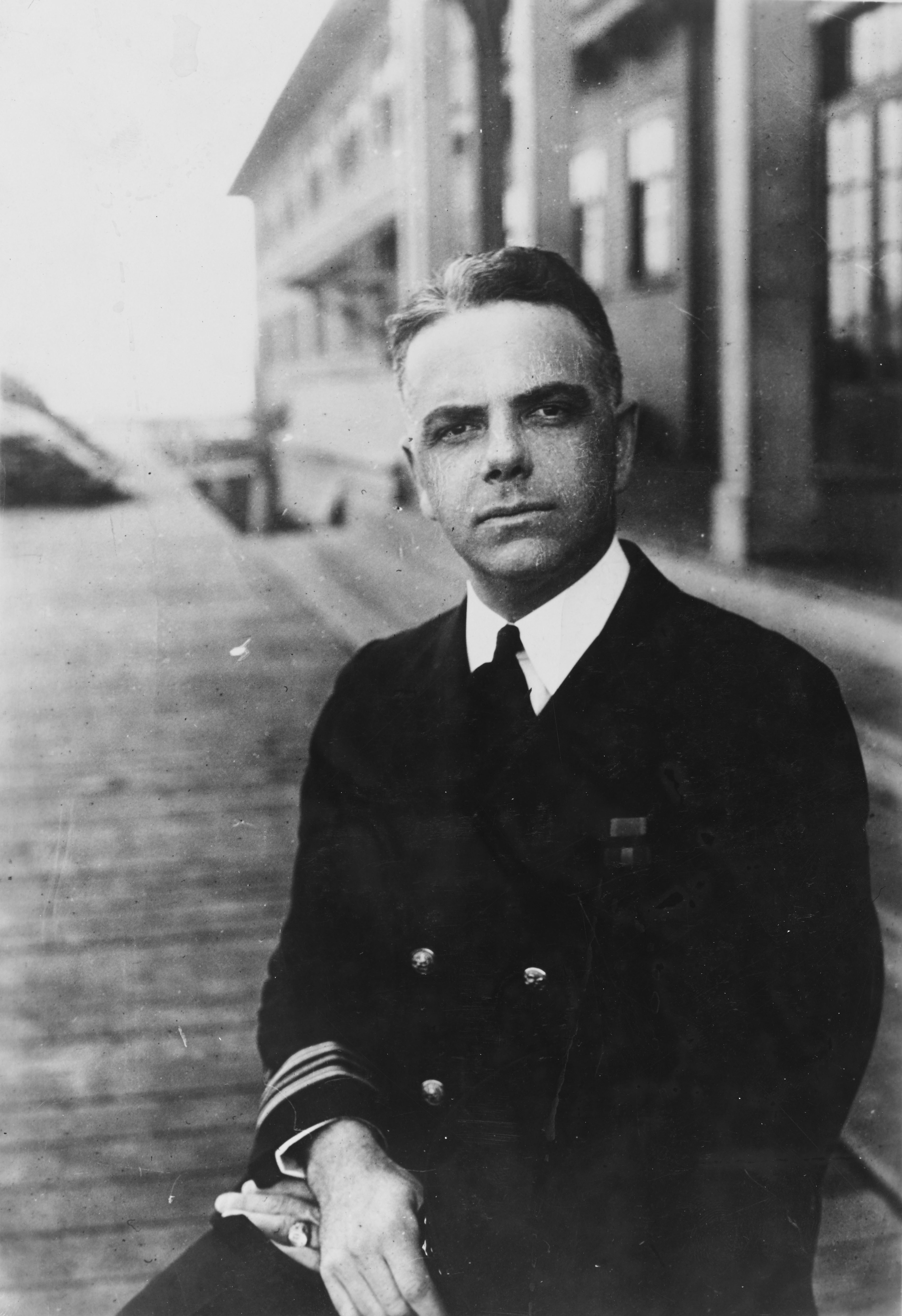
Lieutenant Commander Arthur S. Carpender, USN in 1928.

Carpender returned to the United States in April 1919, and became a Member of the Naval Examining Board, and Judge Advocate General of the General Court Martial at the Naval Training Station Great Lakes. In August 1921 he assumed command of the USS Maddox. He reported to the Naval Submarine Base New London for training in June 1922, after which he was posted to the United States Asiatic Fleet as commander of Submarine Division 14.

In August 1923 Carpender returned to Washington, D.C., where he served ashore for the next two years in the Bureau of Navigation, before becoming executive officer of the USS Pittsburgh in December 1925. He was assigned to the Receiving Ship, New York, from October 1926 until March 1927, when he assumed command of the destroyer USS Macdonough.

Following the familiar pattern of shore duty alternating with sea duty, Carpender served in the Office of the Chief of Naval Operations in Washington, D.C. from 1928 until 1931. This was followed by two years as executive officer of the light cruiser USS Omaha. He then attended the Naval War College at Newport, Rhode Island, after which he returned to the Office of the Chief of Naval Operations. In June 1936, he became Chief of Staff of Destroyers, Scouting Force. He assumed command of the cruiser USS Northampton in August 1937. In February 1938 he became Professor of Naval Science and Tactics of the Naval Reserve Officers Training Corps at Northwestern University at Evanston, Illinois.

=== World War II ===
Carpender returned to sea duty in September 1939, when he helped fit out a new destroyer squadron, Destroyer Squadron 32. He commanded it until September 1940, when he became Director of Officer Personnel at the Bureau of Navigation. In this capacity, he helped foster the careers of many other officers. In December 1941 he was promoted to rear admiral, as Commander Destroyers, Atlantic Fleet.

In July 1942, Carpender arrived in the Southwest Pacific Area, where he reported to Vice Admiral Herbert F. Leary, the commander of the Southwest Pacific Force and Allied Naval Forces, Southwest Pacific Area. Leary assigned Carpender to replace Captain Charles A. Lockwood in command of the naval forces based in Western Australia, known as Task Force 51. The main U.S. naval forces based in the west were the submarines, which remained under Lockwood. As a submariner himself, Carpender took a great interest in submarine operations, and did not like what he saw. Carpender and Lockwood did not get along well, and soon came to detest one another. "I've heard about how they run things in the Atlantic Fleet", Lockwood wrote, "so often that I'm ready to shoot any Atlantic Fleet sailor on sight—and they, after all, haven't done so much to write home about."

On 11 September 1942, Carpender succeeded Leary as commander of both the Southwest Pacific Force and the Allied Naval Forces, Southwest Pacific Area. In the former role, he reported to the Commander in Chief, United States Fleet, Admiral Ernest J. King; in the latter he was answerable to the Commander in Chief, Southwest Pacific Area, General Douglas MacArthur. The new post came with a promotion to the rank of vice admiral, but Carpender was not the most senior naval officer in the theater, as the Royal Australian Navy′s Admiral Sir Guy Royle and the Royal Netherlands Navy's Vice Admiral Conrad Helfrich both outranked him. The Southwest Pacific Force was small; when Carpender assumed command, it consisted of just five cruisers, eight destroyers and 20 submarines.

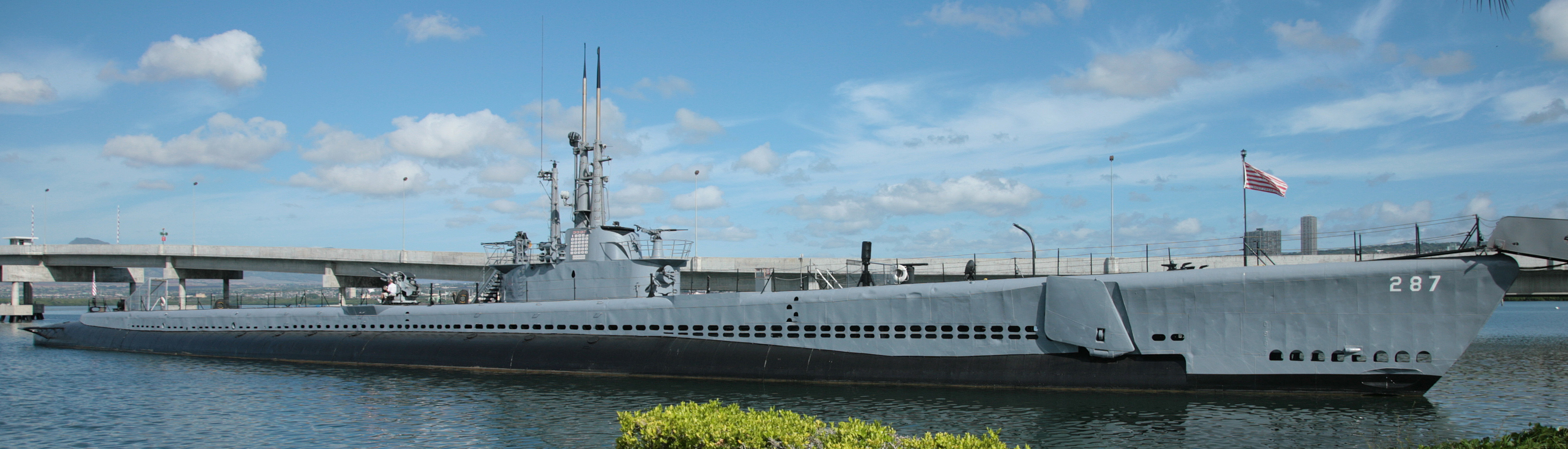
USS Bowfin, one of the submarines based in Western Australia

Leary's reluctance to risk his ships, and his habit of communicating directly with King without going through MacArthur's General Headquarters (GHQ) in Brisbane, had aroused the ire of MacArthur. Carpender would soon find himself involved in similar conflicts. In October, Carpender rebuffed a request for the Allied Naval Forces to transport troops to Cape Nelson. Carpender refused as there was no adequate hydrographic survey of that part of the Papuan coast, making it dangerous to sail at night, and movements in the area by day were subject to attack from Japanese aircraft. A survey was conducted in October and lighters and luggers began making their way up the coast to Cape Nelson, escorted on occasion by Royal Australian Navy corvettes.

In November 1942, Carpender turned down a similar request from the Commander of Allied Land Forces, General Sir Thomas Blamey, for the Allied Naval Forces to escort some small transports to Oro Bay, as the Imperial Japanese Navy was doing during the Battle of Buna–Gona. However, Carpender subsequently relented somewhat and, starting in December, small ships escorted by corvettes carried out Operation Lilliput to deliver vital supplies to Oro Bay. During the Pacific Military Conference in March 1943, MacArthur's chief of staff, Major General Richard K. Sutherland, spoke to Admiral King and expressed his dissatisfaction with Carpender.

On 15 March 1943, the Southwest Pacific Force, known colloquially as "MacArthur’s Navy", became the Seventh Fleet. It remained very small. The Seventh Fleet acquired an amphibious force under the command of Rear Admiral Daniel E. Barbey. This eventually became the VII Amphibious Force, but for some time most of its strength was only on paper, or en route to Australia from the United States. Observing the capabilities of PT boats during his evacuation from the Philippines, MacArthur encouraged their use, although initial results were disappointing. Carpender made effective use of them during the Battle of the Bismarck Sea on 25 March 1943.

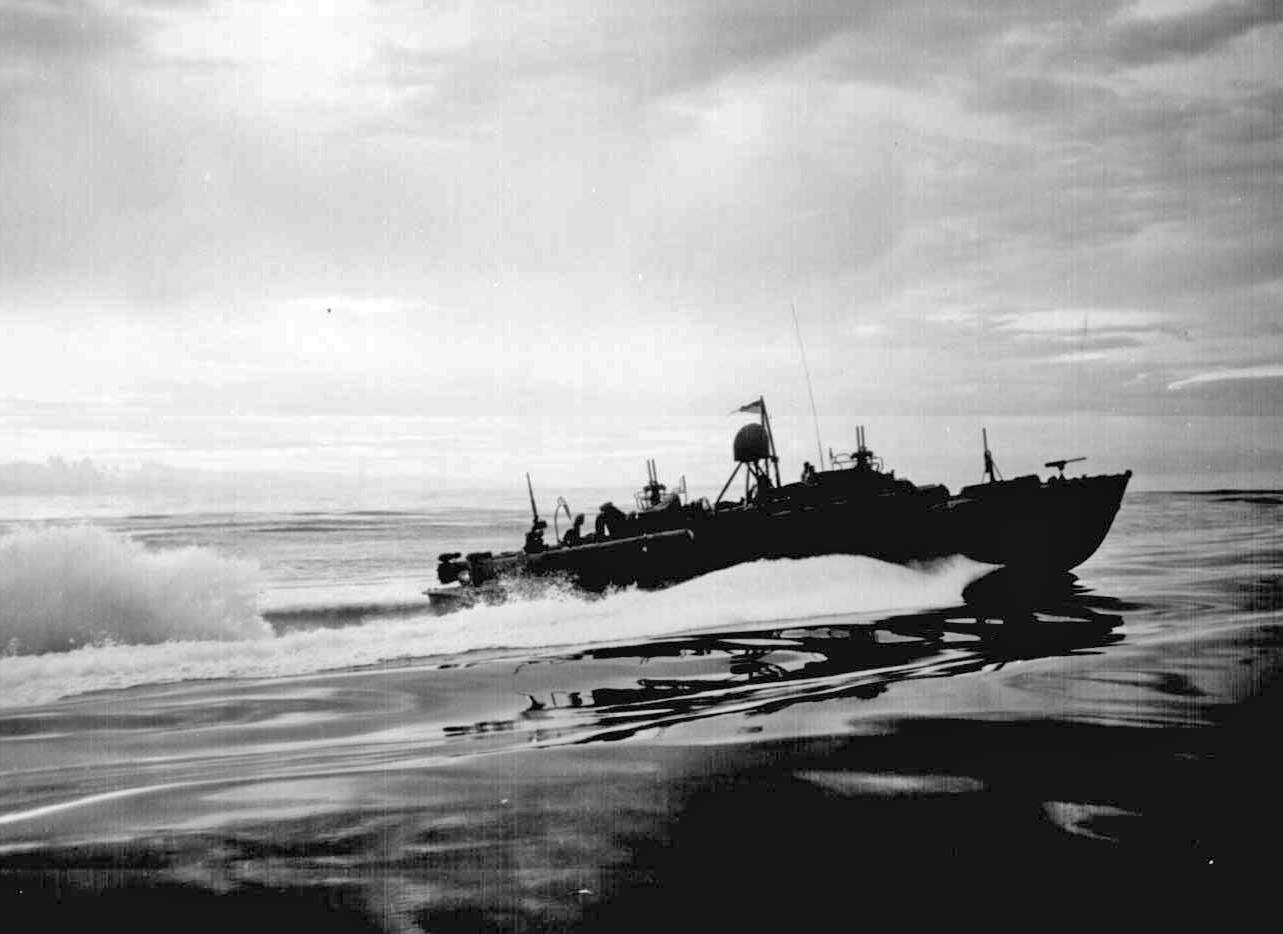
A PT boat patrols off New Guinea, 1943

Carpender oversaw the Seventh Fleet's operations during the early stages of Operation Cartwheel, MacArthur's advance towards the main Japanese base at Rabaul. A crisis arose during the Battle of Finschhafen, when Carpender became reluctant to reinforce the Australian position. As the situation at Finschhafen became increasingly precarious, Lieutenant General Sir Edmund Herring grew frustrated with Carpender's attitude, and appealed to Blamey, who in turn took up the matter with MacArthur. On 29 September 1943, Carpender agreed to use high-speed transports to send an additional battalion to Finschhafen, and the crisis passed. Carpender told Lieutenant General Frank Berryman that he "resented the implication that Uncle Sam's Navy was letting [the Australians] down at Finschhafen."

Carpender was replaced by Admiral Thomas C. Kinkaid on 26 November 1943. For his services in the Southwest Pacific, he was awarded the Army Distinguished Service Medal by MacArthur, and the Legion of Merit by the Navy. He was also appointed an honorary Commander of the Order of the British Empire on the recommendation of the Australian government, and a Grand Officer of the Order of Orange-Nassau by the Netherlands. He returned to the United States, where he commanded the Ninth Naval District from 3 January 1944 until 31 August 1945, for which he was awarded a second Legion of Merit.

=== Later life ===
Carpender's last naval assignment was as Coordinator of Public Relations in the Office of the Secretary of the Navy from 28 May 1946. He retired from the Navy on 1 November 1946, with a tombstone promotion to the rank of admiral. He lived in retirement in Washington, D.C. until his death.

In 1948, he was elected Superintendent of the private, college-prep school Admiral Farragut Academy in Pine Beach, New Jersey (today located in St. Petersburg, Florida), succeeding Brig. Gen. C. S. Bradford.

== Personal life ==
On 30 April 1912, Carpender married Helena Bleecker Neilson, who was also from New Brunswick. Their marriage produced no children.

Carpender died in Washington on 10 January 1960, and was buried in Arlington National Cemetery. His papers are held by the New Jersey Historical Society.
