= Tollberg =

Tollberg may refer to:

== People with the surname ==
- Brian Tollberg (born 1972), American professional baseball player
- Maynard W. Tollberg (1904–1943), United States Navy sailor who received a posthumous Navy Cross for his actions during World War II

== Ships ==
- USS Tollberg (DE-593), a United States Navy destroyer escort converted during construction into the high-speed transport USS Tollberg (APD-103)
- USS Tollberg (APD-103), a United States Navy high-speed transport in commission from 1945 to 1946
