= Battle Effectiveness Award =

Military award for ships and other units

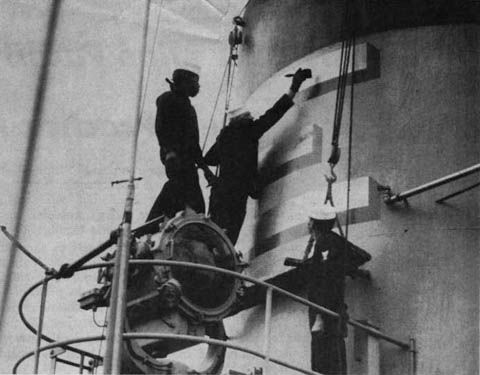
Crewmembers paint a gold "E" on the stack of USS Rankin

The Battle Effectiveness Award (formerly the Battle Efficiency Award, commonly known as the Battle "E"), is awarded annually to the small number of United States Navy ships, submarines, aviation, and other deployable combat coded units that win their battle effectiveness competition.

The criterion for the Battle Effectiveness Award is the overall readiness of the command to carry out its assigned wartime tasks, and is based on a year-long evaluation. The competition for the award is, and has always been, extremely keen. To win, a ship, aviation squadron, or unit must demonstrate the highest state of battle readiness.

The Battle Effectiveness Award recognizes sustained fast and winning performance in an operational environment within a command. To qualify for Battle "E" consideration, a command must win a minimum of four of the six Command Excellence awards and be nominated by their immediate superior in command. Eligibility for the award demands day-to-day demonstrated excellence in addition to superior achievement during the certifications and qualifications conducted throughout the year. A command's performance during training exercises, weapons inspections, and tactical readiness examinations are among the 16 different areas that are considered in the competition.

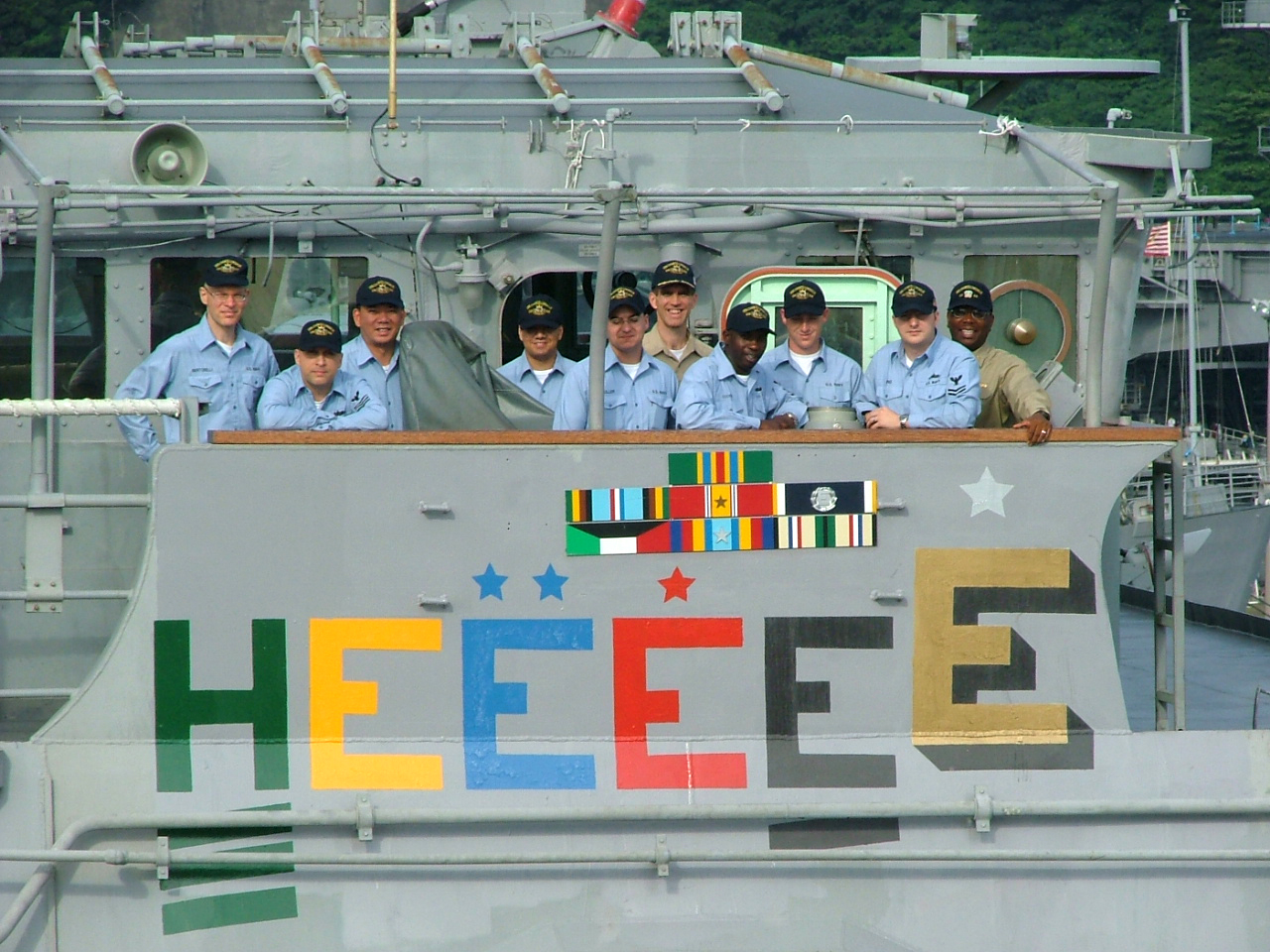
Crew members aboard the guided missile cruiser USS Chancellorsville (CG-62) assemble on the ship's bridge wing to admire the painting of a gold "E". The painted green H is for the Force Health and Wellness Unit Award

Ships that win a battle effectiveness competition are authorized to paint a white "E" with black shadowing on their bridge wings or stacks to display evidence of the honor. Aviation units will paint the same color insignia or simply a black "E" on at least one of their aircraft (often the aircraft with the air wing commander's or squadron commanding officer's name on it). It may also be displayed on signage, such as on a squadron hangar. Because the U.S. Navy no longer paints identifying hull numbers, vessel names, or other markings on its submarine fleet, submarines that are Battle E recipients will display it as a temporary signage, along with temporary hull numbers and a vessel name board, during unique events such as a change of command.

For each subsequent consecutive competition won, the ship, aviation squadron, or other command paints an angled line, or hashmark, below the white "E". The very rare winners of five consecutive "E"s replace the white "E" and hashmarks with a gold "E" and silver star just above. The "E" and any hashmarks are removed in the year the command first fails to win the award.

Personnel of ships, aviation squadrons, and other units that win the Battle "E" are authorized to wear the Navy "E" Ribbon and Battle "E" Device. From 1951 to 1976, Navy enlisted personnel at pay grade E-6 and below wore a small cloth "E" on their uniform sleeves (naval officers, chief petty officers, and all Marine Corps personnel wore nothing), with hashmarks and color corresponding to that on their ship or unit.

The latest revision of the Surface Forces Training Manual (SURFORTRAMAN) has changed the name of the Battle Efficiency Award to the Battle Effectiveness Award for COMNAVSURFOR ships.

== Command Excellence Awards ==
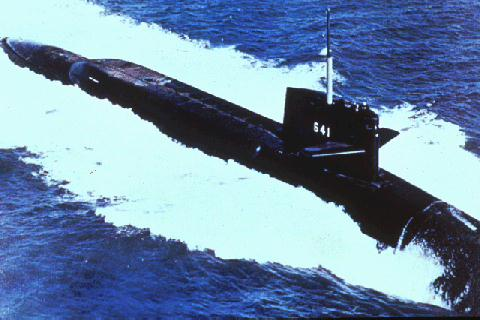
USS Simon Bolivar (SSBN-641) awarded with the Battle "E" for most outstanding ballistic missile nuclear submarine in 1974, 1975 and 1976

In addition to the Battle "E," a ship's earned Command Excellence Awards are painted and displayed on the port and starboard side of the bulwark, aft of the Battle "E." They are:

- Black "E" = Maritime Warfare/Defense Excellence Award (surface ships); Aircraft Maintenance Excellence (aircraft carriers)
- Red "E" = Engineering/Survivability Excellence Award
- Green "E" = Command & Control Excellence Award
- Green "H" = Health and Wellness (Medical) Excellence Award
- Blue "E" = Logistics Management Excellence Award
- Yellow "E" = Commander, Naval Surface Forces (CNSF) Ship Safety Award
- Purple "E" = Efficiency Excellence Award

Aviation units may also display additional aviation-unique Command Excellence Awards on their aircraft or squadron signage ashore:

- Black "A" = Airborne Antisubmarine Warfare Excellence Award
- Black "S" = Aviation Safety Excellence Award

== See also ==
- Battenberg Cup
- Marjorie Sterrett Battleship Fund Award
