= Waldemar F. A. Wendt =

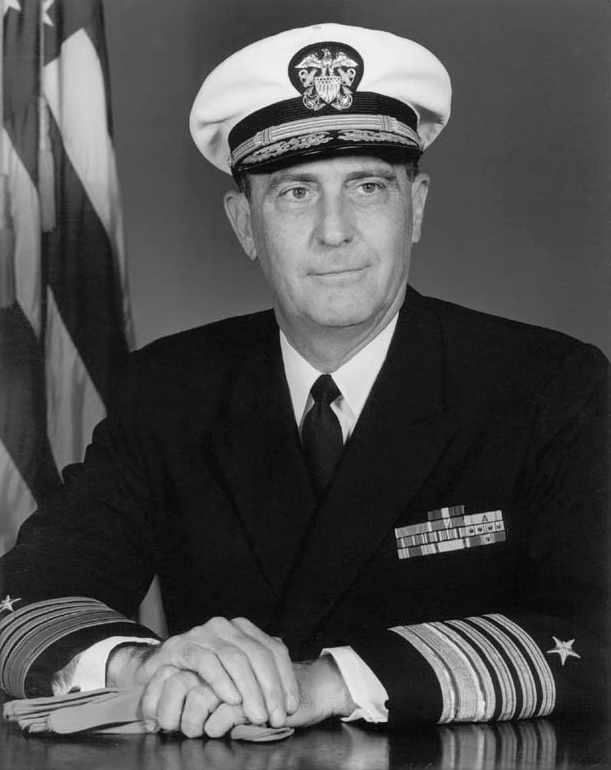
- Admiral Waldemar F. A. Wendt
- Born: March 15, 1912; Millstadt, Illinois, U.S.
- Died: October 21, 1997 (aged 85); Virginia Beach, Virginia, U.S.
- Military career
- Allegiance: United States
- Branch: United States Navy
- Service years: 1933–1971
- Rank: Admiral
- Commands: United States Naval Forces Europe; Cruiser-Destroyer Flotilla 7 Destroyer Squadron 36; USS Rankin (AKA-103); Escort Destroyer Division 22; USS Monaghan (DD-354)
- Conflicts: World War II
- Awards: Navy Distinguished Service Medal (3); Legion of Merit; Bronze Star Medal

Waldemar Frederick August Wendt (March 15, 1912 – October 21, 1997) was a four-star admiral in the United States Navy who served as commander in chief of United States Naval Forces Europe from 1968 to 1971.

== Early career ==
Born in Millstadt, Illinois to Reverend Paul Wendt and Wilhelmine Thowe, Wendt was appointed in 1929 from the state of Wisconsin to the United States Naval Academy, where he rowed on the Navy crew team and was captain of varsity oarsmen in his final year. Upon graduating, he was commissioned ensign on June 1, 1933.

Wendt's first assignment was aboard the battleship USS Oklahoma (BB-37). In March 1935 he transferred to the destroyer minelayer USS Ramsay (DD-124). Detached in December 1935, he returned to the Academy as assistant coach of crew until June 1936, when he reported aboard the destroyer leader USS Moffett (DD-362) until June 1939.

== World War II ==
Wendt attended the Naval Postgraduate School from June to September 1939, for instruction in applied communications, but the course was cut short when President Franklin D. Roosevelt instituted Neutrality Patrol operations, in which he was engaged as gunnery officer and first lieutenant aboard the destroyer USS Bainbridge (DD-246) in the Panama Canal Zone until June 1940. He then served six months as training officer on the staff of Commander Destroyer Squadron 27 before being transferred in December to the staff of Commander Destroyer Squadron 30 until September 1943, for duty conducting escort of convoy operations and participating in the invasion of North Africa.

In December 1943, Wendt assumed command of the destroyer USS Monaghan (DD-354) in the Pacific Fleet. He commanded Monaghan in action during the invasions of the Marshall and Marianas Islands. He was detached from Monaghan in December 1944 and assigned to the headquarters of the Commander in Chief, United States Fleet, Fleet Admiral Ernest J. King, in Washington, D.C. Less than a month later, Monaghan was lost in the 1944 typhoon, with only six survivors.

== Post-war ==
In late 1945, Wendt became head of the Pacific Section, Fleet Operations Division, Office of the Chief of Naval Operations, Navy Department. In 1947, he reported aboard the heavy cruiser USS Helena (CA-75) to serve as executive officer until July 1948, a tour that began and ended with duty in the Far East, and included a stint as Helena's commanding officer from June to September 1947 during training operations in California waters. In August he returned to the Office of the Chief of Naval Operations as administrative assistant to the assistant chief of naval operations (strategic plans).

Wendt was a student in the Strategy and Tactics course at the Naval War College from September 1949 to June 1950, then served for a year as head of the Atlantic, Europe and Middle East Section, Strategic Plans Division, Office of the Assistant Chief of Naval Operations, Navy Department. In August 1951, he joined the staff of the Commander in Chief, United States Atlantic Fleet, as General Plans Officer. From August 1953 to June 1954, he commanded Escort Destroyer Division 22; then served on the faculty of the National War College from July 1954 to August 1956, where he was chairman of the committee on the curriculum.

Wendt commanded the amphibious attack transport USS Rankin (AKA-103) from October 4, 1956, to November 9, 1957, and was advanced to Commander Destroyer Squadron 36 in December 1957. From February 1, 1959, he served as head of the Command and Policies Branch, Strategic Plans Division.

== Flag officer ==
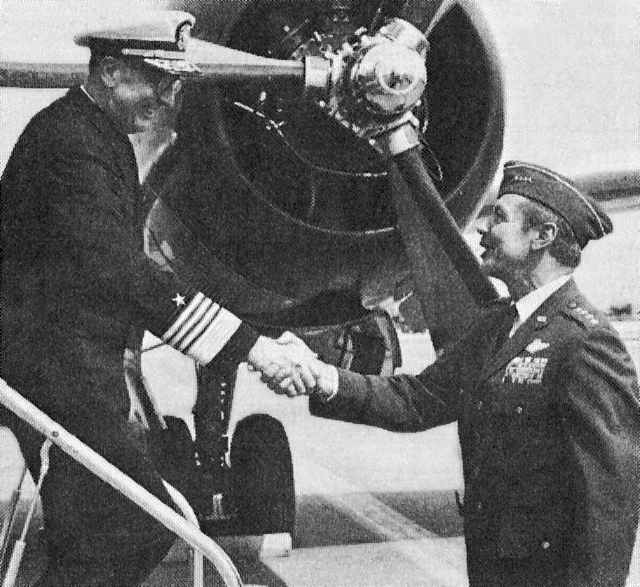
As commander in chief of United States Naval Forces Europe (left), being welcomed to United States European Command headquarters by General David A. Burchinal, 1968.

Promoted to rear admiral, Wendt assumed command on January 17, 1960, of United States Naval Forces, Marianas, with additional duty as CINCPAC representative, Marianas-Bonins, as Deputy High Commissioner of the Marianas District of the Trust Territory of the Pacific Islands, and as Deputy Military Governor of the Bonin-Volcano Islands; with headquarters in Guam. In October 1961, he became Commander Destroyer Flotilla 7 (redesignated Cruiser-Destroyer Flotilla 7 on April 1, 1962) with additional duty until November 1961 as Commander Cruiser-Destroyer Force, Pacific Fleet. From August 1962, he was assigned as director of the Strategic Plans Division, Office of the Chief of Naval Operations.

Advanced to vice admiral, Wendt was appointed deputy commander in chief, United States Atlantic Fleet and chief of staff and aide to Commander in Chief Atlantic in Norfolk, Virginia on August 9, 1965. He became deputy chief of naval operations (plans and policy) on April 17, 1967.

On May 27, 1968, President Lyndon B. Johnson nominated Wendt for promotion to admiral as commander in chief, United States Naval Forces Europe. He was confirmed by the Senate on June 6, 1968, and assumed his duties on July 12, 1968. Headquartered in London, England, Wendt was responsible for all United States naval operations in Europe, the eastern Atlantic Ocean, the Mediterranean Sea, North Africa, and the Middle East. He was relieved on June 30, 1971, and placed on the retired list with the grade of admiral on July 1, 1971.

== Personal life ==
In retirement Wendt served on the Board of Overseers of the Center for Naval Analyses from 1972 to 1983 and resided in Virginia Beach, Virginia, where he was a deacon and elder of First Presbyterian Church. He died in 1997.

Wendt married the former Folsom Ferris, of Los Angeles, California, on June 13, 1935; they had three children.

Wendt's decorations included three Navy Distinguished Service Medals, awarded upon completing tours as deputy commander in chief, United States Atlantic Command, as deputy chief of naval operations (plans and policy), and as commander in chief, United States Naval Forces Europe; the Bronze Star Medal with Combat V, awarded for commanding the destroyer Monaghan in action against enemy forces in the Pacific Area from January 1 to August 15, 1944; and the Legion of Merit, awarded for his service as director of the Strategic Plans Division.
