= James Pine =

US Coast Guard admiral (1885–1953)

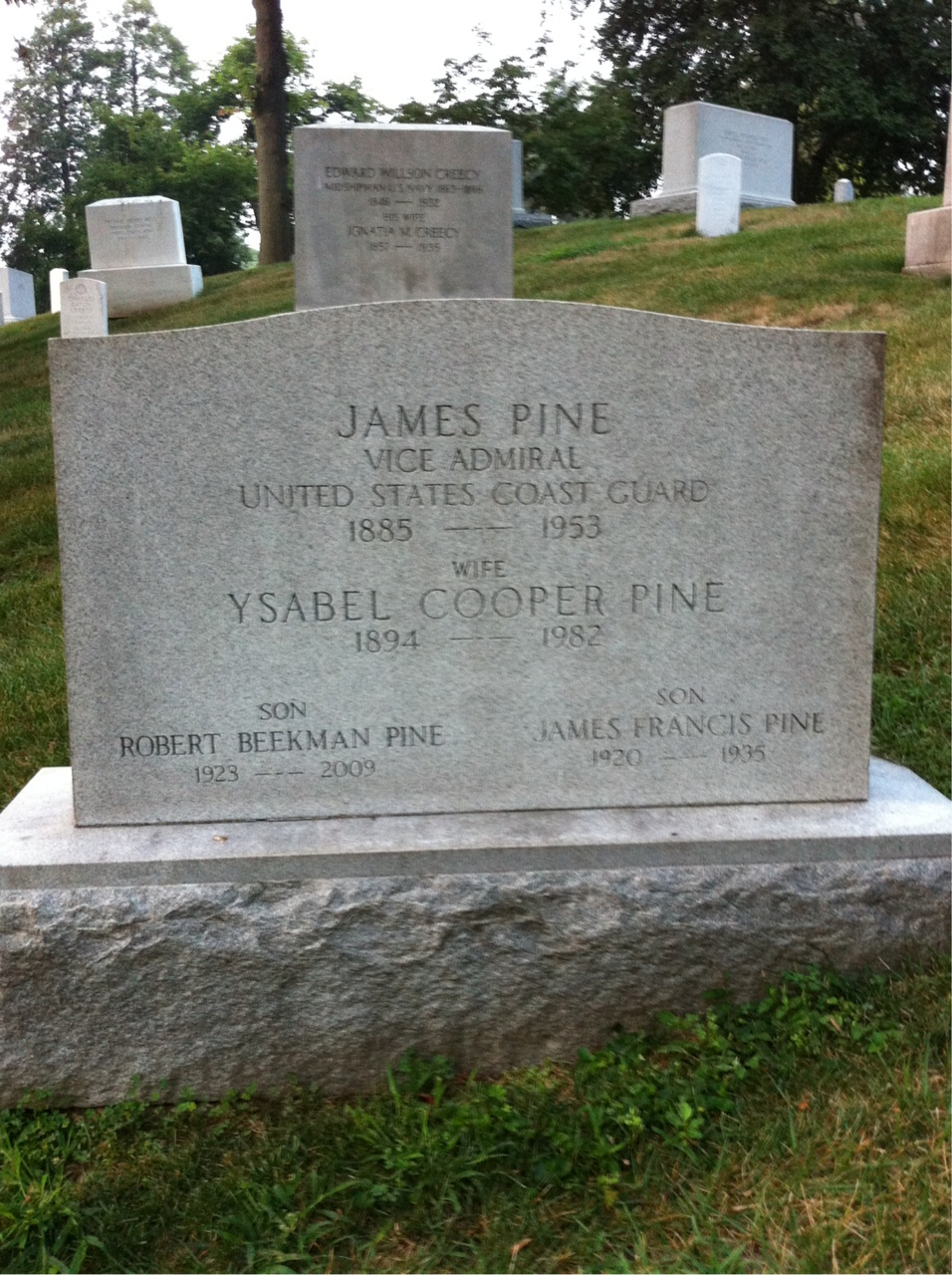
- James Pine Grave
- Born: October 19, 1885; Cincinnati, Ohio
- Died: February 21, 1953 (aged 67)
- Burial place: Arlington National Cemetery
- Spouse: Ysabel Cooper Pine
- Military career
- Allegiance: United States
- Branch: U.S. Revenue Cutter Service; U.S. Coast Guard
- Rank: Vice admiral
- Commands: USS Fanning (DD-37); USS Wainwright (DD-62); USCGC Itasca; USCGC George M. Bibb (WPG-31)
- Awards: Legion of Merit

James Pine (1885-1953) was a vice admiral in the United States Coast Guard and Superintendent of the United States Coast Guard Academy.

== Biography ==
Pine was born on October 19, 1885, in Cincinnati, Ohio. He died on February 21, 1953.

== Career ==
Pine was commissioned an ensign in the United States Revenue Cutter Service in 1908. The following year, he was stationed in Milwaukee, Wisconsin.

In 1913, Pine was assigned to the USRC Seminole. Later, he commanded the USS Fanning (DD-37), the USS Wainwright (DD-62), the USCGC Itasca and the USCGC George M. Bibb (WPG-31). In 1939, the Revenue Cutter Service merged with the United States Life-Saving Service to form the Coast Guard.

Pine became Superintendent of the Coast Guard Academy in 1940. While there, he received the Legion of Merit for his performance during World War II. He remained in the position until his retirement in 1947.

== Personal life ==
Admiral Pine was married to Ysabel Cooper Pine (1894–1982), a daughter of the Republic of Hawaii's co-founder, Judge Henry E. Cooper, and was survived by a son and two daughters. Their eldest child, artist Barbara Alice Pine Ramage (1913–2002), was married to US Navy Vice Admiral Lawson P. ("Red") Ramage, a famed submarine commander.

Pine and his wife are buried at Arlington National Cemetery along with their sons James Francis Pine (1920–1935) and Robert Beekman Pine (1923–2009).
