= USS Radford (DD-120) =

Wickes-class destroyer

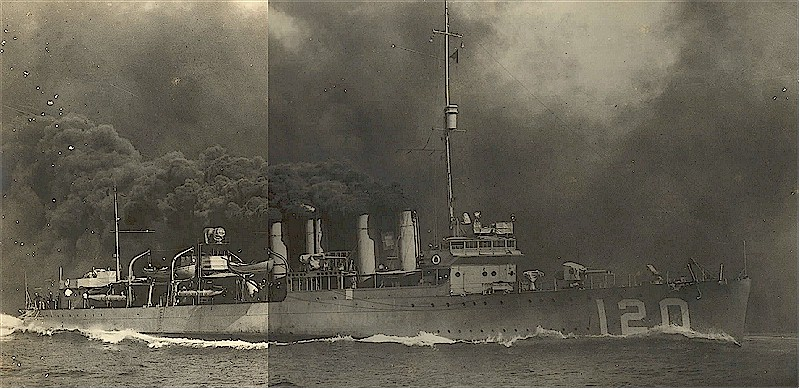
- USS Radford

History

United States
- Name: Radford
- Namesake: William Radford
- Builder: Newport News Shipbuilding & Drydock Company, Newport News, Virginia
- Laid down: 2 October 1917
- Launched: 5 April 1918
- Commissioned: 30 September 1918
- Decommissioned: 29 June 1922
- Reclassified: 16 April 1932, AG-22; 27 June 1932, DD-120
- Stricken: 19 May 1936
- Fate: Sunk as target, 5 August 1936

General characteristics
- Class & type: Wickes-class destroyer
- Displacement: 1,060 long tons (1,077 t)
- Length: 314 ft 5 in (95.8 m)
- Beam: 31 ft 8 in (9.7 m)
- Draft: 9 ft 9 3/4 in (3.0 m)
- Propulsion: 2 × steam engines; 2 × shafts
- Speed: 35 knots (40 mph; 65 km/h)
- Complement: 142 officers and enlisted
- Armament: 4 × 4 in (102 mm) guns; 2 × 3 in (76 mm) guns; 12 × 21 in (533 mm) torpedo tubes

The first USS Radford (DD–120) was a Wickes-class destroyer in the United States Navy during World War I, later reclassified AG-22. She was named for William Radford.

== History ==
Radford was launched on 5 April 1918 by Newport News Shipbuilding & Drydock Company, Newport News, Virginia, sponsored by Ms. Mary Lovell Radford. The destroyer was commissioned on 30 September 1918 at Norfolk Navy Yard, Lieutenant Commander Arthur S. Carpender in command.

Assigned to the Destroyer Force, Atlantic Fleet, Radford departed Norfolk on 12 October on a shakedown cruise to Melville, Rhode Island. She returned to Hampton Roads on 21 October to join the escort force for the Newport News section of Troop Convoy 76 bound for New York City and European waters.

Radford subsequently operated on the U.S. east coast into 1919, sailing southward to Cuba on 14 January 1919. While based at Guantanamo Bay, she also cruised to Guacanayabo Bay and Santiago, Cuba, before returning north on 13 March. Radford operated from Hampton Roads with the Atlantic Fleet from March until July 1919.

Radford was reassigned to the Pacific Fleet in July 1919 and cleared Hampton Roads on 19 July for Balboa, Canal Zone, and San Diego. Upon her arrival at San Diego on 7 August, she joined the Destroyer Force, Pacific Fleet. Radford operated from Mare Island Navy Yard, San Diego, and San Pedro into 1922, taking part in training exercises and squadron maneuvers as a unit of Division 12, Squadron 10, Destroyer Flotilla 4. She called at Seattle, Tacoma, and Bellingham, Washington in September 1919, and at Portland, Oregon, in December 1920. Designated DD-120 in July 1920, Radford decommissioned on 9 June 1922 and remained in reserve at San Diego for almost 15 years.

Radford was reclassified AG-22 on 16 April 1932 following the decision to convert her to a mobile target vessel. Conversion work was never undertaken and Radford reverted to DD-120 on 27 June. Struck from the Naval Vessel Register on 19 May 1936, Radford was sunk on 5 August 1936 in accordance with the provisions of the London Treaty for the limitation and reduction of naval armament.
