= USS Rankin =

US Navy Tolland-class attack cargo ship in service 1945–1947, 1952-1971

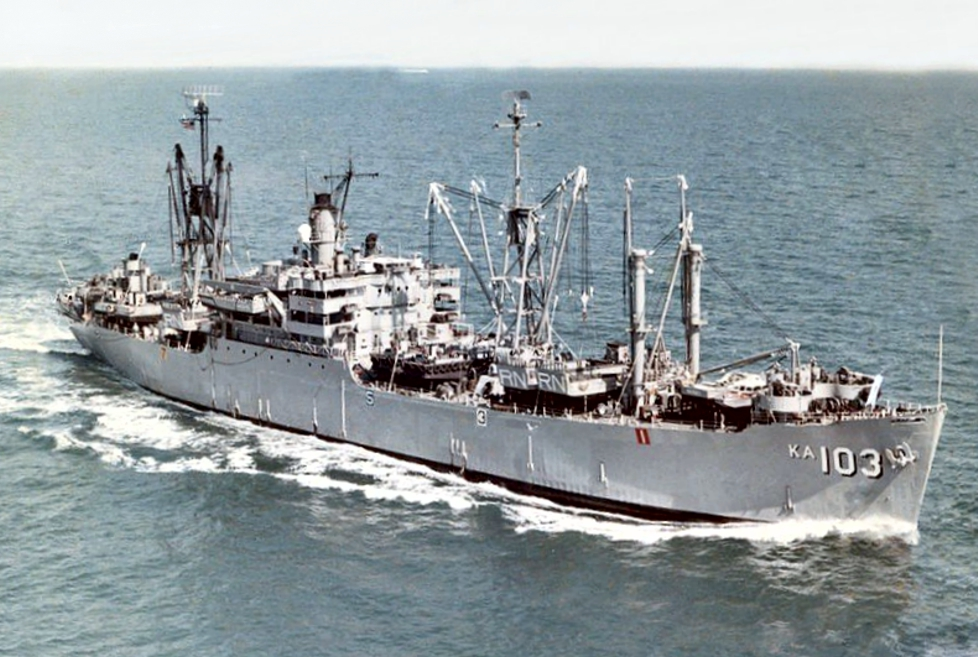
- USS Rankin (AKA-103/LKA-103)

History

United States
- Name: Rankin
- Namesake: Rankin County, Mississippi
- Ordered: July 1944
- Builder: North Carolina Shipbuilding Company, Wilmington, North Carolina
- Laid down: 31 October 1944
- Launched: 22 December 1944
- Commissioned: 25 February 1945
- Decommissioned: 21 May 1947
- Recommissioned: 22 March 1952
- Decommissioned: 11 May 1971
- Reclassified: LKA-103, 1969
- Stricken: 1 January 1977
- Motto: "Ready Now"
- Honors and awards: 1 battle star (World War II)
- Fate: Sunk as a fishing & diving reef off Stuart, Florida, 24 July 1988
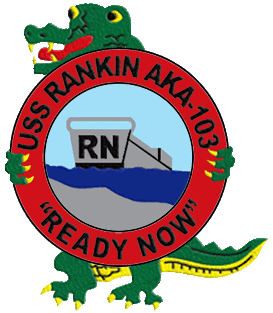
- Badge

General characteristics
- Class & type: Tolland-class attack cargo ship
- Displacement: 8,635 long tons (8,774 t) light; 13,190 long tons (13,402 t) full
- Length: 459 ft 2 in (139.95 m)
- Beam: 63 ft (19 m)
- Draft: 26 ft 4 in (8.03 m)
- Propulsion: GE geared turbine drive, single propeller, 6,000 shp (4.5 MW)
- Speed: 16.5 knots (30.6 km/h; 19.0 mph)
- Range: 17,000 miles
- Boats & landing craft carried: 14 × LCVP; 8 × LCM
- Capacity: 380,000 ft^{3} (11.000 m³), 5,275 tons
- Complement: 62 officers, 333 men
- Armament: 1 × 5"/38 caliber gun; 4 × twin 40 mm guns; 16 × 20 mm guns

USS Rankin (AKA-103/LKA-103) was a Tolland-class attack cargo ship in service with the United States Navy from 1945 to 1947 and again from 1952 to 1971. She was finally sunk as an artificial reef in 1988.

== History ==
USS Rankin was named after Rankin County, Mississippi. Her keel was laid down on 31 October 1944 at North Carolina Shipbuilding Co. in Wilmington, North Carolina. She was launched 52 days later on 22 December, and commissioned in Charleston, South Carolina on 25 February 1945.

=== World War II ===
Rankin was laid down on 31 October 1944 as Maritime Commission hull 1702 by North Carolina Shipbuilding Company, Wilmington, North Carolina. Rankin was launched on 22 December 1944, sponsored by Mrs. L. C. Freeman. The ship was acquired by the Navy on 25 January 1945, and ferried to the Charleston Navy Yard for conversion to an AKA. She was commissioned on 25 February 1945, less than four months after her keel was laid.

Following an Atlantic shakedown, Rankin steamed on 26 March 1945 in company with Tollberg (APD-103) for the Panama Canal Zone. Joining the Pacific Fleet on 1 April, she loaded Marine Corps replacement equipment at San Francisco and steamed independently for Hawaii on 17 April. Intensive training in shipboard procedures and amphibious techniques followed. She then took on 5,000 tons of Army ammunition at Honolulu and, in company with Tolovana (AO-64), steamed on 25 May for Ulithi. Escorted by Enright (DE-216), she unloaded her cargo at Okinawa. During her 17 days at the Battle of Okinawa, the ship faced more than 100 air raids by kamikaze. All ammunition was offloaded between air raids.

Rankin departed Okinawa on 28 June 1945 in convoy for Saipan. There she offloaded her boat group and then steamed independently for San Francisco, arriving on 20 July. After taking on landing craft, she put in at Seattle for repairs. Hostilities ended during loading operations, her ammunition was offloaded, and the ship sailed for the Philippines, arriving Manila on 9 September.

Assigned to TransRon 20, Rankin steamed for Lingayen Gulf. En route, she touched at Subic Bay, contributed landing craft to the boat pool there, and then commenced taking on equipment of the 25th Army Division from the San Fabian beaches.

The squadron got underway for Japan on 1 October. After riding at anchor for nearly three weeks while the approaches to Nagoya, southern Honshū, were cleared of mines, the squadron entered that port on 27 October. Rankin embarked Navy personnel there, took on inoperable landing craft at Samar in the Philippines, and sailed for home, arriving San Francisco on 25 November.

The ship visited China and Japan during 1946 and early 1947.

The ship returned home, and on 10 March 1947. Rankin was decommissioned on 21 May at San Francisco and entered the Maritime Commission's National Defense Reserve Fleet at Suisun Bay, California.

=== 1950s ===
Rankin was recommissioned on 22 March 1952 at the Todd Shipyard, Alameda, California. Following shakedown, the ship transited the Panama Canal to join the Amphibious Force, Atlantic Fleet. Operating out of Norfolk, she commenced a lengthy second career of support for amphibious training operations along the East Coast as well as in the Caribbean and Mediterranean.

Medal of Honor recipient Capt. (later V.Adm.) Lawson P. Ramage took command of the ship on 11 April 1953, serving until 19 July 1954. On 4 October 1956, Capt. (later Adm.) W.F.A. Wendt took command.

On 11 September 1957, Capt. (later R.Adm.) John Harllee relieved Capt. Wendt. On 18 July 1958, Rankin was among the amphibious forces which landed 5,000 U.S. Marines in Lebanon, in response to a request from the Lebanese Government for assistance in averting civil war.

In early March 1959 Rankin departed Norfolk for a six-month cruise to the Mediterranean as part of the United States Sixth Fleet. A cruise book was published to commemorate this trip.

=== 1960s ===
From 1959 to 1968, Rankin deployed periodically to the Caribbean with Amphibious Squadron 10, a fast amphibious squadron with Vertical Envelopment capabilities. Operating regularly in the Caribbean, she repeatedly called at Puerto Rico, the Virgin Islands, Haiti, Jamaica, and Cuba.

During the Cuban Missile Crisis of October and November 1962, occasioned by the discovery of Russian intermediate-range ballistic missiles in Cuba, Rankin operated in the force which was marshaled in Cuban waters, prepared for any eventuality. In January 1963, Rankin departed Norfolk with PHIBRON 10 and various components of the 2nd Marine Battalion. In late February, she visited Santo Domingo, Dominican Republic, in company with Boxer (LPH-4) for the inauguration of president Juan Bosch. For this service, Rankin received commendations from vice-president Lyndon B. Johnson. She returned to Norfolk on 7 March. In April, as a result of the unstable political situation in Haiti, the ship proceeded directly to a position off that country and patrolled in the Gulf of Gonave for thirty-one days until tensions eased.

Navy Cross recipient George C. Cook took command of Rankin on 16 July 1963. She subsequently had a yard period at Norfolk Naval Shipyard. Refresher training at Guantanamo Bay followed early in January 1964.

Capt. (later V.Adm.) William T. Rapp took command on 22 August 1964. Rankin participated in exercise "Steel Pike I" off the Spanish coast 28 September through 3 December. Upon returning to Norfolk, she underwent a tender availability with Amphion (AR-13), after which she resumed coastal training and readiness operations, and deployments with the Caribbean Amphibious Ready Squadron.

During squadron exercises in April 1965, Rankin participated in the Dominican Republic Intervention. Arriving off the coast of Santo Domingo, Rankin and other ships of PhibRon 10 commenced the mass embarkation and evacuation of over 1,000 refugees and U.S. civilian nationals. As a result of this operation, the Rankin and all her personnel were awarded the Navy Unit Commendation by the Secretary of the Navy.

In October 1966, Rankin was called on to render relief to the disaster area of Cayes-Jacmel, Haiti, after Hurricane Inez caused massive damage to the island. The men of Rankin unloaded tons of food, medical supplies, and building supplies to help the stricken people. After her regular overhaul period in 1967, Rankin returned to operations in the Atlantic and Caribbean with Amphibious Squadron Ten.

Deployed to the Caribbean from March to July 1968, Rankin visited San Juan, Guantanamo Bay, Panama, St. Thomas, St. Croix, Aruba and Jamaica. In August 1968, Rankin participated in exercise "Riverine 68", which was designed to demonstrate to Marine and Naval Forces the latest methods of combating jungle warfare. In November 1968, Rankin was reassigned to Amphibious Squadron Four. In December, she participated in the Apollo 8 Moon Orbital Flight as a secondary recovery ship in the U.S. Navy Recovery Force south of Bermuda.

Effective from 1 January 1969, Rankin was redesignated LKA-103 and reclassified Amphibious cargo ship. In late July, she took on Marines and equipment and deployed to the Mediterranean, returning to Norfolk on 13 December. Another cruise book was produced to commemorate this trip.

=== 1970s ===
The new year, 1970, brought with it a period of operations off the eastern seaboard, and another July-to-December Mediterranean deployment, also memorialized in a cruise book, with the Sixth Fleet. Rankin returned to Little Creek on 14 December 1970.

Rankin was decommissioned for the second and final time on 11 May 1971 at Little Creek.

=== Final disposal ===
On 24 July 1988, the ship was sunk as an artificial fishing and diving reef, six miles off the coast of Stuart, Florida. She rests on her starboard side at a depth of 130 feet at 27°12.148′N 80°06.087′W.

The following is a video showing the current state of the wreck underwater.

== Honors and awards ==
As a result of her service during World War II, Rankin was entitled to wear the ribbons associated with the American Campaign Medal, the Asiatic–Pacific Campaign Medal with one star, the World War II Victory Medal, the Navy Occupation Service Medal with an Asian Clasp, the National Defense Service Medal, and the China Service Medal.

During the eight years after her 1952 recommissioning, Rankin won the Battle Efficiency Award six times, including an unprecedented five straight from 1956 to 1960. By special order of Commander in Chief, Atlantic Fleet, Rankin sailors were authorized to wear a Gold E on their arms, and the ship wore a Gold E on her stack. In 1958, Rankin simultaneously held every award available to a ship of her class: the Battle Efficiency Award (the White E), the Engineering Red E, the communications Green E, gunnery awards for both her 40 mm batteries and her 5 inch mount, the Assault Boat Coxswain Award, and the Marjorie Sterrett Battleship Fund Award. She was awarded the Armed Forces Expeditionary Medal for her service in the Cuban Missile Crisis of 1962.
