= Force Health and Wellness Unit Award =

U.S. military award for ships and other units

The Force Health and Wellness Unit Award, commonly known as the Green "H", is awarded annually by Commander, Naval Surface Forces to the U.S. Navy ships, submarines, aviation, and other units in recognition of the unit's commitment to the health and welfare of its sailors and marines.

The criterion for the Force Health and Wellness Unit Award include medical readiness, physical readiness and health promotions programs. In order to qualify, units must maintain medical readiness standards throughout the year and demonstrate the impact that the health and fitness programs have on their sailors.

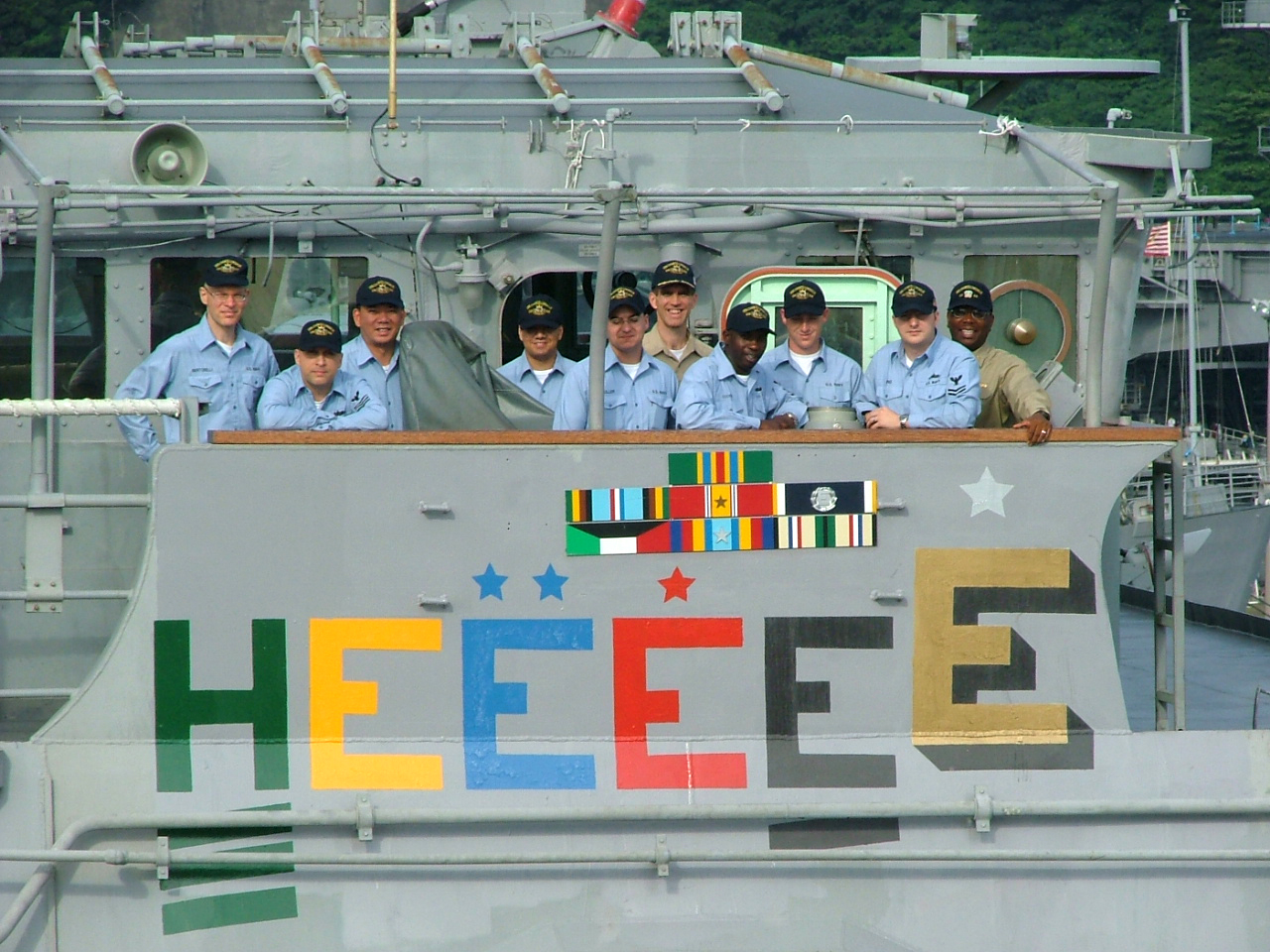
Crew members aboard the guided missile cruiser USS Chancellorsville (CG-62) assemble on the ship's bridge wing above the Green H with three hashmarks.

Ships that earn a Force Health and Wellness Unit Award are authorized to paint a green "H" on their stacks or elsewhere to display evidence of the honor. For each subsequent consecutive competition won, the ship paints an angled line, or hashmark, below the green "H". After five consecutive awards, a green star is painted above the "H". The "H" and any hashmarks or stars are removed in the year the ship first fails to win the award.

== See also ==
- Battle Effectiveness Award
- Battenberg Cup
