= USS Fanning (DD-37) =

Paulding-class destroyer

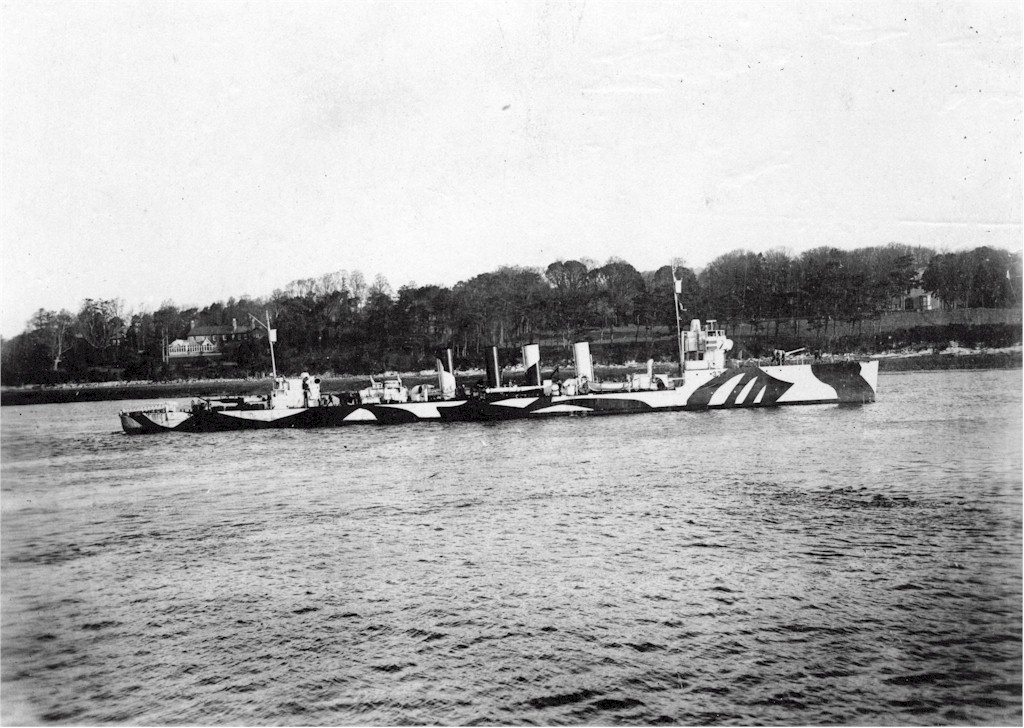
- USS Fanning (DD-37), in port, probably at Queenstown, Ireland, after her 17 November 1917 fight with the German submarine U-58. She is painted in pattern camouflage.

History

United States
- Name: Fanning
- Namesake: Lieutenant Nathaniel Fanning
- Builder: Newport News Shipbuilding Company, Newport News, Virginia
- Cost: $639,526.91
- Laid down: 29 April 1911
- Launched: 11 January 1912
- Sponsored by: Mrs. Kenneth McAlpine
- Commissioned: 21 June 1912
- Decommissioned: 24 November 1919
- Identification: Hull symbol:DD-37; Code letters:NFM
- Fate: transferred to the United States Coast Guard, 7 June 1924; sold for scrapping, 2 May 1934

United States
- Name: USCG Fanning (CG-11)
- Acquired: 7 June 1924
- Commissioned: 30 May 1925
- Decommissioned: 1 April 1930
- Identification: Hull symbol:CG-11
- Fate: transferred back to the United States Navy, 24 November 1930

General characteristics
- Class & type: Paulding-class destroyer
- Displacement: 742 long tons (754 t) normal; 887 long tons (901 t) full load
- Length: 293 ft 10 in (89.56 m)
- Beam: 27 ft (8.2 m)
- Draft: 8 ft 4 in (2.54 m) (mean)
- Installed power: 12,000 ihp (8,900 kW)
- Propulsion: 4 × boilers; 3 × Parsons Direct Drive Turbines; 3 × shafts
- Speed: 29.5 kn (33.9 mph; 54.6 km/h); 29.99 kn (34.51 mph; 55.54 km/h) (Speed on Trial)
- Complement: 4 officers 87 enlisted
- Armament: 5 × 3 in (76 mm)/50 caliber guns; 6 × 18 inch (450 mm) torpedo tubes (3 × 2)

The first USS Fanning (DD-37) was a modified Paulding-class destroyer in the United States Navy during World War I and later in the United States Coast Guard, designated as CG-11. Her namesake was Nathaniel Fanning.

Fanning was launched on 11 January 1912 by Newport News Shipbuilding Company, Newport News, Virginia; sponsored by Mrs. Kenneth McAlpine; and commissioned on 21 June 1912. She was classified DD-37 on 17 July 1920.

== Pre-World War I ==
In the years that preceded World War I, Fanning took part in the training schedule of the Atlantic Fleet, sailing to the Caribbean for winter maneuvers, and exercising off the coast of New England in the summers. Based at Norfolk, Virginia during the major portion of each year, she joined in gunnery practice in this area.

As war raged in Europe, Fanning intensified her preparations for any eventuality. When two German auxiliary cruisers visited Norfolk in September 1916, Fanning acted as part of their escort while they sailed in United States territorial waters. On 8 October, Fanning put out of Newport, Rhode Island, to search for the crews of ships sunk not far from Nantucket Light Ship by the German submarine U-58. The destroyer recovered six survivors and landed them at Newport, Rhode Island the next day. The presence of U-58 led to the speculation that a secret German submarine base might exist in the Long Island Sound—Block Island Sound area; Fanning searched from 12 to 14 October for evidence of such a base but found nothing, and returned to her regular operating schedule.

During the latter half of October 1916, Fanning and the fuel ship Jason conducted experiments to develop methods of oiling at sea, a technique which has since given the United States Navy unbounded mobility and sea-keeping qualities. Torpedo and gunnery practices, and fleet maneuvers during the next eight months sharpened Fanning's war-readiness, so that she was able to sail for distant service when called on in June 1917.

== World War I ==
Based on Queenstown, Ireland, Fanning and her sister destroyers patrolled the eastern Atlantic, escorting convoys and rescuing survivors of sunken merchantmen. At 1615 on 17 November 1917, Coxswain Daniel David Loomis sighted the periscope of U-58, and the Officer of the Deck Lieutenant Walter Owen Henry ordered the destroyer to attack. Fanning's first depth charge pattern scored, and as destroyer Nicholson joined the action, the submarine broke surface, her crew pouring out on deck, hands raised in surrender. The depth charge had hit near the submarines diving planes, forcing the submarine to surface, and also knocked out the main generator aboard Fanning. Fanning maneuvered to pick up the prisoners as the damaged submarine sank, the first of two U-boats to fall victim to US Navy destroyers in World War I. Coxswain Daniel David Loomis and Lieutenant Walter Owen Henry both received the Navy Cross for this action.

Fanning continued escort and patrol duty for the duration of the war. Though she made numerous submarine contacts, all of her attacks were inconclusive. On many occasions, she went to the aid of torpedoed ships, rescuing survivors and carrying them into port. On 8 October 1918, she picked up a total of 103 survivors, 25 from a merchantman and 78 from the Dupetit-Thouars.

Fanning passed in review before President Woodrow Wilson on board the transport George Washington in Brest Harbor on 13 December, then remained at Brest until March of the following year. After a quick voyage to Plymouth, England, Fanning departed Brest for the States, by way of Lisbon, Portugal, and Ponta Delgada, Azores, in company with several other destroyers, and escorting a large group of submarine chasers. Fanning was placed out of commission at Philadelphia on 24 November 1919.

== Inter-war period ==
On 7 June 1924, Fanning was transferred to the Coast Guard with whom she served until 24 November 1930. She was sold for scrap on 2 May 1934.

== Notable crew ==
Robert Carney served aboard Fanning as gunnery and torpedo officer, and contributed to the sinking of German submarine U-58. On 29 July 1943, he was promoted to Rear Admiral and became Chief of Staff to Admiral William Halsey, Jr., commander, South Pacific Force, which included all ground, sea, and air forces in the South Pacific area. Carney later wrote that "Admiral Halsey unfailingly gave credit to his subordinates for successes achieved, and took all blame for failures on his own shoulders."

During World War I, Fanning was commanded by Lieutenant Arthur S. Carpender, later Vice Admiral in charge of the entire Atlantic Destroyer fleet during World War II.

From 1925 to 1926, Fanning was commanded by Lieutenant Commander James Pine, later Vice Admiral and Superintendent of the United States Coast Guard Academy.
