= Lawson P. Ramage =

US Navy admiral and Medal of Honor recipient

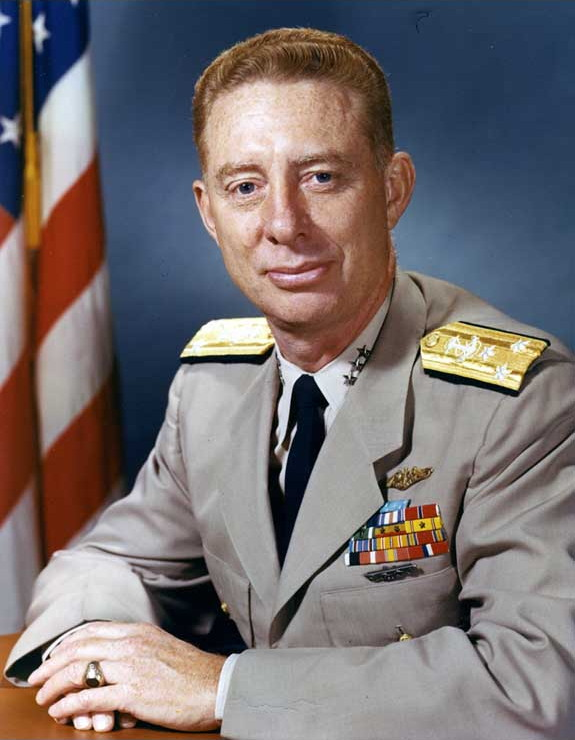
- Born: 19 January 1909; Monroe, Massachusetts, U.S.
- Died: 15 April 1990 (aged 81); Bethesda, Maryland, U.S.
- Burial place: Arlington National Cemetery
- Spouse: Barbara Alice Pine
- Military career
- Allegiance: United States
- Branch: United States Navy
- Service years: 1931–1969
- Rank: Vice admiral
- Nickname: "Red"
- Commands: Military Sea Transportation Service; United States First Fleet; Cruiser Squadron Two; USS Rankin (AKA-103); Submarine Squadron Six; Submarine Division Two; USS Parche (SS-384); USS Trout (SS-202)
- Conflicts: World War II
- Awards: Medal of Honor; Navy Cross (2); Navy Distinguished Service Medal; Silver Star; Bronze Star Medal; Navy Commendation Medal

Lawson Paterson "Red" Ramage (19 January 1909 – 15 April 1990) was a vice admiral in the United States Navy and a noted submarine commander during World War II. Ramage was decorated with the Medal of Honor and several other combat decorations during the war. He also served during the Korean War and the Vietnam War.

== Early life and career ==
Taking his nickname from his hair color, Ramage was born on 19 January 1909, in Monroe, Massachusetts.

He graduated from the U.S. Naval Academy in 1931, having injured his right eye while wrestling, and was subsequently commissioned as an ensign in the U.S. Navy. From 1931 to 1935, he served aboard several surface ships. He was the navigator of the destroyer USS Dickerson, the engineering officer of the destroyer USS Lawrence, and the radio officer of the heavy cruiser USS Louisville. Ramage was unable to pass the submarine physical examination because of his eye injury, and is quoted by Stephen Moore as having said, "I took the opportunity to memorize the eye chart so that when I returned I had no problem reading off the eye chart" and getting his approval. Confronted with a subsequent eye examination, Ramage related that he passed the eye examination "by just exchanging the card before my right eye and reading with my left eye in both instances." In January 1936, Lieutenant (jg) Ramage reported to the submarine USS S-29; he subsequently spent most of his career on submarines.

In 1938, Ramage returned to the Naval Academy for postgraduate education. In September 1939, Ramage became executive officer of the destroyer USS Sands, serving until February, 1941. Subsequent duty took him to Hawaii as the force communications and sound officer on the staff of commander, Submarines Pacific Fleet (ComSubPac).

== World War II ==
=== Early service ===
Ramage was highly decorated for heroism during World War II, receiving the Medal of Honor, two Navy Crosses, and the Silver Star. Ramage was stationed at Pearl Harbor on the staff of the commander, Submarines, Pacific during the surprise Japanese attack on 7 December 1941.

In early 1942, he served on his first patrol of the war as the navigator of the submarine USS Grenadier. He was awarded the Silver Star as a member of the Grenadier's crew for "conspicuous gallantry and intrepidity" while patrolling enemy waters. The citation reads:

For conspicuous gallantry and intrepidity in action against the enemy while serving as Navigator aboard the Submarine U.S.S. GRENADIER (SS-210) during a War Patrol of that Vessel in enemy-controlled waters from 12 April to 10 June 1942. Exhibiting outstanding skill and efficiency in the performance of his duties, Commander Ramage rendered valuable assistance to his Commanding Officer during attacks which resulted in the sinking of two enemy ships totaling 24,000 tons and, in addition, contributed materially to the success of his vessel in evading enemy countermeasures. His leadership, courage and devotion to duty were an inspiration to the officers and men and were in keeping with the highest traditions of the United States Naval Service.

=== USS Trout ===
In June 1942, Lieutenant Commander Ramage assumed his first command, the submarine USS Trout. Under his command, Trout conducted four war patrols and sank three Japanese ships. He was awarded the Navy Cross for extraordinary heroism while in command of Trout at Midway, Truk, the Solomons, and the South China Sea. During his first patrol, Trout's fifth, on 28 August 1942, he made the first attack that actually scored a hit on a Japanese aircraft carrier, Taiyō. Ramage found a virtue in his eye injury:

I didn't have to fool around with the focus knob on the periscope. Before I raised it, I turned the knob all the way to the stop [extreme focus]. When the scope came up, I put my bad eye to the periscope and could see perfectly.

Promoted to commander before his second patrol, Ramage and Trout intercepted the Imperial Japanese Navy battleship Kirishima on 12 November 1942. Though he fired five torpedoes, all missed.

On his third patrol, Trout damaged Kyokuyo Maru and Nisshin Maru, and sank Hirotama Maru. The Hirotama Maru battle was both a torpedo and deck gun engagement. Of the fourteen torpedoes Ramage fired, five were duds. He joined other submarine commanders in his criticism of the Mark 14 torpedo.

Ramage's last Trout patrol, her eighth, in March 1943 was a washout: 15 torpedoes fired, with only one low-order detonation. It was Admiral Ralph W. Christie's view that, "Red had a miss last patrol—many chances and many failures. He is due for a relief and will be sent back to the U.S. for a new boat and rest at the same time.". (Note: Christie's assessment must be viewed in light of the fact that he was the officer most responsible for pre-war development of the infamous Mark VI magnetic exploder.) He was awarded the Navy Cross as a commanding officer of Trout. The citation reads:

For extraordinary heroism in the line of his profession as Commanding Officer of the U.S.S. TROUT (SS-202), on the FIFTH, SIXTH and SEVENTH War Patrols of that submarine during the period 27 August 1942 to 25 February 1943, in enemy controlled waters of the Pacific War Area. During this period of intense activity, Lieutenant Commander Ramage distinguished himself by his brilliant tactical knowledge and sound judgment in maneuvering his vessel into advantageous striking position so skillfully and aggressively as to destroy and damage an important amount of enemy shipping. Through his excellent direction of these hazardous operations he enabled the TROUT to complete her vital missions successfully. Lieutenant Commander Ramage's inspiring leadership and the valiant devotion to duty of his command contributed immeasurably to the efforts of our forces against a determined and desperate enemy and reflect great credit upon himself and the United States Naval Service.

=== USS Parche ===
In May 1943, Ramage assumed command of the new Balao-class submarine USS Parche. Commissioned in November 1943 at Portsmouth Naval Shipyard in Kittery, Maine, Parche sailed to Pearl Harbor, Hawaii. Parche's first patrol, in March 1944, was as part of a U.S. submarine wolfpack with USS Bang and USS Tinosa. The wolfpack sank seven enemy ships for 35,000 tons; Ramage was credited with two of them for 11,700 tons.

In June 1944, Parche's second patrol was also as part of a wolfpack. This was the patrol that established Ramage's reputation. On 30 July 1944, the wolfpack made contact with an enemy convoy. In the dark hours before dawn on 31 July, for 48 minutes ("among the wildest of the submarine war")

Ramage cleared the bridge of all personnel except himself and steamed right into the enemy convoy on the surface, maneuvering among the ships and firing nineteen torpedoes. Japanese ships fired back with deck guns and tried to ram his submarine. With consummate seamanship and coolness under fire, Ramage dodged and twisted, returning torpedo fire for gunfire.... the attack on the Japanese convoy by Red Ramage was the talk of the U.S. submarine force. In terms of close-in, furious torpedo shooting, there had never been anything like it before.

While the description from Clay Blair describes Ramage as being alone, by his own account Ramage retained a quartermaster on the bridge to keep a lookout aft.

Parche sank two enemy ships and badly damaged three others. For this action, Commander Ramage became the first living submariner Medal of Honor recipient since Henry Breault. It was formally presented to him by President Franklin D. Roosevelt on 10 January 1945.

Parche's third patrol, and Ramage's last, was comparatively uneventful, with no enemy ships sunk. He was also awarded a second Navy Cross. The citation reads:

For extraordinary heroism in the line of his profession as Commanding Officer of the U.S.S. PARCHE (SS-384), on the FIRST War Patrol of that submarine during the period 29 March 1944 to 23 May 1944, in enemy controlled waters of the Luzon Strait in the Philippine Islands. Despite strong enemy escorts which included air support, Commander Ramage skillfully penetrated the escort screens and through his daring and aggressive determination, delivered smashing torpedo attacks against enemy ships. As a result of these well planned and brilliantly executed attacks, he successfully sank four enemy ships totaling over 30,000 tons. In spite of strong enemy counterattacks and active air opposition, his skillful evasive tactics enabled him to escape and bring his ship to port. His conduct throughout was an inspiration to his officers and men and in keeping with the highest traditions of the United States Naval Service.

==== Medal of Honor citation ====
For conspicuous gallantry and intrepidity at the risk of his life above and beyond the call of duty as commanding officer of the U.S.S. Parche in a predawn attack on a Japanese convoy, 31 July 1944. Boldly penetrating the screen of a heavily escorted convoy, Comdr. Ramage launched a perilous surface attack by delivering a crippling stern shot into a freighter and quickly following up with a series of bow and stern torpedoes to sink the leading tanker and damage the second one. Exposed by the light of bursting flares and bravely defiant of terrific shellfire passing close overhead, he struck again, sinking a transport by two forward reloads. In the mounting fury of fire from the damaged and sinking tanker, he calmly ordered his men below, remaining on the bridge to fight it out with an enemy now disorganized and confused. Swift to act as a fast transport closed in to ram, Comdr. Ramage daringly swung the stern of the speeding Parche as she crossed the bow of the onrushing ship, clearing by less than 50 feet but placing his submarine in a deadly crossfire from escorts on all sides and with the transport dead ahead. Undaunted, he sent 3 smashing "down the throat" bow shots to stop the target, then scored a killing hit as a climax to 46 minutes of violent action with the Parche and her valiant fighting company retiring victorious and unscathed.

Following the presentation, Commander Ramage created a certificate for each sailor in his command. The certificate read:

The captain wishes to emphasize the fact that the Medal of Honor was accepted from the president of the United States as the Nation's tribute to a fighting ship and her courageous crew. He feels that every officer and man whose loyal cooperation and able assistance contributed to the success of the USS Parche has an equal share in this award which he holds in trust for you. With great pride and respect. Sincerely, L. P. Ramage

Parche was awarded a Presidential Unit Citation.

=== Summary ===
Summary of CDR Lawson P. Ramage's USS Trout and USS Parche war patrols
	Departing from	Date	Days	Wartime credit ships/tonnage	JANAC credit ships/tonnage	Patrol area
Trout-5	Pearl Harbor, TH	August 1942	47	1/8,200	1/863	→ Brisbane; Via Truk
Trout-6	Brisbane, Australia	October 1942	28	zero/zero	zero/zero	Solomons
Trout-7	Fremantle, Australia	December 1942	58	2/10,800	2/4,895	Indochina
Trout-8	Fremantle, Australia	March 1943	42	zero/zero	zero/zero	South China Sea; Laid minefields
Parche-1	Pearl Harbor, TH	March 1944	56	3/23,900	2/11,719	Luzon Strait
Parche-2	Pearl Harbor, TH	June 1944	59	4/34,300	2.5/19,204	Luzon Strait; Shared 1/2 credit with Steelhead
Parche-3	Pearl Harbor, TH	September 1944	77	zero/zero	zero/zero	Luzon Strait

CDR Ramage's ranking compared to other top skippers
Ranking	Number of patrols	Ships/tons credited	Ships/tons JANAC
50	7	10/77,200	7.5/36,681

== Post-war navy career ==
After the war, he continued to serve in command of submarines, being commander of Submarine Division Two and then commander of Submarine Squadron Six. From 1953–1954, he was commanding officer of the amphibious cargo ship USS Rankin. Following ascent to flag rank in July 1956, Admiral Ramage was on the staff of the chief of naval operations, and then commander of Cruiser Division Two. In 1963, serving as deputy commander of Submarine Forces, Atlantic Fleet, Admiral Ramage led the search operations for the nuclear submarine USS Thresher that sank in the Atlantic Ocean near Boston, Massachusetts. That same year he was promoted to vice admiral, and became Deputy Chief of Naval Operations for fleet operations and readiness. Vice Admiral Ramage was commander, First Fleet, from 1964 to 1966 during the buildup to the Vietnam War. In 1967, he became commander, Military Sea Transportation Service. He retired from the Navy in 1969. He received the Navy Distinguished Service Medal. The citation reads:

The president of the United States of America takes pleasure in presenting the Navy Distinguished Service Medal to Vice Admiral Lawson Paterson "Red" Ramage, United States Navy, for exceptionally meritorious and distinguished service in a position of great responsibility to the Government of the United States as Commander FIRST Fleet, from July 1964 to July 1966. During this period of ever-increasing tension in Southeast Asia, Vice Admiral Ramage exercised outstanding leadership, sound judgment and keen foresight in increasing the readiness posture of forces assigned to the FIRST Fleet, ensuring that units deploying to Southeast Asia were ready for any contingency. This he accomplished by conducting training and fleet exercised under conditions closely simulating those that would be encountered in Southeast Asia. Lessons learned in the combat environment of Southeast Asia were widely disseminated and, from these lessons, new tactics were developed and incorporated in fleet exercises, and requirements for improved and new equipment were brought forth. Through his professional knowledge and dedicated and tireless devotion to duty, Vice Admiral Ramage has made an outstanding contribution to the efforts of the Pacific Fleet in accomplishing its vital mission. His distinguished achievements reflect great credit upon himself and the United States Naval Service.

== Personal life ==
On 2 November 1935, Ramage married Barbara Alice Pine, the daughter of U.S. Coast Guard Vice Admiral James Pine. They had two sons and two daughters.

Ramage died of cancer in his home at Bethesda, Maryland, in 1990. He and his wife Barbara Alice (1913–2002) are buried in Arlington National Cemetery.

== Awards and decorations ==
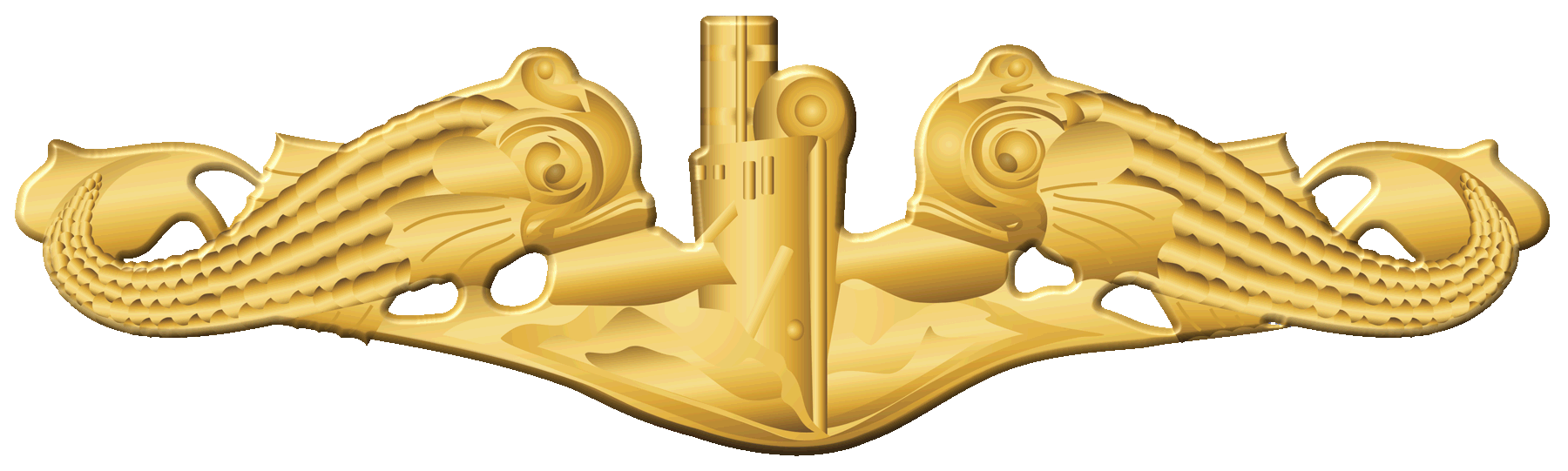

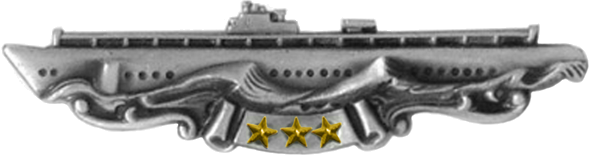

Badge	Submarine Warfare Insignia		
1st row	Medal of Honor	Navy Cross with 5/16 inch star	Navy Distinguished Service Medal with 5/16 inch star
2nd row	Silver Star	Bronze Star Medal	Navy Commendation Medal with "V" Device and 5/16 inch star
3rd row	Combat Action Ribbon Retroactively Awarded, 1999	Navy Presidential Unit Citation with 2 Service stars	American Defense Service Medal with A Device
4th row	American Campaign Medal	Asiatic-Pacific Campaign Medal with 7 Campaign stars	World War II Victory Medal
5th row	Navy Occupation Service Medal with 'Asia' Clasp	National Defense Service Medal with 1 Service star	Philippine Liberation Medal with 1 Campaign star
Badge	Submarine Combat Patrol Insignia		

== Posthumous honors ==
The guided missile destroyer USS Ramage was named for him in 1994. Several submarine-related facilities were also named after him including the administrative building (Ramage Hall) of the Submarine Training Facility in Norfolk, Virginia, and the headquarters building at Naval Submarine Base New London on 20 August 2010.

== See also ==
- List of Medal of Honor recipients
