= USS Macdonough (DD-331) =

Clemson-class destroyer

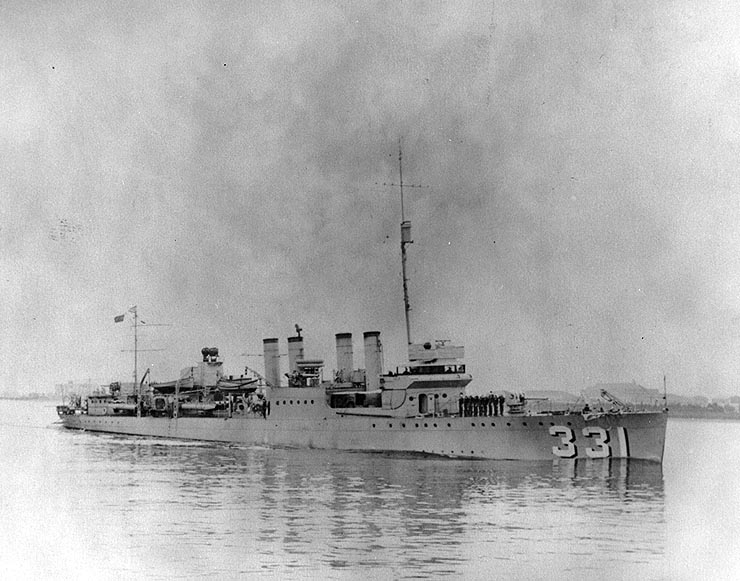
- USS Macdonough

History

United States
- Namesake: Thomas Macdonough
- Builder: Bethlehem Shipbuilding Corporation, Union Iron Works, San Francisco
- Laid down: 24 May 1920
- Launched: 15 December 1920
- Commissioned: 30 April 1921
- Decommissioned: 8 January 1930
- Stricken: 8 July 1930
- Fate: Sold for scrap, 20 December 1930

General characteristics
- Class & type: Clemson-class destroyer
- Displacement: 1,290 long tons (1,311 t) (standard); 1,389 long tons (1,411 t) (deep load)
- Length: 314 ft 4 in (95.8 m)
- Beam: 30 ft 11 in (9.42 m)
- Draught: 10 ft 3 in (3.1 m)
- Installed power: 27,000 shp (20,000 kW); 4 water-tube boilers
- Propulsion: 2 shafts, 2 steam turbines
- Speed: 35 knots (65 km/h; 40 mph) (design)
- Range: 2,500 nautical miles (4,600 km; 2,900 mi) at 20 knots (37 km/h; 23 mph) (design)
- Complement: 6 officers, 108 enlisted men
- Armament: 4 × single 4-inch (102 mm) guns; 2 × single 1-pounder AA guns or; 2 × single 3-inch (76 mm) guns; 4 × triple 21 inch (533 mm) torpedo tubes; 2 × depth charge rails

USS Macdonough (DD-331) was a Clemson-class destroyer built for the United States Navy during World War I.

== Description ==
The Clemson class was a repeat of the preceding Wickes class although more fuel capacity was added. The ships displaced 1,290 long tons (1,311 t) at standard load and 1,389 long tons (1,411 t) at deep load. They had an overall length of 314 feet 4 inches (95.8 m), a beam of 30 feet 11 inches (9.4 m) and a draught of 10 feet 3 inches (3.1 m). They had a crew of 6 officers and 108 enlisted men.

Performance differed radically between the ships of the class, often due to poor workmanship. The Clemson class was powered by two steam turbines, each driving one propeller shaft, using steam provided by four water-tube boilers. The turbines were designed to produce a total of 27,000 shaft horsepower (20,000 kW) intended to reach a speed of 35 knots (65 km/h; 40 mph). The ships carried a maximum of 371 long tons (377 t) of fuel oil which was intended gave them a range of 2,500 nautical miles (4,600 km; 2,900 mi) at 20 knots (37 km/h; 23 mph).

The ships were armed with four 4-inch (102 mm) guns in single mounts and were fitted with two 1-pounder guns for anti-aircraft defense. In many ships a shortage of 1-pounders caused them to be replaced by 3-inch (76 mm) guns. Their primary weapon, though, was their torpedo battery of a dozen 21 inch (533 mm) torpedo tubes in four triple mounts. They also carried a pair of depth charge rails. A "Y-gun" depth charge thrower was added to many ships.

== Construction and career ==
Macdonough, named for Thomas Macdonough, was laid down 24 May 1920 by the Bethlehem Shipbuilding Corporation, San Francisco, California; launched 15 December 1920; sponsored by Mrs. Charles W. Dabney, great-granddaughter of Commodore Thomas Macdonough; and commissioned 30 April 1921. Based at San Diego, California throughout her naval service, Macdonough operated primarily along the west coast. Periodic maneuvers and cruises with the Battle Fleet off the Pacific coast of Central America, the Hawaiian Islands, and in the Caribbean, as well as special assignments, intervened in her normal operations schedule. Included in her special assignments was a good will cruise with the fleet to Samoa, Australia, and New Zealand, 20 June to 26 September 1925.

On 22 March 1929, Macdonough returned to San Diego from fleet exercises held off Balboa, Panama Canal Zone, and operated off southern California until decommissioning at San Diego 8 January 1930. She was sold as scrap 20 December 1930.
