= USS Tollberg =

WWII United States Navy transport vessel

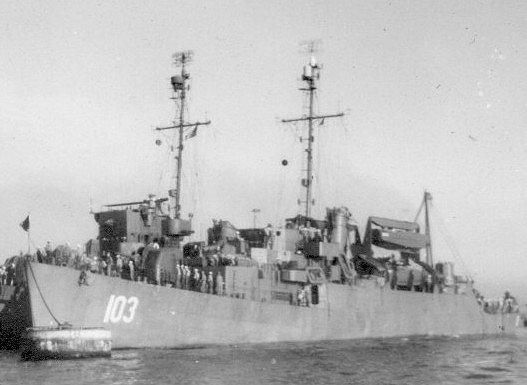
- USS Tollberg in December 1945

History

United States
- Name: USS Tollberg (DE-593)
- Namesake: Maynard W. Tollberg
- Builder: Bethlehem-Hingham Shipyard, Inc., Hingham, Massachusetts
- Laid down: 30 December 1943 as Rudderow-class destroyer escort
- Launched: 12 February 1944
- Sponsored by: Mrs. Maynard W. Tollberg
- Reclassified: APD-103, 17 July 1944
- Commissioned: 31 January 1945
- Decommissioned: 20 December 1946
- Stricken: November 1964
- Honors and awards: One battle star for World War II service
- Fate: Transferred to Colombia, 14 August 1965

Colombia
- Name: ARC Almirante Padilla
- Acquired: 14 August 1965
- Stricken: 1973
- Identification: Pennant number: DT-03
- Fate: Scrapped, 1973

General characteristics
- Class & type: Crosley-class high speed transport
- Displacement: 2,130 long tons (2,164 t) full
- Length: 306 ft (93 m)
- Beam: 37 ft (11 m)
- Draft: 12 ft 7 in (3.84 m)
- Speed: 23 knots (43 km/h; 26 mph)
- Troops: 162
- Complement: 204
- Armament: 1 × 5 in (130 mm) gun; 6 × 40 mm guns; 6 × 20 mm guns; 2 × depth charge tracks

USS Tollberg (APD-103) was a United States Navy high-speed transport in commission from 1945 to 1946. In 1965, Tollberg was transferred to Colombia and served as ARC Almirante Padilla (DT-03) until being stricken and scrapped in 1973.

== Namesake ==
Maynard W. Tollberg was born on 17 February 1904 born at North Branch, Minnesota. He enlisted in the United States Naval Reserve on 24 September 1923, and was honorably discharged on 15 September 1927. After the beginning of World War II, he reenlisted on 23 June 1942 with the same rating. He was assigned duty on board the destroyer USS La Vallette.

On the afternoon of 30 January 1943, during the second day of the Battle of Rennell Island, La Vallette was screening the damaged heavy cruiser USS Chicago when 11 Japanese torpedo planes attacked. La Vallette received a torpedo hit in her forward engine room which killed 22 members of the crew. Watertender Second Class Tollberg, although fatally scalded by high-temperature steam, climbed up the fire room ladder and emerged on the main deck through a hatch which had been blown open by the detonation. Despite severe pain and partial blindness, he died trying to close the control valve through which fuel oil was pouring into the fireroom below, where a number of his helpless shipmates were trapped. He then collapsed and soon died of his wounds. He was posthumously awarded the Navy Cross.

== History ==
=== Construction and commissioning ===
Tollberg was laid down as the Rudderow-class destroyer escort USS Tollberg (DE-593) on 30 December 1943 by Bethlehem-Hingham Shipyard, Inc., at Hingham, Massachusetts, and was launched on 12 February 1944, sponsored by Mrs. Maynard W. Tollberg. The ship was reclassified as a Crosley-class high-speed transport and redesignated APD-103 on 17 July 1944. After conversion to her new role, she was commissioned on 31 January 1945.

=== Pacific War ===
Tollberg stood out of Boston, Massachusetts, on 18 February 1945 for shakedown training off Bermuda. She left Bermuda on 9 March and arrived at Hampton Roads, Virginia, on 11 March.

On 25 March, Tollberg got underway to escort attack cargo ship Rankin to the Panama Canal Zone. Tollberg transited the Panama Canal on 31 March and on 1 April proceeded independently to California. She reached San Diego, California, on 9 April and, on 15 April, departed for Hawaii.

Tollberg arrived at Pearl Harbor, Territory of Hawaii, on 22 April, but left again on 4 May and proceeded via Eniwetok to Ulithi Atoll. She got underway on 31 May with destroyer escort Cross to escort the landing craft repair ships Poseidon and Minotaur and tanker Moose to Okinawa, where the Okinawa campaign was in progress. She arrived at the Hagushi beach area on 4 June and was assigned to picket duty in the antiaircraft and antisubmarine screen. Tollberg had only one opportunity to fire her guns at the enemy, at a distant Japanese aircraft.

On 8 August, Tollberg and destroyer escort Abercrombie joined battleships California and Nevada to screen them on a voyage to the Philippine Islands. On 9 August, Tollberg rescued a pilot from California whose float plane had swamped while taxiing in to be picked up. The warships arrived at Leyte in the Philippines on 11 August, and Tollberg remained there until 20 August. World War II ended during her stay at Leyte with the surrender of Japan on 15 August.

=== Postwar ===
Tollberg departed the Philippines on 20 August to escort a convoy to Okinawa and returned to Leyte on 29 August. Between 20 September and 3 October, she escorted Transport Squadron 14 to Wakayama Bay, Japan, and back to Leyte. On 2 November, she left Manila, Luzon, to carry passengers to Okinawa and, after escorting amphibious force command ship Estes to Shanghai, China, disembarked them at Buckner Bay, Okinawa, on 7 November. On 12 November, she was back at Manila. Between 24 and 26 November, she embarked 156 passengers at Samar in the Philippines for passage to the United States East Coast.

Departing Samar on 27 November, Tollberg called at Eniwetok, Pearl Harbor, San Diego, and the Panama Canal Zone before arriving at Norfolk, Virginia, on 30 December. She remained at Norfolk until 26 March 1946, when she headed for the West Indies. After two months in the Caribbean, she was at the New York Naval Shipyard in Brooklyn, New York, from 20 May to 24 July. She then entered the Charleston Naval Shipyard at Charleston, South Carolina, for preservation work which continued from 26 July to 12 November. Tollberg then moved on to Green Cove Springs, Florida, arriving there on 13 November.

=== Decommissioning and disposal ===
Tollberg was decommissioned at Green Cove Springs on 20 December 1946 and entered the Atlantic Reserve Fleet on the St. Johns River there. In September 1959, she was towed from Mayport, Florida, to Sabine Pass, Texas, and laid up with the Texas Reserve Group of the Atlantic Reserve Fleet.

Tollberg was stricken from the Navy List in November 1964

=== Colombian Navy service ===
Tollberg was transferred to Colombia under the Military Assistance Program on 14 August 1965. She served in the Colombian Navy as ARC Almirante Padilla (DT-03) until stricken and scrapped in 1973.

== Honors and awards ==
Tollberg received one battle star for her World War II service.
