= List of Balao-class submarines =

One hundred twenty Balao-class submarines were built during and after World War II, commissioned from February 1943 through September 1948, with 12 commissioned postwar. This was the most numerous US submarine class. Nine of the 52 US submarines lost in World War II were of this class, along with five lost postwar, including one in Turkish service in 1953, one in Argentine service in the Falklands War of 1982, and one in Peruvian service in 1988. Also, Lancetfish flooded and sank while fitting out at the Boston Naval Shipyard on 15 March 1945. She was raised but not repaired, and was listed with the reserve fleet postwar until struck in 1958. Some of the class served actively in the US Navy through the middle 1970s, and one (Hai Pao ex-Tusk) is still active in Taiwan's Republic of China Navy.The primary improvement of the Balao class over the preceding Gato class was an increase in test depth from 300 feet (91 m) to 400 feet (120 m), which was shared with the subsequent Tench class. This, combined with generally less wartime service than previous classes, led to the Balao and Tench classes being preferred for modernization programs and active postwar service. 36 Balaos were modernized under various GUPPY conversion programs, plus 19 received the more austere "Fleet Snorkel" modernization, often in connection with foreign transfers.

SS-361 through SS-364 were initially ordered as Balao-class, and were assigned hull numbers that fall in the middle of the range of numbers for the Balao class (SS-285 through SS-416 & SS-425–426). Thus, in some references they are listed with this class. However, they were completed by Manitowoc as Gatos, due to an unavoidable delay in Electric Boat's development of Balao-class drawings. Manitowoc was a follow yard to Electric Boat, and was dependent on them for designs and drawings.

== Cancellations ==
A total of 125 U.S. submarines were cancelled during World War II, all but three between 29 July 1944 and 12 August 1945. The exceptions were USS Wahoo (SS-516), USS Unicorn (SS-436), and USS Walrus (SS-437), cancelled 7 January 1946. References vary considerably as to how many of these were Balaos and how many were Tenches. Some references simply assume all submarines numbered after SS-416 were Tench class; however, USS Trumpetfish (SS-425) and USS Tusk (SS-426) were completed as Balaos. This yields 10 cancelled Balao-class, SS-353-360 and 379-380. The Register of Ships of the U. S. Navy differs, considering every submarine not specifically ordered as a Tench to be a Balao, and further projecting SS-551-562 as a future class. This yields 62 cancelled Balao class, 51 cancelled Tench class, and 12 cancelled SS-551 class. This article follows the information in the "Register". Two of the cancelled Balao-class submarines, Turbot and Ulua, were launched incomplete and served for years as experimental hulks at Annapolis and Norfolk, Virginia. Two of the cancelled Tench-class boats, Unicorn and Walrus, were also launched incomplete, never commissioned, but listed with the Reserve fleet until struck in 1958 and scrapped in 1959. The cancelled hull numbers, including those launched incomplete, were SS-353-360 (Balao), 379–380 (Balao), 427–434 (Balao), 436–437 (Tench), 438–474 (Balao), 491–521 (Tench), 526-529 (Tench), 530–536 (Balao), 537-550 (Tench), and 551-562 (SS-551 class).

== Abbreviations ==
Abbreviations and hull classification symbols for postwar redesignations/conversions:

- AGSS — auxiliary submarine (various roles including sonar testing and some pierside trainers)
- FS — "fleet snorkel" conversion, including a snorkel and streamlined sail
- G IA, G II, etc. — various GUPPY conversions, usually including a snorkel, streamlined sail, improved batteries, and upgraded sonar and electronics
- IXSS — unclassified submarine
- PT — pierside trainer for naval reservists, reportedly immobilized by removing the propellers
- SSA/ASSA - cargo submarine
- SSG — guided missile submarine
- SSP/ASSP/APSS/LPSS — amphibious transport submarine
- SSR — radar picket submarine
- Struck — Struck (deleted) from the Naval Vessel Register, usually followed by scrapping or other final disposal, or sale to a foreign navy

== Ships in class ==
Construction data
Ship Name	Hull no.	Builder	Laid down	Launched	Comm./Recomm.	Decomm.	Fate
Balao	SS-285	Portsmouth Naval Shipyard, Kittery, Maine	26 Jun 1942	27 Oct 1942	4 Feb 1943	20 Aug 1946	AGSS 1 Apr 1960; struck 1 Aug 1963, sunk as target 4 Sep 1963, conning tower preserved as memorial at US Navy Museum, Washington Navy Yard, DC
Balao	SS-285	Portsmouth Naval Shipyard, Kittery, Maine	26 Jun 1942	27 Oct 1942	4 Mar 1952	11 Jul 1963	AGSS 1 Apr 1960; struck 1 Aug 1963, sunk as target 4 Sep 1963, conning tower preserved as memorial at US Navy Museum, Washington Navy Yard, DC
Billfish	SS-286	Portsmouth Naval Shipyard, Kittery, Maine	23 Jul 1942	12 Nov 1942	20 Apr 1943	1 Nov 1946	PT 1960-1968, AGSS 1 Dec 1962; struck 1 Apr 1968, sold for scrap 17 Mar 1971
Billfish	SS-286	Portsmouth Naval Shipyard, Kittery, Maine	23 Jul 1942	12 Nov 1942	1 Jan 1960	1 Apr 1968	PT 1960-1968, AGSS 1 Dec 1962; struck 1 Apr 1968, sold for scrap 17 Mar 1971
Bowfin	SS-287	Portsmouth Naval Shipyard, Kittery, Maine	23 Jul 1942	7 Dec 1942	1 May 1943	12 Feb 1947	PT 1960-1971, AGSS 1 Dec 1962, IXSS 30 Jun 1971; struck 1 Dec 1971, memorial at Pearl Harbor, Hawaii
Bowfin	SS-287	Portsmouth Naval Shipyard, Kittery, Maine	23 Jul 1942	7 Dec 1942	27 Jul 1951	22 Apr 1954	PT 1960-1971, AGSS 1 Dec 1962, IXSS 30 Jun 1971; struck 1 Dec 1971, memorial at Pearl Harbor, Hawaii
Bowfin	SS-287	Portsmouth Naval Shipyard, Kittery, Maine	23 Jul 1942	7 Dec 1942	10 Jan 1960	1 Dec 1971	PT 1960-1971, AGSS 1 Dec 1962, IXSS 30 Jun 1971; struck 1 Dec 1971, memorial at Pearl Harbor, Hawaii
Cabrilla	SS-288	Portsmouth Naval Shipyard, Kittery, Maine	18 Aug 1942	24 Dec 1942	24 May 1943	7 Aug 1946	PT 1960-1968, AGSS 1 Dec 1962; struck 30 Jun 1968, memorial at Galveston, Texas 1968-1971, sold for scrap 18 Apr 1972
Cabrilla	SS-288	Portsmouth Naval Shipyard, Kittery, Maine	18 Aug 1942	24 Dec 1942	May 1960	30 Jun 1968	PT 1960-1968, AGSS 1 Dec 1962; struck 30 Jun 1968, memorial at Galveston, Texas 1968-1971, sold for scrap 18 Apr 1972
Capelin	SS-289	Portsmouth Naval Shipyard, Kittery, Maine	14 Sep 1942	20 Jan 1943	4 Jun 1943	—N/a	Lost to unknown cause, c. 2 Dec 1943
Cisco	SS-290	Portsmouth Naval Shipyard, Kittery, Maine	29 Oct 1942	24 Dec 1942	10 May 1943	—N/a	Lost to Japanese air and surface attack, 28 Sep 1943
Crevalle	SS-291	Portsmouth Naval Shipyard, Kittery, Maine	14 Nov 1942	22 Feb 1943	24 Jun 1943	29 Jul 1946	AGSS 1 Apr 1960, PT 1962-1968; struck 15 Apr 1968, sold for scrap 17 Mar 1971
Crevalle	SS-291	Portsmouth Naval Shipyard, Kittery, Maine	14 Nov 1942	22 Feb 1943	6 Sep 1951	19 Aug 1955	AGSS 1 Apr 1960, PT 1962-1968; struck 15 Apr 1968, sold for scrap 17 Mar 1971
Crevalle	SS-291	Portsmouth Naval Shipyard, Kittery, Maine	14 Nov 1942	22 Feb 1943	11 Apr 1957	9 Mar 1962	AGSS 1 Apr 1960, PT 1962-1968; struck 15 Apr 1968, sold for scrap 17 Mar 1971
Devilfish	SS-292	Cramp Shipbuilding Company, Philadelphia, Pennsylvania	31 Mar 1942	30 May 1943	1 Sep 1944	30 Sep 1946	AGSS 1 Dec 1962; struck 1 Mar 1967, used for explosives tests, sunk as a target off San Francisco, California 14 Aug 1968
Dragonet	SS-293	Cramp Shipbuilding Company, Philadelphia, Pennsylvania	28 Apr 1942	18 Apr 1943	6 Mar 1944	16 Apr 1946	Struck 1 Jun 1961, scuttled in Chesapeake Bayafter tests 17 Sep 1961
Escolar	SS-294	Cramp Shipbuilding Company, Philadelphia, Pennsylvania	10 Jun 1942	18 Apr 1943	2 Jun 1944	—N/a	Lost to unknown cause, probably Japanese mine, 17 Oct 1944
Hackleback	SS-295	Cramp Shipbuilding Company, Philadelphia, Pennsylvania	15 Aug 1942	30 May 1943	7 Nov 1944	20 Mar 1946	AGSS 1 Dec 1962; struck 1 Mar 1967, sold for scrap 4 Dec 1968
Lancetfish	SS-296	Cramp Shipbuilding Company, Philadelphia, Pennsylvania/Boston Naval Shipyard	30 Sep 1942	15 Aug 1943	12 Feb 1945	24 Mar 1945	Flooded and sank Boston Naval Shipyard 15 Mar 1945, raised but not repaired, listed with the reserve fleet; struck 9 Jun 1958, sold for scrap 20 Aug 1959
Ling	SS-297	Cramp Shipbuilding Company, Philadelphia, Pennsylvania/Boston Naval Shipyard	2 Nov 1942	15 Aug 1943	8 Jun 1945	26 Oct 1946	PT 1960-1971, AGSS 1 Dec 1962, IXSS 30 Jun 1971; struck 1 Dec 1971, memorial at Hackensack, New Jersey
Ling	SS-297	Cramp Shipbuilding Company, Philadelphia, Pennsylvania/Boston Naval Shipyard	2 Nov 1942	15 Aug 1943	March 1960	1 Dec 1971	PT 1960-1971, AGSS 1 Dec 1962, IXSS 30 Jun 1971; struck 1 Dec 1971, memorial at Hackensack, New Jersey
Lionfish	SS-298	Cramp Shipbuilding Company, Philadelphia, Pennsylvania/Portsmouth Naval Shipyard, Kittery, Maine	15 Dec 1942	7 Nov 1943	1 Nov 1944	16 Jan 1946	PT 1960-1971, AGSS 1 Dec 1962, IXSS 30 Jun 1971; struck 20 Dec 1971, memorial at Fall River, Massachusetts
Lionfish	SS-298	Cramp Shipbuilding Company, Philadelphia, Pennsylvania/Portsmouth Naval Shipyard, Kittery, Maine	15 Dec 1942	7 Nov 1943	31 Jan 1951	15 Dec 1953	PT 1960-1971, AGSS 1 Dec 1962, IXSS 30 Jun 1971; struck 20 Dec 1971, memorial at Fall River, Massachusetts
Lionfish	SS-298	Cramp Shipbuilding Company, Philadelphia, Pennsylvania/Portsmouth Naval Shipyard, Kittery, Maine	15 Dec 1942	7 Nov 1943	1 Mar 1960	20 Dec 1971	PT 1960-1971, AGSS 1 Dec 1962, IXSS 30 Jun 1971; struck 20 Dec 1971, memorial at Fall River, Massachusetts
Manta	SS-299	Cramp Shipbuilding Company, Philadelphia, Pennsylvania/Portsmouth Naval Shipyard, Kittery, Maine	15 Jan 1943	7 Nov 1943	18 Dec 1944	10 Jun 1946	AGSS 16 Aug 1949, target ship 1949-1953, PT 1960-1967, hull tests 1967-1969; struck 30 Jun 1967, sunk as target 16 Jul 1969
Manta	SS-299	Cramp Shipbuilding Company, Philadelphia, Pennsylvania/Portsmouth Naval Shipyard, Kittery, Maine	15 Jan 1943	7 Nov 1943	2 Aug 1949	6 Dec 1955	AGSS 16 Aug 1949, target ship 1949-1953, PT 1960-1967, hull tests 1967-1969; struck 30 Jun 1967, sunk as target 16 Jul 1969
Manta	SS-299	Cramp Shipbuilding Company, Philadelphia, Pennsylvania/Portsmouth Naval Shipyard, Kittery, Maine	15 Jan 1943	7 Nov 1943	1 Apr 1960	30 Jun 1967	AGSS 16 Aug 1949, target ship 1949-1953, PT 1960-1967, hull tests 1967-1969; struck 30 Jun 1967, sunk as target 16 Jul 1969
Moray	SS-300	Cramp Shipbuilding Company, Philadelphia, Pennsylvania	21 Apr 1943	14 May 1944	26 Jan 1945	12 Apr 1946	AGSS 1 Dec 1962; struck 1 Apr 1967, sunk as target 18 Jun 1970
Roncador	SS-301	Cramp Shipbuilding Company, Philadelphia, Pennsylvania	21 Apr 1943	14 May 1944	8 Jun 1945	26 Oct 1946	PT 1960-1971, AGSS 1 Dec 1962, IXSS 30 Jun 1971; struck 1 Dec 1971, sold for scrap 1 Feb 1973, conning tower internals preserved at US Navy Museum, Washington Navy Yard, DC, external fairwater preserved at Naval Base Point Loma, San Diego, California
Roncador	SS-301	Cramp Shipbuilding Company, Philadelphia, Pennsylvania	21 Apr 1943	14 May 1944	February 1960	1 Dec 1971	PT 1960-1971, AGSS 1 Dec 1962, IXSS 30 Jun 1971; struck 1 Dec 1971, sold for scrap 1 Feb 1973, conning tower internals preserved at US Navy Museum, Washington Navy Yard, DC, external fairwater preserved at Naval Base Point Loma, San Diego, California
Sabalo	SS-302	Cramp Shipbuilding Company, Philadelphia, Pennsylvania	5 Jun 1943	4 Jun 1944	19 Jun 1945	7 Aug 1946	FS 1952; struck 1 Jul 1971, sunk as target 21 Feb 1973
Sabalo	SS-302	Cramp Shipbuilding Company, Philadelphia, Pennsylvania	5 Jun 1943	4 Jun 1944	1 Jun 1951	1 Jul 1971	FS 1952; struck 1 Jul 1971, sunk as target 21 Feb 1973
Sablefish	SS-303	Cramp Shipbuilding Company, Philadelphia, Pennsylvania	5 Jun 1943	4 Jun 1944	18 Dec 1945	1 Nov 1969	FS 1951, AGSS 30 Jun 1969; struck 1 Nov 1969, sold for scrap 29 Jul 1971
Seahorse	SS-304	Mare Island Naval Shipyard, Vallejo, California	1 Jul 1942	9 Jan 1943	31 Mar 1943	2 Mar 1946	AGSS 1 Dec 1962; struck 1 Mar 1967, sold for scrap 4 Dec 1968
Skate	SS-305	Mare Island Naval Shipyard, Vallejo, California	1 Aug 1942	4 Mar 1943	15 Apr 1943	11 Dec 1946	Operation Crossroads nuclear weapons tests July 1946; sunk as target 5 Oct 1948, struck 21 Oct 1948
Tang	SS-306	Mare Island Naval Shipyard, Vallejo, California	15 Jan 1943	17 Aug 1943	15 Oct 1943	—N/a	Lost due to circular run of own torpedo, 24 Oct 1944
Tilefish	SS-307	Mare Island Naval Shipyard, Vallejo, California	10 Mar 1943	25 Oct 1943	15 Dec 1943	12 Oct 1959	FS 1960, transferred to Venezuela as Carite 4 May 1960; struck 1 Dec 1960, decommissioned by Venezuela for spare parts 28 Jan 1977
Tilefish	SS-307	Mare Island Naval Shipyard, Vallejo, California	10 Mar 1943	25 Oct 1943	30 Jan 1960	4 May 1960	FS 1960, transferred to Venezuela as Carite 4 May 1960; struck 1 Dec 1960, decommissioned by Venezuela for spare parts 28 Jan 1977
Apogon	SS-308	Portsmouth Naval Shipyard, Kittery, Maine	9 Dec 1942	10 Mar 1943	16 Jul 1943	—N/a	Converted to remote control, sunk in Operation Crossroads nuclear weapons tests 25 Jul 1946; struck 25 Feb 1947
Aspro	SS-309	Portsmouth Naval Shipyard, Kittery, Maine	27 Dec 1942	7 Apr 1943	31 Jul 1943	30 Jan 1946	AGSS 1 Jul 1960; struck 7 Sep 1962, sunk as target 16 Nov 1962
Aspro	SS-309	Portsmouth Naval Shipyard, Kittery, Maine	27 Dec 1942	7 Apr 1943	23 Sep 1951	30 Apr 1954	AGSS 1 Jul 1960; struck 7 Sep 1962, sunk as target 16 Nov 1962
Aspro	SS-309	Portsmouth Naval Shipyard, Kittery, Maine	27 Dec 1942	7 Apr 1943	4 May 1957	7 Sep 1962	AGSS 1 Jul 1960; struck 7 Sep 1962, sunk as target 16 Nov 1962
Batfish	SS-310	Portsmouth Naval Shipyard, Kittery, Maine	27 Dec 1942	5 May 1943	21 Aug 1943	6 Apr 1946	AGSS 1 Dec 1962, PT 1960-1969; struck 1 Nov 1969, memorial at Muskogee, Oklahoma
Batfish	SS-310	Portsmouth Naval Shipyard, Kittery, Maine	27 Dec 1942	5 May 1943	7 Mar 1952	January 1960	AGSS 1 Dec 1962, PT 1960-1969; struck 1 Nov 1969, memorial at Muskogee, Oklahoma
Batfish	SS-310	Portsmouth Naval Shipyard, Kittery, Maine	27 Dec 1942	5 May 1943	January 1960	1 Nov 1969	AGSS 1 Dec 1962, PT 1960-1969; struck 1 Nov 1969, memorial at Muskogee, Oklahoma
Archerfish	SS-311	Portsmouth Naval Shipyard, Kittery, Maine	22 Jan 1943	28 May 1943	4 Sep 1943	12 Jun 1946	AGSS 22 Feb 1960; struck 1 May 1968, sunk as target 19 Oct 1968
Archerfish	SS-311	Portsmouth Naval Shipyard, Kittery, Maine	22 Jan 1943	28 May 1943	7 Mar 1952	21 Oct 1955	AGSS 22 Feb 1960; struck 1 May 1968, sunk as target 19 Oct 1968
Archerfish	SS-311	Portsmouth Naval Shipyard, Kittery, Maine	22 Jan 1943	28 May 1943	1 Aug 1957	1 May 1968	AGSS 22 Feb 1960; struck 1 May 1968, sunk as target 19 Oct 1968
Burrfish	SS-312	Portsmouth Naval Shipyard, Kittery, Maine	24 Feb 1943	18 Jun 1943	13 Sep 1943	10 Oct 1946	SSR 1 Feb 1949, SS 15 Jan 1961, transferred to Canada as Grilse 11 May 1961; returned to US and struck 19 Jul 1969, sunk as target 19 Nov 1969
Burrfish	SS-312	Portsmouth Naval Shipyard, Kittery, Maine	24 Feb 1943	18 Jun 1943	2 Nov 1948	17 Dec 1956	SSR 1 Feb 1949, SS 15 Jan 1961, transferred to Canada as Grilse 11 May 1961; returned to US and struck 19 Jul 1969, sunk as target 19 Nov 1969
Burrfish	SS-312	Portsmouth Naval Shipyard, Kittery, Maine	24 Feb 1943	18 Jun 1943	17 Jan 1961	11 May 1961	SSR 1 Feb 1949, SS 15 Jan 1961, transferred to Canada as Grilse 11 May 1961; returned to US and struck 19 Jul 1969, sunk as target 19 Nov 1969
Perch	SS-313	Electric Boat Company, Groton, Connecticut	5 Jan 1943	12 Sep 1943	7 Jan 1944	15 Jan 1947	SSP 20 Jan 1948, ASSP 31 Jan 1950, APSS 24 Oct 1956, PT 1967-1971, LPSS 1 Jan 1969, IXSS 30 Jun 1971; struck 1 Dec 1971, sold for scrap 15 Jan 1973
Perch	SS-313	Electric Boat Company, Groton, Connecticut	5 Jan 1943	12 Sep 1943	20 May 1948	31 Mar 1960	SSP 20 Jan 1948, ASSP 31 Jan 1950, APSS 24 Oct 1956, PT 1967-1971, LPSS 1 Jan 1969, IXSS 30 Jun 1971; struck 1 Dec 1971, sold for scrap 15 Jan 1973
Perch	SS-313	Electric Boat Company, Groton, Connecticut	5 Jan 1943	12 Sep 1943	11 Nov 1961	27 May 1967	SSP 20 Jan 1948, ASSP 31 Jan 1950, APSS 24 Oct 1956, PT 1967-1971, LPSS 1 Jan 1969, IXSS 30 Jun 1971; struck 1 Dec 1971, sold for scrap 15 Jan 1973
Shark	SS-314	Electric Boat Company, Groton, Connecticut	28 Jan 1943	17 Oct 1943	14 Feb 1944	—N/a	Lost to Japanese surface attack, 24 Oct 1944
Sealion	SS-315	Electric Boat Company, Groton, Connecticut	25 Feb 1943	31 Oct 1943	8 Mar 1944	16 Feb 1946	SSP 5 Apr 1948, ASSP 31 Jan 1950, APSS 24 Oct 1956, PT 1960-1961, LPSS 1 Jan 1969; struck 15 Mar 1977, test hulk, sunk as target 8 Jul 1978
Sealion	SS-315	Electric Boat Company, Groton, Connecticut	25 Feb 1943	31 Oct 1943	2 Nov 1948	30 Jun 1960	SSP 5 Apr 1948, ASSP 31 Jan 1950, APSS 24 Oct 1956, PT 1960-1961, LPSS 1 Jan 1969; struck 15 Mar 1977, test hulk, sunk as target 8 Jul 1978
Sealion	SS-315	Electric Boat Company, Groton, Connecticut	25 Feb 1943	31 Oct 1943	20 Oct 1961	20 Feb 1970	SSP 5 Apr 1948, ASSP 31 Jan 1950, APSS 24 Oct 1956, PT 1960-1961, LPSS 1 Jan 1969; struck 15 Mar 1977, test hulk, sunk as target 8 Jul 1978
Barbel	SS-316	Electric Boat Company, Groton, Connecticut	11 Mar 1943	14 Nov 1943	3 Apr 1944	—N/a	Lost to Japanese air attack, 4 Feb 1945
Barbero	SS-317	Electric Boat Company, Groton, Connecticut	25 Mar 1943	12 Dec 1943	29 Apr 1944	30 Jun 1950	SSA 5 Apr 1948, ASSA 31 Jan 1950, SSG 25 Oct 1955; struck 1 Jul 1964, sunk as target 7 Oct 1964
Barbero	SS-317	Electric Boat Company, Groton, Connecticut	25 Mar 1943	12 Dec 1943	28 Oct 1955	30 Jun 1964	SSA 5 Apr 1948, ASSA 31 Jan 1950, SSG 25 Oct 1955; struck 1 Jul 1964, sunk as target 7 Oct 1964
Baya	SS-318	Electric Boat Company, Groton, Connecticut	8 Apr 1943	2 Jan 1944	20 May 1944	14 May 1946	AGSS 16 Aug 1949 (sonar tests); struck 30 Oct 1972, sold for scrap October 1973
Baya	SS-318	Electric Boat Company, Groton, Connecticut	8 Apr 1943	2 Jan 1944	10 Feb 1948	30 Oct 1972	AGSS 16 Aug 1949 (sonar tests); struck 30 Oct 1972, sold for scrap October 1973
Becuna	SS-319	Electric Boat Company, Groton, Connecticut	29 Apr 1943	30 Jan 1944	27 May 1944	7 Nov 1969	G IA 1951, AGSS 1 Oct 1969, SS 30 Jun 1971; struck 15 Aug 1973, memorial at Philadelphia, PA
Bergall	SS-320	Electric Boat Company, Groton, Connecticut	13 May 1943	16 Feb 1944	12 Jun 1944	18 Oct 1958	FS 1952, transferred to Turkey 18 Oct 1958 as Turgutreis; sold to Turkey and struck 15 Feb 1973, decommissioned by Turkey 5 Apr 1983, renamed Ceryah Botu 6, receiving ship at Gölcük Naval Base until sold for scrap in 2000
Besugo	SS-321	Electric Boat Company, Groton, Connecticut	27 May 1943	27 Feb 1944	19 Jun 1944	21 Mar 1958	AGSS 1 Dec 1962, FS 1966, transferred to Italy 31 Mar 1966 as Francesco Morosini; returned to US custody and struck 15 Nov 1975, sold for scrap 16 Apr 1976
Blackfin	SS-322	Electric Boat Company, Groton, Connecticut	10 Jun 1943	12 Mar 1944	4 Jul 1944	19 Nov 1948	G IA 1951; struck 15 Sep 1972, sunk as target 13 May 1973
Blackfin	SS-322	Electric Boat Company, Groton, Connecticut	10 Jun 1943	12 Mar 1944	15 May 1951	15 Sep 1972	G IA 1951; struck 15 Sep 1972, sunk as target 13 May 1973
Caiman	SS-323	Electric Boat Company, Groton, Connecticut	24 Jun 1943	30 Mar 1944	17 Jul 1944	30 Jun 1972	G IA 1951, sold to Turkey 30 Jun 1972 as Dumlupinar (S339); decommissioned by Turkey 6 Feb 1983, renamed Ceryan Botu (Y-1247), battery charging hulk at Gölcük Naval Base; sold for scrap 15 Sep 1986
Blenny	SS-324	Electric Boat Company, Groton, Connecticut	8 Jul 1943	9 Apr 1944	27 Jul 1944	7 Nov 1969	G IA 1951, AGSS 1 Oct 1969, SS 30 Jun 1971; struck 15 Aug 1973, scuttled 7 Jun 1989 as part of artificial reef near Ocean City, Maryland
Blower	SS-325	Electric Boat Company, Groton, Connecticut	15 Jul 1943	23 Apr 1944	10 Aug 1944	16 Nov 1950	FS 1950, transferred to Turkey 16 Nov 1950 as Dumlupinar (D-6); struck 20 Dec 1950 (probably purchased by Turkey), lost due to collision with MV Naboland 4 Apr 1953.
Blueback	SS-326	Electric Boat Company, Groton, Connecticut	29 Jul 1943	7 May 1944	28 Aug 1944	23 May 1948	Transferred to Turkey 23 May 1948 as Ikinci İnönü, struck 28 May 1948, FS 1953; decommissioned by Turkey 30 Nov 1973 and returned to US custody, fate unknown
Boarfish	SS-327	Electric Boat Company, Groton, Connecticut	12 Aug 1943	21 May 1944	23 Sep 1944	23 May 1948	Transferred to Turkey 23 May 1948 as Sakarya, struck 28 May 1948, FS 1953; decommissioned by Turkey 12 Dec 1975, returned to US custody and sold for scrap 1980
Charr	SS-328	Electric Boat Company, Groton, Connecticut	26 Aug 1943	28 May 1944	23 Sep 1944	28 Jun 1969	FS 1951, AGSS 1 Jul 1966, PT 1969-1971, IXSS 30 Jun 1971; struck 20 Dec 1971, sold for scrap 17 Aug 1972
Charr	SS-328	Electric Boat Company, Groton, Connecticut	26 Aug 1943	28 May 1944	28 Jun 1969	20 Dec 1971	FS 1951, AGSS 1 Jul 1966, PT 1969-1971, IXSS 30 Jun 1971; struck 20 Dec 1971, sold for scrap 17 Aug 1972
Chub	SS-329	Electric Boat Company, Groton, Connecticut	16 Sep 1943	18 Jun 1944	21 Oct 1944	23 May 1948	Transferred to Turkey 25 May 1948 as Gür, struck 28 May 1948, FS 1953; decommissioned by Turkey 12 Dec 1975 and returned to US custody, sold for scrap 22 May 1976
Brill	SS-330	Electric Boat Company, Groton, Connecticut	23 Sep 1943	25 Jun 1944	26 Oct 1944	23 May 1948	Transferred to Turkey 25 May 1948 as Birinci İnönü, struck 28 May 1948, FS 1953; decommissioned by Turkey 29 Nov 1972 and returned to US custody, fate unknown
Bugara	SS-331	Electric Boat Company, Groton, Connecticut	21 Oct 1943	2 Jul 1944	15 Nov 1944	1 Oct 1970	FS 1951, AGSS 30 Jun 1969, SS 1 Oct 1969; struck 1 Oct 1970, slated to be sunk as target but sank under tow 1 Jun 1971
Bullhead	SS-332	Electric Boat Company, Groton, Connecticut	21 Oct 1943	16 Jul 1944	4 Dec 1944	—N/a	Lost to Japanese air attack, 6 Aug 1945
Bumper	SS-333	Electric Boat Company, Groton, Connecticut	6 Nov 1943	6 Aug 1944	9 Dec 1944	16 Nov 1950	FS 1950, transferred to Turkey 16 Nov 1950 as Çanakkale, struck 20 Dec 1950; decommissioned by Turkey 8 Nov 1976, fate unknown
Cabezon	SS-334	Electric Boat Company, Groton, Connecticut	18 Nov 1943	27 Aug 1944	30 Dec 1944	24 Oct 1953	AGSS 1 Dec 1962, PT 1960-1970; struck 15 May 1970, sold for scrap 28 Dec 1971
Cabezon	SS-334	Electric Boat Company, Groton, Connecticut	18 Nov 1943	27 Aug 1944	April 1960	15 May 1970	AGSS 1 Dec 1962, PT 1960-1970; struck 15 May 1970, sold for scrap 28 Dec 1971
Dentuda	SS-335	Electric Boat Company, Groton, Connecticut	18 Nov 1943	10 Sep 1944	30 Dec 1944	11 Dec 1946	Operation Crossroads nuclear weapons tests July 1946, PT 1946-1967, AGSS 1 Dec 1962; struck 30 Jun 1967, sold for scrap 12 Feb 1969
Dentuda	SS-335	Electric Boat Company, Groton, Connecticut	18 Nov 1943	10 Sep 1944	11 Dec 1946	30 Jun 1967	Operation Crossroads nuclear weapons tests July 1946, PT 1946-1967, AGSS 1 Dec 1962; struck 30 Jun 1967, sold for scrap 12 Feb 1969
Capitaine	SS-336	Electric Boat Company, Groton, Connecticut	2 Dec 1943	1 Oct 1944	26 Jan 1945	10 Feb 1950	AGSS 1 Jul 1960, FS 1966, transferred to Italy 4 Mar 1966 as Alfredo Cappellini; struck and sold to Italy 5 Dec 1977, fate unknown
Capitaine	SS-336	Electric Boat Company, Groton, Connecticut	2 Dec 1943	1 Oct 1944	23 Feb 1957	4 Mar 1966	AGSS 1 Jul 1960, FS 1966, transferred to Italy 4 Mar 1966 as Alfredo Cappellini; struck and sold to Italy 5 Dec 1977, fate unknown
Carbonero	SS-337	Electric Boat Company, Groton, Connecticut	16 Dec 1943	15 Oct 1944	7 Feb 1945	1 Dec 1970	Loon missile test launcher 1949, FS 1952, AGSS 30 Jun 1969, SS 1 Oct 1969, struck 1 Dec 1970, sunk as target 27 Apr 1975
Carp	SS-338	Electric Boat Company, Groton, Connecticut	23 Dec 1943	12 Nov 1944	28 Feb 1945	18 Mar 1968	FS 1952, AGSS 1 May 1968, PT 1968-1971, IXSS 30 Jun 1971; struck 20 Dec 1971, sold for scrap 26 Jul 1973
Carp	SS-338	Electric Boat Company, Groton, Connecticut	23 Dec 1943	12 Nov 1944	18 Mar 1968	20 Dec 1971	FS 1952, AGSS 1 May 1968, PT 1968-1971, IXSS 30 Jun 1971; struck 20 Dec 1971, sold for scrap 26 Jul 1973
Catfish	SS-339	Electric Boat Company, Groton, Connecticut	6 Jan 1944	19 Nov 1944	19 Mar 1945	1 Jul 1971	G II 1949, struck and sold to Argentina 1 Jul 1971 as Santa Fe (S-21); damaged, grounded, and abandoned following British air attack 25 Apr 1982, scuttled 10 Feb 1985
Entemedor	SS-340	Electric Boat Company, Groton, Connecticut	3 Feb 1944	17 Dec 1944	6 Apr 1945	10 Dec 1948	G IIA 1952; struck and sold to Turkey 31 Jul 1972 as Preveze; decommissioned by Turkey 20 Mar 1986, fate unknown
Entemedor	SS-340	Electric Boat Company, Groton, Connecticut	3 Feb 1944	17 Dec 1944	24 Oct 1950	31 Jul 1972	G IIA 1952; struck and sold to Turkey 31 Jul 1972 as Preveze; decommissioned by Turkey 20 Mar 1986, fate unknown
Chivo	SS-341	Electric Boat Company, Groton, Connecticut	21 Feb 1944	14 Jan 1945	28 Apr 1945	1 Jul 1971	G IA 1951; struck and sold to Argentina 1 Jul 1971 as Santiago del Estero (S-22); decommissioned by Argentina January 1981, sold for scrap 1983
Chopper	SS-342	Electric Boat Company, Groton, Connecticut	2 Mar 1944	4 Feb 1945	25 May 1945	27 Aug 1969	G IA 1951, AGSS 15 Sep 1969, PT 1969-1971, IXSS 30 Jun 1971; struck 1 Oct 1971, salvage and rescue hulk, sunk 21 Jul 1976 while being rigged as underwater target
Clamagore	SS-343	Electric Boat Company, Groton, Connecticut	16 Mar 1944	25 Feb 1945	28 Jun 1945	12 Jun 1973	G II 1948, G III 1962; struck 12 Jun 1975, memorial at Patriots' Point, Mount Pleasant, South Carolina
Cobbler	SS-344	Electric Boat Company, Groton, Connecticut	3 Apr 1944	1 Apr 1945	8 Aug 1945	21 Nov 1973	G II 1949, G III 1962; struck and sold to Turkey 21 Nov 1973 as Çanakkale; decommissioned by Turkey 22 Jan 1998, fate unknown
Cochino	SS-345	Electric Boat Company, Groton, Connecticut	13 Apr 1944	20 Apr 1945	25 Aug 1945	—N/a	G II 1949; lost due to battery fire 26 Aug 1949
Corporal	SS-346	Electric Boat Company, Groton, Connecticut	27 Apr 1944	10 Jun 1945	9 Nov 1945	21 Nov 1973	G II 1948, G III 1962; struck and sold to Turkey 21 Nov 1973 as Ikinci İnönü; decommissioned by Turkey 2 Sep 1996, fate unknown
Cubera	SS-347	Electric Boat Company, Groton, Connecticut	11 May 1944	17 Jun 1945	19 Dec 1945	5 Jan 1972	G II 1948; struck and sold to Venezuela 5 Jan 1972 as Tiburon; decommissioned by Venezuela and sold for scrap February 1987
Cusk	SS-348	Electric Boat Company, Groton, Connecticut	25 May 1944	28 Jul 1945	5 Feb 1946	24 Sep 1969	SSG (Loon missile test launcher) 20 Jan 1948, FS 1954, SS 1 Jul 1954, AGSS 30 Jun 1969; struck 24 Sep 1969, sold for scrap 26 Jun 1972
Diodon	SS-349	Electric Boat Company, Groton, Connecticut	1 Jun 1944	10 Sep 1945	18 Mar 1946	15 Jan 1971	G II 1948; struck 15 Jan 1971, sold for scrap 12 May 1972
Dogfish	SS-350	Electric Boat Company, Groton, Connecticut	22 Jun 1944	27 Oct 1945	29 Apr 1946	28 Jul 1972	G II 1948; struck and sold to Brazil 28 Jul 1972 as Guanabara, deleted by Brazil and sold for scrap 1983
Greenfish	SS-351	Electric Boat Company, Groton, Connecticut	29 Jun 1944	21 Dec 1945	7 Jun 1946	19 Dec 1973	G II 1948, G III 1961; struck and sold to Brazil 19 Dec 1973 as Amazonas, struck by Brazil 15 Oct 1992, sold for scrap 30 Jan 2004
Halfbeak	SS-352	Electric Boat Company, Groton, Connecticut	6 Jul 1944	19 Feb 1946	22 Jul 1946	1 Jul 1971	G II 1948; struck 1 Jul 1971, sold for scrap 13 Jun 1972
Dugong	SS-353	Electric Boat Company, Groton, Connecticut	—N/a	—N/a	—N/a	—N/a	Cancelled 23 Oct 1944 as of 29 Jul 1944
Eel	SS-354	Electric Boat Company, Groton, Connecticut	—N/a	—N/a	—N/a	—N/a	Cancelled 23 Oct 1944 as of 29 Jul 1944
Espada	SS-355	Electric Boat Company, Groton, Connecticut	—N/a	—N/a	—N/a	—N/a	Cancelled 23 Oct 1944 as of 29 Jul 1944
Jawfish (ex-Fanegal)	SS-356	Electric Boat Company, Groton, Connecticut	—N/a	—N/a	—N/a	—N/a	Cancelled 29 Jul 1944
Ono (ex-Friar)	SS-357	Electric Boat Company, Groton, Connecticut	—N/a	—N/a	—N/a	—N/a	Cancelled 29 Jul 1944
Garlopa	SS-358	Electric Boat Company, Groton, Connecticut	—N/a	—N/a	—N/a	—N/a	Cancelled 29 Jul 1944
Garrupa	SS-359	Electric Boat Company, Groton, Connecticut	—N/a	—N/a	—N/a	—N/a	Cancelled 29 Jul 1944
Goldring	SS-360	Electric Boat Company, Groton, Connecticut	—N/a	—N/a	—N/a	—N/a	Cancelled 29 Jul 1944
Hardhead	SS-365	Manitowoc Shipbuilding Company, Manitowoc, Wisconsin	7 Jul 1943	12 Dec 1943	18 Apr 1944	10 May 1946	G IIA 1953; struck and sold to Greece 26 Jul 1972 as Papanikolis, decommissioned by Greece 31 Dec 1992, fate unknown
Hardhead	SS-365	Manitowoc Shipbuilding Company, Manitowoc, Wisconsin	7 Jul 1943	12 Dec 1943	6 Feb 1952	22 May 1952	G IIA 1953; struck and sold to Greece 26 Jul 1972 as Papanikolis, decommissioned by Greece 31 Dec 1992, fate unknown
Hardhead	SS-365	Manitowoc Shipbuilding Company, Manitowoc, Wisconsin	7 Jul 1943	12 Dec 1943	24 Mar 1953	26 Jul 1972	G IIA 1953; struck and sold to Greece 26 Jul 1972 as Papanikolis, decommissioned by Greece 31 Dec 1992, fate unknown
Hawkbill	SS-366	Manitowoc Shipbuilding Company, Manitowoc, Wisconsin	7 Aug 1943	9 Jan 1944	17 May 1944	20 Sep 1946	G IB 1952; transferred to the Netherlands 21 Apr 1953 as Zeeleeuw, struck and sold to the Netherlands 20 Feb 1970; decommissioned by the Netherlands and sold for scrap 24 Nov 1970
Hawkbill	SS-366	Manitowoc Shipbuilding Company, Manitowoc, Wisconsin	7 Aug 1943	9 Jan 1944	10 Dec 1952	21 Apr 1953	G IB 1952; transferred to the Netherlands 21 Apr 1953 as Zeeleeuw, struck and sold to the Netherlands 20 Feb 1970; decommissioned by the Netherlands and sold for scrap 24 Nov 1970
Icefish	SS-367	Manitowoc Shipbuilding Company, Manitowoc, Wisconsin	4 Sep 1943	20 Feb 1944	10 Jun 1944	21 Jun 1946	G IB 1952; transferred to the Netherlands 21 Feb 1953 as Walrus; returned to US custody and struck 15 Jul 1971, sold for scrap 15 Aug 1971
Icefish	SS-367	Manitowoc Shipbuilding Company, Manitowoc, Wisconsin	4 Sep 1943	20 Feb 1944	5 May 1952	29 Jul 1952	G IB 1952; transferred to the Netherlands 21 Feb 1953 as Walrus; returned to US custody and struck 15 Jul 1971, sold for scrap 15 Aug 1971
Icefish	SS-367	Manitowoc Shipbuilding Company, Manitowoc, Wisconsin	4 Sep 1943	20 Feb 1944	10 Dec 1952	21 Feb 1953	G IB 1952; transferred to the Netherlands 21 Feb 1953 as Walrus; returned to US custody and struck 15 Jul 1971, sold for scrap 15 Aug 1971
Jallao	SS-368	Manitowoc Shipbuilding Company, Manitowoc, Wisconsin	29 Sep 1943	12 Mar 1944	8 Jul 1944	30 Sep 1946	G IIA 1954; struck and sold to Spain 26 Jun 1974 as Narcíso Monturiol (S-35); decommissioned by Spain on unknown date, scuttled 31 Dec 1984
Jallao	SS-368	Manitowoc Shipbuilding Company, Manitowoc, Wisconsin	29 Sep 1943	12 Mar 1944	4 Dec 1953	26 Jun 1974	G IIA 1954; struck and sold to Spain 26 Jun 1974 as Narcíso Monturiol (S-35); decommissioned by Spain on unknown date, scuttled 31 Dec 1984
Kete	SS-369	Manitowoc Shipbuilding Company, Manitowoc, Wisconsin	25 Oct 1943	9 Apr 1944	31 Jul 1944	—N/a	Lost, possibly to Japanese submarine attack or mine, c. 20 Mar 1945
Kraken	SS-370	Manitowoc Shipbuilding Company, Manitowoc, Wisconsin	13 Dec 1943	30 Apr 1944	8 Sep 1944	4 May 1948	FS 1959; transferred to Spain 24 Oct 1959 as Almirante García de los Reyes, decommissioned by Spain 16 Sep 1974, struck and sold to Spain 1 Nov 1974, recommissioned by Spain 1 Sep 1975 due to casualty to Narciso Monturiol (S-33), decommissioned by Spain April 1981, struck by Spain and sold for scrap 1 Apr 1982
Kraken	SS-370	Manitowoc Shipbuilding Company, Manitowoc, Wisconsin	13 Dec 1943	30 Apr 1944	4 Jul 1959	24 Oct 1959	FS 1959; transferred to Spain 24 Oct 1959 as Almirante García de los Reyes, decommissioned by Spain 16 Sep 1974, struck and sold to Spain 1 Nov 1974, recommissioned by Spain 1 Sep 1975 due to casualty to Narciso Monturiol (S-33), decommissioned by Spain April 1981, struck by Spain and sold for scrap 1 Apr 1982
Lagarto	SS-371	Manitowoc Shipbuilding Company, Manitowoc, Wisconsin	12 Jan 1944	28 May 1944	14 Oct 1944	—N/a	Lost to Japanese surface attack 4 May 1945
Lamprey	SS-372	Manitowoc Shipbuilding Company, Manitowoc, Wisconsin	28 Feb 1944	18 Jun 1944	17 Nov 1944	3 Jun 1946	Transferred to Argentina 21 Aug 1960 as Santiago del Estero; struck and sold to Argentina 1 Sep 1971, scrapped for spare parts 1971
Lamprey	SS-372	Manitowoc Shipbuilding Company, Manitowoc, Wisconsin	28 Feb 1944	18 Jun 1944	1960	21 Aug 1960	Transferred to Argentina 21 Aug 1960 as Santiago del Estero; struck and sold to Argentina 1 Sep 1971, scrapped for spare parts 1971
Lizardfish	SS-373	Manitowoc Shipbuilding Company, Manitowoc, Wisconsin	14 Mar 1944	16 Jul 1944	30 Dec 1944	24 Jun 1946	FS 1959; transferred to Italy 9 Jan 1960 as Evangelista Torricelli; struck 1 Jul 1976 (or 15 Jul 1978), fate unknown
Lizardfish	SS-373	Manitowoc Shipbuilding Company, Manitowoc, Wisconsin	14 Mar 1944	16 Jul 1944	5 Sep 1959	9 Jan 1960	FS 1959; transferred to Italy 9 Jan 1960 as Evangelista Torricelli; struck 1 Jul 1976 (or 15 Jul 1978), fate unknown
Loggerhead	SS-374	Manitowoc Shipbuilding Company, Manitowoc, Wisconsin	1 Apr 1944	13 Aug 1944	9 Feb 1945	16 Jun 1946	PT 1960-1967, AGSS 1 Dec 1962; struck 30 Jun 1967, sold for scrap 29 Aug 1969
Loggerhead	SS-374	Manitowoc Shipbuilding Company, Manitowoc, Wisconsin	1 Apr 1944	13 Aug 1944	1 Jun 1960	30 Jun 1967	PT 1960-1967, AGSS 1 Dec 1962; struck 30 Jun 1967, sold for scrap 29 Aug 1969
Macabi	SS-375	Manitowoc Shipbuilding Company, Manitowoc, Wisconsin	1 May 1944	19 Sep 1944	29 Mar 1945	16 Jun 1946	Transferred to Argentina 11 Aug 1960 as Santa Fe (S-11); struck and sold to Argentina 1 Sep 1971, scrapped for spare parts 1972
Macabi	SS-375	Manitowoc Shipbuilding Company, Manitowoc, Wisconsin	1 May 1944	19 Sep 1944	6 May 1960	11 Aug 1960	Transferred to Argentina 11 Aug 1960 as Santa Fe (S-11); struck and sold to Argentina 1 Sep 1971, scrapped for spare parts 1972
Mapiro	SS-376	Manitowoc Shipbuilding Company, Manitowoc, Wisconsin	30 May 1944	9 Nov 1944	30 Apr 1945	16 Mar 1946	FS 1960; transferred to Turkey 18 Mar 1960 as Pirireis, struck and sold to Turkey 1 Aug 1973; decommissioned by Turkey 20 Nov 1973, used as battery charging hulk through 1975, sold for scrap 1980
Mapiro	SS-376	Manitowoc Shipbuilding Company, Manitowoc, Wisconsin	30 May 1944	9 Nov 1944	14 Nov 1959	18 Mar 1960	FS 1960; transferred to Turkey 18 Mar 1960 as Pirireis, struck and sold to Turkey 1 Aug 1973; decommissioned by Turkey 20 Nov 1973, used as battery charging hulk through 1975, sold for scrap 1980
Menhaden	SS-377	Manitowoc Shipbuilding Company, Manitowoc, Wisconsin	21 Jun 1944	20 Dec 1944	22 Jun 1945	31 May 1946	G IIA 1953; struck 15 Aug 1973, underwater target 1976; sold for scrap 1988
Menhaden	SS-377	Manitowoc Shipbuilding Company, Manitowoc, Wisconsin	21 Jun 1944	20 Dec 1944	7 Aug 1951	13 Aug 1952	G IIA 1953; struck 15 Aug 1973, underwater target 1976; sold for scrap 1988
Menhaden	SS-377	Manitowoc Shipbuilding Company, Manitowoc, Wisconsin	21 Jun 1944	20 Dec 1944	6 Mar 1953	13 Aug 1971	G IIA 1953; struck 15 Aug 1973, underwater target 1976; sold for scrap 1988
Mero	SS-378	Manitowoc Shipbuilding Company, Manitowoc, Wisconsin	22 Jul 1944	17 Jan 1945	17 Aug 1945	15 Jun 1946	FS 1960 (references vary as to completion of this); transferred to Turkey 20 Apr 1960 as Hizireis, struck and sold to Turkey 1 Aug 1973; sold for scrap 9 Oct 1980
Mero	SS-378	Manitowoc Shipbuilding Company, Manitowoc, Wisconsin	22 Jul 1944	17 Jan 1945	29 Dec 1959	20 Apr 1960	FS 1960 (references vary as to completion of this); transferred to Turkey 20 Apr 1960 as Hizireis, struck and sold to Turkey 1 Aug 1973; sold for scrap 9 Oct 1980
Needlefish	SS-379	Manitowoc Shipbuilding Company, Manitowoc, Wisconsin	—N/a	—N/a	—N/a	—N/a	Cancelled 29 Jul 1944
Nerka	SS-380	Manitowoc Shipbuilding Company, Manitowoc, Wisconsin	—N/a	—N/a	—N/a	—N/a	Cancelled 29 Jul 1944
Sand Lance	SS-381	Portsmouth Naval Shipyard, Kittery, Maine	12 Mar 1943	25 Jun 1943	9 Oct 1943	14 Feb 1946	Transferred to Brazil 7 Sep 1963 as Rio Grande do Sul, struck 1 Sep 1972; returned to US control 12 Oct 1972, sold for scrap 1 Jun 1974
Sand Lance	SS-381	Portsmouth Naval Shipyard, Kittery, Maine	12 Mar 1943	25 Jun 1943	6 Apr 1963	7 Sep 1963	Transferred to Brazil 7 Sep 1963 as Rio Grande do Sul, struck 1 Sep 1972; returned to US control 12 Oct 1972, sold for scrap 1 Jun 1974
Picuda	SS-382	Portsmouth Naval Shipyard, Kittery, Maine	15 Mar 1943	12 Jul 1943	16 Oct 1943	25 Sep 1946	Proposed for minelayer conversion that was cancelled 1952, G IIA 1953, transferred to Spain 1 Oct 1972 as Narcíso Monturiol, struck and sold to Spain 18 Nov 1974; decommissioned by Spain 30 Apr 1977, fate unknown
Picuda	SS-382	Portsmouth Naval Shipyard, Kittery, Maine	15 Mar 1943	12 Jul 1943	19 Jun 1953	1 Oct 1972	Proposed for minelayer conversion that was cancelled 1952, G IIA 1953, transferred to Spain 1 Oct 1972 as Narcíso Monturiol, struck and sold to Spain 18 Nov 1974; decommissioned by Spain 30 Apr 1977, fate unknown
Pampanito	SS-383	Portsmouth Naval Shipyard, Kittery, Maine	15 Mar 1943	12 Jul 1943	6 Nov 1943	15 Dec 1945	PT 1960-1971, AGSS 1 Dec 1962, IXSS 30 Jun 1971; struck 20 Dec 1971, memorial in San Francisco, CA
Pampanito	SS-383	Portsmouth Naval Shipyard, Kittery, Maine	15 Mar 1943	12 Jul 1943	April 1960	20 Dec 1971	PT 1960-1971, AGSS 1 Dec 1962, IXSS 30 Jun 1971; struck 20 Dec 1971, memorial in San Francisco, CA
Parche	SS-384	Portsmouth Naval Shipyard, Kittery, Maine	9 Apr 1943	24 Jul 1943	20 Nov 1943	11 Dec 1946	Target in Operation Crossroads nuclear weapons tests July 1946, PT 1948-1969, AGSS 1 Dec 1962; struck 8 Nov 1969, sold for scrap 18 Jun 1970
Parche	SS-384	Portsmouth Naval Shipyard, Kittery, Maine	9 Apr 1943	24 Jul 1943	10 Feb 1948	8 Nov 1969	Target in Operation Crossroads nuclear weapons tests July 1946, PT 1948-1969, AGSS 1 Dec 1962; struck 8 Nov 1969, sold for scrap 18 Jun 1970
Bang	SS-385	Portsmouth Naval Shipyard, Kittery, Maine	30 Apr 1943	30 Aug 1943	4 Dec 1943	12 Feb 1947	G IIA 1952; transferred to Spain 1 Oct 1972 as Cosme García, struck and sold to Spain 18 Nov 1974; decommissioned by Spain and sold for scrap 30 Dec 1982
Bang	SS-385	Portsmouth Naval Shipyard, Kittery, Maine	30 Apr 1943	30 Aug 1943	1 Feb 1951	15 May 1952	G IIA 1952; transferred to Spain 1 Oct 1972 as Cosme García, struck and sold to Spain 18 Nov 1974; decommissioned by Spain and sold for scrap 30 Dec 1982
Bang	SS-385	Portsmouth Naval Shipyard, Kittery, Maine	30 Apr 1943	30 Aug 1943	4 Oct 1952	1 Oct 1972	G IIA 1952; transferred to Spain 1 Oct 1972 as Cosme García, struck and sold to Spain 18 Nov 1974; decommissioned by Spain and sold for scrap 30 Dec 1982
Pilotfish	SS-386	Portsmouth Naval Shipyard, Kittery, Maine	15 May 1943	30 Aug 1943	16 Dec 1943	29 Aug 1946	Sunk in Operation Crossroads nuclear weapons tests 25 Jul 1946, later raised; struck 25 Feb 1947, sunk as target 16 Oct 1948
Pintado	SS-387	Portsmouth Naval Shipyard, Kittery, Maine	7 May 1943	15 Sep 1943	1 Jan 1944	6 Mar 1946	AGSS 1 Dec 1962; struck 1 Mar 1967, sold for scrap 19 Feb 1969
Pipefish	SS-388	Portsmouth Naval Shipyard, Kittery, Maine	31 May 1943	27 Oct 1943	22 Jan 1944	19 Mar 1946	AGSS 1 Dec 1962; struck 1 Mar 1967, sold for scrap 4 Feb 1969
Piranha	SS-389	Portsmouth Naval Shipyard, Kittery, Maine	21 Jun 1943	27 Oct 1943	5 Feb 1944	31 May 1946	AGSS 1 Dec 1962; struck 1 Mar 1967, sold for scrap 11 Aug 1970
Plaice	SS-390	Portsmouth Naval Shipyard, Kittery, Maine	28 Jun 1943	15 Nov 1943	12 Feb 1944	November 1947	Transferred to Brazil 7 Sep 1963 as Bahia, sold to Brazil 1972, struck 1 Apr 1973; sold for scrap 1978 when Brazilian preservation efforts failed
Plaice	SS-390	Portsmouth Naval Shipyard, Kittery, Maine	28 Jun 1943	15 Nov 1943	18 May 1963	7 Sep 1963	Transferred to Brazil 7 Sep 1963 as Bahia, sold to Brazil 1972, struck 1 Apr 1973; sold for scrap 1978 when Brazilian preservation efforts failed
Pomfret	SS-391	Portsmouth Naval Shipyard, Kittery, Maine	14 Jul 1943	27 Oct 1943	19 Feb 1944	April 1952	G IIA 1953; transferred to Turkey 1 Jul 1971 as Oruçreis, struck and sold to Turkey 1 Aug 1973, decommissioned 15 Sep 1986, fate unknown
Pomfret	SS-391	Portsmouth Naval Shipyard, Kittery, Maine	14 Jul 1943	27 Oct 1943	5 Dec 1952	1 Jul 1971	G IIA 1953; transferred to Turkey 1 Jul 1971 as Oruçreis, struck and sold to Turkey 1 Aug 1973, decommissioned 15 Sep 1986, fate unknown
Sterlet	SS-392	Portsmouth Naval Shipyard, Kittery, Maine	14 Jul 1943	27 Oct 1943	4 Mar 1944	18 Sep 1948	FS 1952, BQR-4 bow sonar 1955; struck 1 Oct 1968, sunk as target 31 Jan 1969
Sterlet	SS-392	Portsmouth Naval Shipyard, Kittery, Maine	14 Jul 1943	27 Oct 1943	26 Aug 1950	30 Sep 1968	FS 1952, BQR-4 bow sonar 1955; struck 1 Oct 1968, sunk as target 31 Jan 1969
Queenfish	SS-393	Portsmouth Naval Shipyard, Kittery, Maine	27 Jul 1943	30 Nov 1943	11 Mar 1944	1 Mar 1963	AGSS 1 Jul 1960; struck 1 Mar 1963, sunk as target 14 Aug 1963
Razorback	SS-394	Portsmouth Naval Shipyard, Kittery, Maine	9 Sep 1943	27 Jan 1944	3 Apr 1944	August 1952	G IIA 1954; struck and sold to Turkey 30 Nov 1970 as Muratreis, decommissioned by Turkey 8 Aug 2001, memorial in North Little Rock, Arkansas
Razorback	SS-394	Portsmouth Naval Shipyard, Kittery, Maine	9 Sep 1943	27 Jan 1944	January 1954	30 Nov 1970	G IIA 1954; struck and sold to Turkey 30 Nov 1970 as Muratreis, decommissioned by Turkey 8 Aug 2001, memorial in North Little Rock, Arkansas
Redfish	SS-395	Portsmouth Naval Shipyard, Kittery, Maine	9 Sep 1943	27 Jan 1944	12 Apr 1944	27 Jun 1968	AGSS 1 Jul 1960; struck 30 Jun 1968, sunk as target 6 Feb 1969
Ronquil	SS-396	Portsmouth Naval Shipyard, Kittery, Maine	9 Sep 1943	27 Jan 1944	22 Apr 1944	1 May 1952	G IIA 1953; struck and transferred to Spain 1 Jul 1971 as Isaac Peral; struck by Spain 1982, fate unknown
Ronquil	SS-396	Portsmouth Naval Shipyard, Kittery, Maine	9 Sep 1943	27 Jan 1944	16 Jan 1953	1 Jul 1971	G IIA 1953; struck and transferred to Spain 1 Jul 1971 as Isaac Peral; struck by Spain 1982, fate unknown
Scabbardfish	SS-397	Portsmouth Naval Shipyard, Kittery, Maine	27 Sep 1943	27 Jan 1944	29 Apr 1944	5 Jan 1948	FS 1965; transferred to Greece 26 Feb 1965 as Triaina, struck and sold to Greece 31 Jan 1976; decommissioned by Greece 12 Jan 1979, but used for training until at least 1982, fate unknown
Scabbardfish	SS-397	Portsmouth Naval Shipyard, Kittery, Maine	27 Sep 1943	27 Jan 1944	24 Oct 1964	26 Feb 1965	FS 1965; transferred to Greece 26 Feb 1965 as Triaina, struck and sold to Greece 31 Jan 1976; decommissioned by Greece 12 Jan 1979, but used for training until at least 1982, fate unknown
Segundo	SS-398	Portsmouth Naval Shipyard, Kittery, Maine	14 Oct 1943	5 Feb 1944	9 May 1944	1 Aug 1970	FS 1951; struck 8 Aug 1970, sunk as target
Sea Cat	SS-399	Portsmouth Naval Shipyard, Kittery, Maine	30 Oct 1943	21 Feb 1944	16 May 1944	2 Dec 1968	AGSS 30 Sep 1949, SS 11 Dec 1951, FS 1952, AGSS 29 Jun 1968; struck 2 Dec 1968, test hulk 1968-1972, sold for scrap 18 May 1973
Sea Devil	SS-400	Portsmouth Naval Shipyard, Kittery, Maine	18 Nov 1943	28 Feb 1944	24 May 1944	9 Sep 1948	AGSS 1 Jul 1960; struck 1 Apr 1964, sunk as target 24 Nov 1964
Sea Devil	SS-400	Portsmouth Naval Shipyard, Kittery, Maine	18 Nov 1943	28 Feb 1944	3 Mar 1951	19 Feb 1954	AGSS 1 Jul 1960; struck 1 Apr 1964, sunk as target 24 Nov 1964
Sea Devil	SS-400	Portsmouth Naval Shipyard, Kittery, Maine	18 Nov 1943	28 Feb 1944	17 Aug 1957	17 Feb 1964	AGSS 1 Jul 1960; struck 1 Apr 1964, sunk as target 24 Nov 1964
Sea Dog	SS-401	Portsmouth Naval Shipyard, Kittery, Maine	1 Nov 1943	28 Mar 1944	3 Jun 1944	27 Jun 1956	AGSS 1 Dec 1962, PT 1960-1968; struck 2 Dec 1968, sold for scrap 2 Jan 1971, but sale cancelled and sunk as target 18 May 1973
Sea Dog	SS-401	Portsmouth Naval Shipyard, Kittery, Maine	1 Nov 1943	28 Mar 1944	February 1960	2 Dec 1968	AGSS 1 Dec 1962, PT 1960-1968; struck 2 Dec 1968, sold for scrap 2 Jan 1971, but sale cancelled and sunk as target 18 May 1973
Sea Fox	SS-402	Portsmouth Naval Shipyard, Kittery, Maine	2 Nov 1943	28 Mar 1944	13 Jun 1944	15 Oct 1952	G IIA 1953; struck and sold to Turkey 14 Dec 1970 as Burakreis, decommissioned by Turkey 1 Jul 1996, battery charging hulk until sold for scrap in 2003
Sea Fox	SS-402	Portsmouth Naval Shipyard, Kittery, Maine	2 Nov 1943	28 Mar 1944	5 Jun 1953	14 Dec 1970	G IIA 1953; struck and sold to Turkey 14 Dec 1970 as Burakreis, decommissioned by Turkey 1 Jul 1996, battery charging hulk until sold for scrap in 2003
Atule	SS-403	Portsmouth Naval Shipyard, Kittery, Maine	2 Dec 1943	6 Mar 1944	21 Jun 1944	8 Sep 1947	G IA 1951, AGSS 1 Oct 1969, SS 30 Jun 1971; struck 15 Aug 1973, sold to Peru 31 Jul 1974 as Pacocha; lost in a collision 26 Aug 1988, raised 23 Jul 1989, used for spare parts and presumably scrapped
Atule	SS-403	Portsmouth Naval Shipyard, Kittery, Maine	2 Dec 1943	6 Mar 1944	8 Mar 1951	6 Apr 1970	G IA 1951, AGSS 1 Oct 1969, SS 30 Jun 1971; struck 15 Aug 1973, sold to Peru 31 Jul 1974 as Pacocha; lost in a collision 26 Aug 1988, raised 23 Jul 1989, used for spare parts and presumably scrapped
Spikefish	SS-404	Portsmouth Naval Shipyard, Kittery, Maine	29 Jan 1944	26 Apr 1944	30 Jun 1944	2 Apr 1963	AGSS 1 Jul 1962; struck 1 May 1963, sunk as target 4 Aug 1964
Sea Owl	SS-405	Portsmouth Naval Shipyard, Kittery, Maine	7 Feb 1944	7 May 1944	17 Jul 1944	15 Nov 1969	FS 1951, BQR-4 bow sonar 1955, AGSS 30 Jun 1969; struck 15 Nov 1969, sold for scrap 3 Jun 1971
Sea Poacher	SS-406	Portsmouth Naval Shipyard, Kittery, Maine	23 Feb 1944	20 May 1944	31 Jul 1944	15 Nov 1969	G IA 1952, BQR-4 bow sonar 1955, AGSS 1 Nov 1969, SS 30 Jun 1971; struck 15 Aug 1973, sold to Peru 1 Jul 1974 as Pabellion de Pica (later La Pedrera), removed from service for pierside training 1995, fate unknown
Sea Robin	SS-407	Portsmouth Naval Shipyard, Kittery, Maine	1 Mar 1944	25 May 1944	7 Aug 1944	1 Oct 1970	G IA 1951; struck 1 Oct 1970, sold for scrap 3 Jun 1971
Sennet	SS-408	Portsmouth Naval Shipyard, Kittery, Maine	8 Mar 1944	6 Jun 1944	22 Aug 1944	2 Dec 1968	FS 1952; struck 2 Dec 1968, sold for scrap 15 Jun 1973
Piper	SS-409	Portsmouth Naval Shipyard, Kittery, Maine	15 Mar 1944	26 Jun 1944	23 Aug 1944	16 Jun 1967	FS 1951, BQR-4 bow sonar 1954, AGSS 15 Jun 1967, PT 1967-1970; struck 1 Jul 1970, sold for scrap June 1971
Threadfin	SS-410	Portsmouth Naval Shipyard, Kittery, Maine	18 Mar 1944	26 Jun 1944	30 Aug 1944	10 Dec 1952	G IIA 1953; transferred to Turkey 18 Aug 1972 as Birinci İnönü, struck 1 Aug 1973, sold to Turkey 18 Aug 1973; decommissioned by Turkey 11 Aug 1998, fate unknown
Threadfin	SS-410	Portsmouth Naval Shipyard, Kittery, Maine	18 Mar 1944	26 Jun 1944	7 Aug 1953	18 Aug 1972	G IIA 1953; transferred to Turkey 18 Aug 1972 as Birinci İnönü, struck 1 Aug 1973, sold to Turkey 18 Aug 1973; decommissioned by Turkey 11 Aug 1998, fate unknown
Spadefish	SS-411	Mare Island Naval Shipyard, Vallejo, California	27 May 1943	8 Jan 1944	9 Mar 1944	3 May 1946	AGSS 1 Dec 1962; struck 1 Apr 1967, sold for scrap 17 Oct 1969
Trepang	SS-412	Mare Island Naval Shipyard, Vallejo, California	25 Jun 1943	23 Mar 1944	22 May 1944	27 Jun 1946	PT 1960-1967, AGSS 1 Dec 1962; struck 30 Jun 1967, sunk as target 16 Sep 1969
Trepang	SS-412	Mare Island Naval Shipyard, Vallejo, California	25 Jun 1943	23 Mar 1944	February 1960	30 Jun 1967	PT 1960-1967, AGSS 1 Dec 1962; struck 30 Jun 1967, sunk as target 16 Sep 1969
Spot	SS-413	Mare Island Naval Shipyard, Vallejo, California	24 Aug 1943	19 May 1944	3 Aug 1944	19 Jun 1946	Transferred to Chile 12 Jan 1962 Simpson; struck and sold to Chile 1 Aug 1975, deleted by Chile 1982, fate unknown
Spot	SS-413	Mare Island Naval Shipyard, Vallejo, California	24 Aug 1943	19 May 1944	19 Aug 1961	12 Jan 1962	Transferred to Chile 12 Jan 1962 Simpson; struck and sold to Chile 1 Aug 1975, deleted by Chile 1982, fate unknown
Springer	SS-414	Mare Island Naval Shipyard, Vallejo, California	30 Oct 1943	3 Aug 1944	18 Oct 1944	26 Jun 1946	Transferred to Chile 23 Jan 1962 as Thomson; struck and sold to Chile 1 Sep 1972, deleted by Chile on unknown date, sold for scrap
Springer	SS-414	Mare Island Naval Shipyard, Vallejo, California	30 Oct 1943	3 Aug 1944	24 Sep 1960	23 Jan 1961	Transferred to Chile 23 Jan 1962 as Thomson; struck and sold to Chile 1 Sep 1972, deleted by Chile on unknown date, sold for scrap
Stickleback	SS-415	Mare Island Naval Shipyard, Vallejo, California	1 Mar 1944	1 Jan 1945	29 Mar 1945	26 Jun 1946	G IIA 1953; lost in a collision with USS Silverstein (DE-534) 28 May 1958
Stickleback	SS-415	Mare Island Naval Shipyard, Vallejo, California	1 Mar 1944	1 Jan 1945	6 Sep 1951	14 Nov 1952	G IIA 1953; lost in a collision with USS Silverstein (DE-534) 28 May 1958
Stickleback	SS-415	Mare Island Naval Shipyard, Vallejo, California	1 Mar 1944	1 Jan 1945	26 Jun 1953	—N/a	G IIA 1953; lost in a collision with USS Silverstein (DE-534) 28 May 1958
Tiru	SS-416	Mare Island Naval Shipyard, Vallejo, California	17 Apr 1944	16 Sep 1947	1 Sep 1948	1 Jul 1975	Completed as G II, prototype G III 1959; struck 1 Jul 1975, sunk as target 19 Jul 1979
Trumpetfish	SS-425	Cramp Shipbuilding Company, Philadelphia, Pennsylvania	23 Aug 1943	13 May 1945	29 Jan 1946	15 Oct 1973	G II 1948, G III 1962; struck and sold to Brazil 15 Oct 1973 as Goias, struck by Brazil 16 Apr 1990, fate unknown
Tusk	SS-426	Cramp Shipbuilding Company, Philadelphia, Pennsylvania	23 Aug 1943	8 Jul 1945	11 Apr 1946	18 Oct 1973	G II 1948; struck and sold to Taiwan 18 Oct 1973 as Hai Pao, still in service
Turbot	SS-427	Cramp Shipbuilding Company, Philadelphia, Pennsylvania	13 Nov 1943	12 Apr 1946	—N/a	—N/a	Cancelled and construction suspended 12 Aug 1945, launched incomplete, machinery test hulk at Annapolis, MD, sold for scrap 24 Mar 1993
Ulua	SS-428	Cramp Shipbuilding Company, Philadelphia, Pennsylvania	13 Nov 1943	23 Apr 1946	—N/a	—N/a	Cancelled and construction suspended 12 Aug 1945, launched incomplete, ordnance test hulk at Norfolk, VA 1951-1958; struck 12 Jun 1958, sold for scrap 30 Sep 1958
Unicorn	SS-429	Cramp Shipbuilding Company, Philadelphia, Pennsylvania	—N/a	—N/a	—N/a	—N/a	Cancelled 29 Jul 1944
Vendace	SS-430	Cramp Shipbuilding Company, Philadelphia, Pennsylvania	—N/a	—N/a	—N/a	—N/a	Cancelled 29 Jul 1944
Walrus	SS-431	Cramp Shipbuilding Company, Philadelphia, Pennsylvania	—N/a	—N/a	—N/a	—N/a	Cancelled 29 Jul 1944
Whitefish	SS-432	Cramp Shipbuilding Company, Philadelphia, Pennsylvania	—N/a	—N/a	—N/a	—N/a	Cancelled 29 Jul 1944
Whiting	SS-433	Cramp Shipbuilding Company, Philadelphia, Pennsylvania	—N/a	—N/a	—N/a	—N/a	Cancelled 29 Jul 1944
Wolffish	SS-434	Cramp Shipbuilding Company, Philadelphia, Pennsylvania	—N/a	—N/a	—N/a	—N/a	Cancelled 29 Jul 1944
—N/a	SS-438 – SS-457	Electric Boat Company, Groton, Connecticut	—N/a	—N/a	—N/a	—N/a	Cancelled 29 Jul 1944
—N/a	SS-458 – SS-463	Manitowoc Shipbuilding Company, Manitowoc, Wisconsin	—N/a	—N/a	—N/a	—N/a	Cancelled 29 Jul 1944
Chicolar	SS-464	Manitowoc Shipbuilding Company, Manitowoc, Wisconsin	—N/a	—N/a	—N/a	—N/a	Cancelled 29 Jul 1944
—N/a	SS-465 – SS-474	Manitowoc Shipbuilding Company, Manitowoc, Wisconsin	—N/a	—N/a	—N/a	—N/a	Cancelled 29 Jul 1944
—N/a	SS-530 – SS-536	Cramp Shipbuilding Company, Philadelphia, Pennsylvania	—N/a	—N/a	—N/a	—N/a	Cancelled 29 Jul 1944

== See also ==
- List of most successful American submarines in World War II
- List of lost United States submarines
- List of Gato-class submarines
- List of Tench-class submarines
