= TCG Çanakkale =

TCG Çanakkale is the name of the following submarines of the Turkish Navy:

- TCG Çanakkale (S 333), ex-USS Bumper, a Balao-class submarine acquired in 1950 and decommissioned in 1976
- TCG Çanakkale (S 341), ex-USS Cobbler, a Balao-class submarine acquired in 1974 and decommissioned in 1998
- TCG Çanakkale (S 358), a Type 209 submarine commissioned in 2004

== See also ==
- Çanakkale
