= USS Brill =

Submarine of the United States

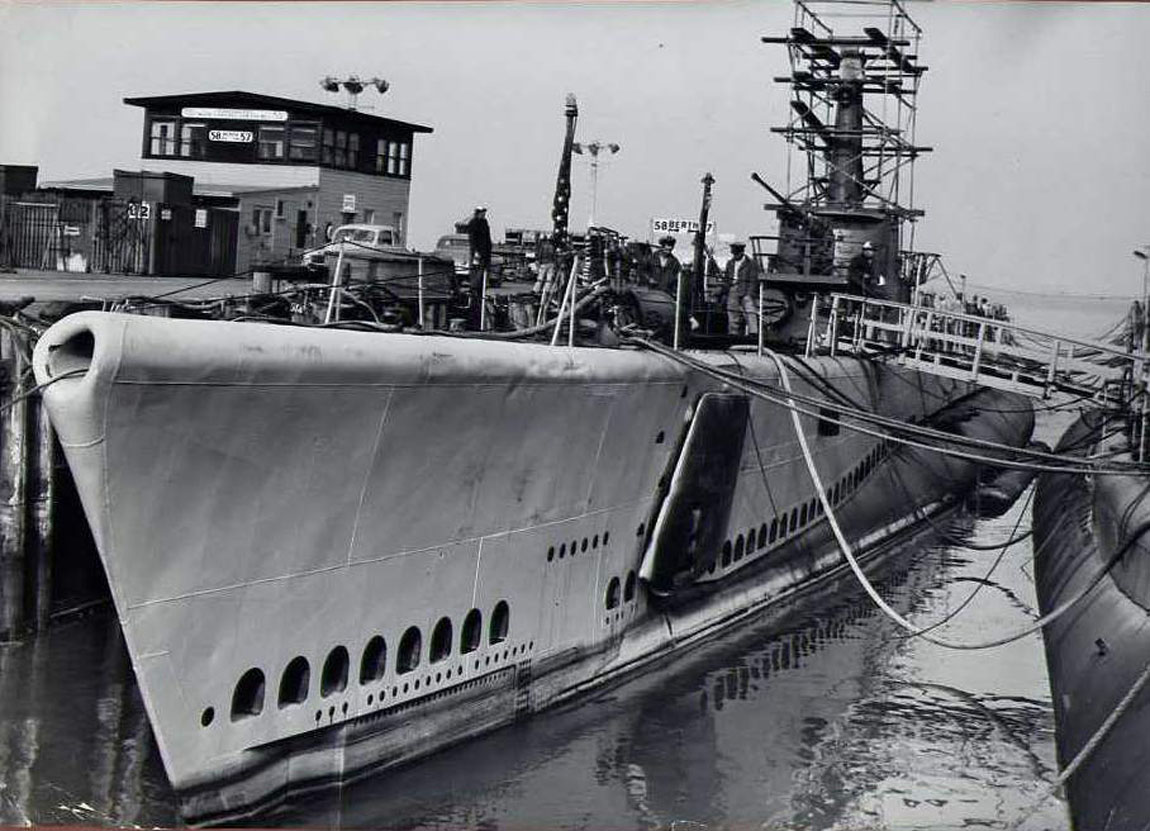
- USS Brill (SS-330) under refit at Hunters Point Naval Shipyard in San Francisco, California, in 1947.

History

United States
- Name: USS Brill (SS-330)
- Namesake: Brill, a European flatfish
- Builder: Electric Boat Company, Groton, Connecticut
- Laid down: 23 September 1943
- Launched: 25 June 1944
- Commissioned: 26 October 1944
- Decommissioned: 23 May 1948
- Stricken: 28 May 1948
- Fate: Transferred to Turkey 23 May 1948

Turkey
- Name: TCG Birinci İnönü (S 330), also written 1. İnönü
- Namesake: First Battle of İnönü, And İsmet İnönü
- Acquired: 23 May 1948
- Commissioned: 23 May 1948
- Decommissioned: 29 November 1972
- Fate: Sold for scrapping November 1980

General characteristics
- Class & type: Balao class diesel-electric submarine
- Displacement: 1,526 tons (1,550 t) surfaced; 2,424 tons (2,463 t) submerged
- Length: 311 ft 9 in (95.02 m)
- Beam: 27 ft 3 in (8.31 m)
- Draft: 16 ft 10 in (5.13 m) maximum
- Propulsion: 4 × General Motors Model 16-278A V16 diesel engines driving electrical generators; 2 × 126-cell Sargo batteries; 4 × high-speed General Electric electric motors with reduction gears; 2 × propellers; 5,400 shp (4.0 MW) surfaced; 2,740 shp (2.0 MW) submerged
- Speed: 20.25 knots (38 km/h) surfaced; 8.75 knots (16 km/h) submerged
- Range: 11,000 nautical miles (20,000 km) surfaced at 10 knots (19 km/h)
- Endurance: 48 hours at 2 knots (3.7 km/h) submerged; 75 days on patrol
- Test depth: 400 ft (120 m)
- Complement: 10 officers, 70–71 enlisted
- Armament: 10 × 21-inch (533 mm) torpedo tubes; 6 forward, 4 aft; 24 torpedoes; 1 × 5-inch (127 mm) / 25 caliber deck gun; Bofors 40 mm and Oerlikon 20 mm cannon

USS Brill (SS-330), a Balao-class submarine, was a ship of the United States Navy in commission from 1944 to 1947. She was named for the brill.

Brill was commissioned late in World War II, and her war operations extended from 28 January to 9 August 1945. She completed three war patrols in the South China Sea and the Gulf of Siam. Brill made few contacts worthy of torpedo fire and consequently had to settle for damaging an unidentified ship of approximately 1,000 gross register tons as her only score.

Decommissioned soon after World War II, Brill was transferred to Turkey. She served in the Turkish Navy as TCG Birinci İnönü (S330) from 1948 to 1972.

== Construction and commissioning ==
Brill was laid down on 23 September 1943 at Groton, Connecticut, by the Electric Boat Company. She was launched on 25 June 1944, sponsored by Mrs. Francis S. Low, wife of the admiral, and commissioned on 26 October 1944, with Commander Harry B. Dodge in command.

== Operational history ==
=== United States Navy ===
==== October 1944–February 1945 ====
Following shakedown training off New England, Brill got underway from New London, Connecticut, on 7 December 1944 bound for the Panama Canal. After transiting the canal, Brill took part in intensive training near the Pearl Islands in the Gulf of Panama between 17 and 21 December 1944. Then, on 23 December 1944, she departed the Submarine Base at Balboa in the Panama Canal Zone for Pearl Harbor, Hawaii, where she arrived on 8 January 1945.

Brill spent a week at Pearl Harbor undergoing voyage repairs and torpedo training before getting underway for the Mariana Islands on 28 January 1945. She conducted drills and battle problems en route and arrived at Saipan on 9 February 1945.

===== First war patrol =====
After refueling at Saipan, Brill began her first war patrol. Transiting the Luzon Strait on 15 February 1945 and arrived in her patrol area off Hainan Island in the South China Sea on 19 February. At first, she encountered no Japanese ships, but on 20 February 1945, just after Brill sank a floating naval mine with gunfire, her watchstanders saw a torpedo wake approaching on her starboard quarter. Brill took evasive action and the torpedo missed, then increased speed to avoid a second torpedo her lookouts sighted. Both torpedoes passed by her on her starboard side before she moved out of range, submerged, and headed hack to search in vain for what she assumed was a Japanese submarine that had attacked her.

The following days were uneventful, bringing Brill sightings of sailing junks, Allied aircraft, and some Japanese planes. On 1 March 1945, she made contact on three small Japanese patrol boats in shallow water, probably trying to trap an unsuspecting Allied submarine. Commander Dodge avoided the trap and continued to search for a worthwhile target. On 5 March 1945, he found one. While Brill patrolled submerged, Dodge sighted a large Japanese tanker escorted by two destroyers and a plane. Brill immediately attempted to move into position to attack the tanker, but gave up the effort an hour later when she could not close the range with it.

On 6 March 1945, Brill joined the submarine USS Chub (SS-329) in a coordinated patrol in the Tonkin Gulf. On 8 March 1945, Japanese planes forced them both to submerge and attacked them with depth charges, but neither submarine sustained damage. On 15 March 1945, while providing lifeguard services for American bombers attacking Hainan Island, Brill maneuvered to avoid another torpedo fired at her, presumably by a Japanese submarine. She again was unable to make contact with the attacking Japanese submarine.

On 21 March 1945, Brill rendezvoused with the submarine USS Gurnard (SS-254) to bring aboard an Australian Army officer and a native Malayan guide for a special mission on Sakala Island. Brill patrolled down the coast of Japanese-occupied French Indochina and arrived off Sakala Island on 25 March 1945. That night, the Australian commando and his partner went ashore. They returned to Brill an hour later with five Indonesians. When this entire party had embarked, Brill set course for Fremantle, Western Australia, where she completed her patrol with her arrival on 30 March 1945.

===== Second war patrol =====
Following a normal two-week refit and a short training period, Brill departed Fremantle on 27 April 1945 to begin her second war patrol, bound for a patrol area in waters off the eastern coast of Japanese-occupied British Malaya. She made no ship contacts worthy of torpedoes and, on 4 June 1945, left her patrol area. She terminated her patrol at Subic Bay on Luzon in the Philippines, where she underwent a refit alongside the submarine tender USS Howard W. Gilmore (AS-16).

===== Third war patrol =====
On 3 July 1945, Brill stood out to sea for her third war patrol. She arrived in her patrol area in the Gulf of Siam on 8 July 1945 and joined other American submarines in patrolling those waters. She encountered two small Japanese patrol vessels on 11 July 1945 and commenced a surface approach for an attack. Although she fired 11 torpedoes, only one scored a hit, the others presumably passing under the hulls of the shallow-draft ships. By this time, Brill was inside the 10-fathom (60 ft; 18 m) curve and the onset of darkness ruled out using her deck guns to sink the patrol vessels, so she broke off the attack.

Another opportunity presented itself on 19 July 1945, when Brill encountered a small Japanese convoy of two merchant ships, a destroyer, and two patrol boats. she fired four torpedoes, but scored no hits. She broke off the attack at dawn and departed the area. She made no worthwhile contacts during the remainder of the patrol. On 1 August 1945, she rendezvoused with Chub to transfer her remaining 5-inch (127 mm) gun ammunition to Chub, then set course for Fremantle, where she arrived on 9 August 1945 and began a refit alongside the submarine tender USS Clytie (AS-26). Hostilities with Japan ended on 15 August 1945 while she still undergoing refit.

===== Post-World War II =====
On 31 August 1945 Brill departed Fremantle with Chub and the submarines USS Bumper (SS-333) and USS Bugara (SS-331) bound for Subic Bay, which she reached on 9 September 1945. There, she served as a unit of Submarines, Philippine Sea Frontier, until January 1946, when she received orders to Pearl Harbor for repairs to her diesel engines. After calling at Pearl Harbor, she got back underway on 5 February 1946 with only three of her four engines in operation, heading east to San Diego, California, for a period of shore leave and upkeep. She reached San Diego on 12 February 1946 and went alongside the submarine tender USS Sperry (AS-12) for repairs.

After a week of refresher training, Brill departed San Diego on 23 April 1946 to return to Pearl Harbor, where she commenced an overhaul on 1 May 1946. At the conclusion of the overhaul, she resumed operations with the United States Pacific Fleet. Departing Pearl Harbor on 12 September 1946, Brill made a two-month cruise to Midway Atoll in the Northwestern Hawaiian Islands, Adak in the Aleutian Islands, Kodiak on Kodiak Island, and Indian Island in Puget Sound in Washington. She returned to Pearl Harbor on 9 November 1946.

Brill resumed training exercises around Hawaii with Submarine Squadron 5. During the summer of 1947, she put to sea in company with the submarines USS Bergall (SS-320) and USS Bugara (SS-331) for a coordinated attack exercise against the battleship USS Iowa (BB-61) in the Hawaiian Islands. Taking up a position in the Alenuihaha Channel, the submarines attempted to intercept the battleship as she made a high-speed run between Maui and the island of Hawaii. Although Iowa enjoyed land-based air cover and tried to throw off her pursuers by several radical course changes, the submarines still achieved four "successful" mock attacks against the battleship.

Brill again resumed training exercises in Hawaiian waters with Submarine Squadron 5 until 4 September 1947, when she departed Pearl Harbor for San Diego. She commenced overhaul at Hunters Point Naval Shipyard in San Francisco, California, on 29 September 1947. Leaving the shipyard early in 1948, she completed refresher training and departed on 24 February 1948 for Naval Submarine Base New London in Groton, Connecticut, where she arrived on 16 March 1948. She was decommissioned there on 23 May 1948 and struck from the Naval Vessel Register on 28 May 1948.

==== Honors and awards ====
- Asiatic-Pacific Campaign Medal with one battle star for World War II service

=== Turkish Navy ===
Brill was turned over to Turkey on 23 May 1948 and was commissioned in the Turkish Navy the same day as TCG Birinci İnönü (S330) ("First Inonu"), also written as 1. İnönü, the second submarine of that name. She was named in commemoration of the Turkish victory at the First Battle of İnönü in January 1921.

In 1952–1953 Birinci İnönü was converted into a GUPPY Fleet Snorkel submarine. The interior work was done at Turkey's Gölcük Naval Yard, then the conversion was completed in the United States.

Birinci İnönü was decommissioned on 29 November 1972. She was sold to Stavros Vamvounakis of Athens, Greece, in November 1980 for scrapping.
