= USS Entemedor =

Submarine of the United States

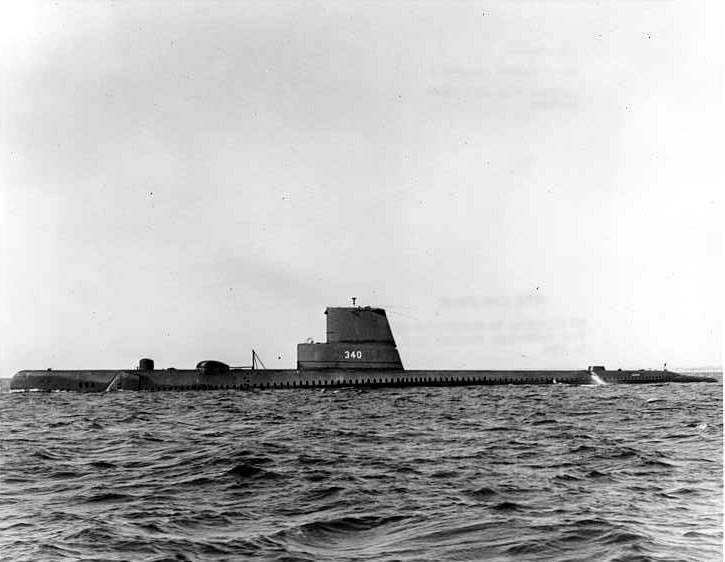
- Entemedor (SS-340), underway in 1956.

History

United States
- Name: Entemedor
- Builder: Electric Boat Company, Groton, Connecticut
- Laid down: 3 February 1944
- Launched: 17 December 1944
- Commissioned: 6 April 1945
- Decommissioned: 10 December 1948
- Recommissioned: 24 October 1950
- Decommissioned: 31 July 1972
- Stricken: 1 August 1973
- Identification: Hull number: SS-340
- Fate: Transferred to Turkey on 31 July or 24 August 1972; Sold to Turkey on 1 August 1973

Turkey
- Name: TCG Preveze
- Acquired: 31 July or 24 August 1972
- Decommissioned: 1987
- Stricken: 1987
- Identification: Hull number: S 345

General characteristics
- Class & type: Balao class diesel-electric submarine
- Displacement: 1,526 tons (1,550 t) surfaced, 2,424 tons (2,463 t) submerged
- Length: 311 ft 9 in (95.02 m)
- Beam: 27 ft 3 in (8.31 m)
- Draft: 16 ft 10 in (5.13 m) maximum
- Propulsion: 4 × General Motors Model 16-278A V16 diesel engines driving electrical generators; 2 × 126-cell Sargo batteries; 4 × high-speed General Electric electric motors with reduction gears; 2 × propellers; 5,400 shp (4.0 MW) surfaced; 2,740 shp (2.0 MW) submerged
- Speed: 20.25 kn (37.50 km/h) surfaced, 8.75 kn (16.21 km/h) submerged
- Range: 11,000 nmi (20,000 km) surfaced @ 10 kn (19 km/h) surfaced
- Endurance: 48 hours @ 2 kn (3.7 km/h) submerged, 75 days on patrol
- Test depth: 400 ft (120 m)
- Complement: 10 officers, 70–71 enlisted
- Armament: 10 × 21-inch (533 mm) torpedo tubes; 6 forward, 4 aft; 24 torpedoes; 1 × 5-inch (127 mm) / 25 caliber deck gun; Bofors 40 mm and Oerlikon 20 mm cannon

USS Entemedor (SS-340), a Balao-class submarine, was a ship of the United States Navy named for the entemedor, a fish of the electric ray family found in shallow waters from Baja California to Panama.

== Construction and commissioning ==
SS-340, originally named Chickwick, was renamed Entemedor on 24 September 1942 and launched on 17 December 1944 by the Electric Boat Company, Groton, Connecticut, sponsored by Mrs. E. V. Izac; and commissioned on 6 April 1945.

== Service history ==
=== United States Navy ===
==== World War II ====
Entemedor reached Pearl Harbor on 29 June 1945 from New London, en route to Midway Atoll for advanced training and to prepare for war patrols. She put to sea on her first war patrol on 24 July, and served as lifeguard for air strikes on Marcus Island before sailing on to patrol off Japan. When hostilities ceased, she was ordered to Saipan, where she arrived 17 August.

==== Post-war ====
The submarine returned to Seattle on 22 September 1945, and began a program of training operations along the west coast from San Diego. In 1946–1947, she made extended cruises in the Far East, basing at Subic Bay. She was decommissioned and placed in reserve at Mare Island Naval Shipyard on 10 December 1948.

Recommissioned on 24 October 1950, Entemedor trained off the coast of California, and on 2 January 1951 sailed for New London and through the remainder of the year operated in the Atlantic. On 31 January 1952, she entered the Electric Boat Co.'s yard for an extensive GUPPY IIA modernization, was placed in commission in reserve on 28 February 1952, and returned to active status 17 October 1952.

Every second year beginning in 1953, Entemedor deployed to the Mediterranean to serve with the 6th Fleet, and from her home port at New London also sailed for a midshipman cruise to northern European ports in the summer of 1958, and the Isle of Portland, England, in February 1960.

Her stateside operations included participation in large-scale exercises off the east coast and in the Caribbean, and serving as target for Task Force "Alfa", in development of antisubmarine warfare techniques. Through 1962 she continued to operate from New London. Entemedor was decommissioned and struck from the Naval Vessel Register on 31 July 1972.

=== Turkish Navy ===
Entemedor was transferred to Turkey under the terms of the Security Assistance Act on 24 August 1972 and renamed TCG Preveze (S 345), the second Turkish Navy submarine of that name. She was sold to Turkey on 1 August 1973. She was decommissioned and struck from the rolls of the Turkish Navy in 1987.

== Awards ==
- Asiatic-Pacific Campaign Medal
- World War II Victory Medal
- Navy Occupation Service Medal with "ASIA" and "EUROPE" clasps
- National Defense Service Medal with star

== Miscellaneous ==
A bronze plaque from the ship was purchased by contestants in an episode of the British TV show Bargain Hunt for £20, then sold at auction for £35.
