= USS Bumper =

Submarine of the United States

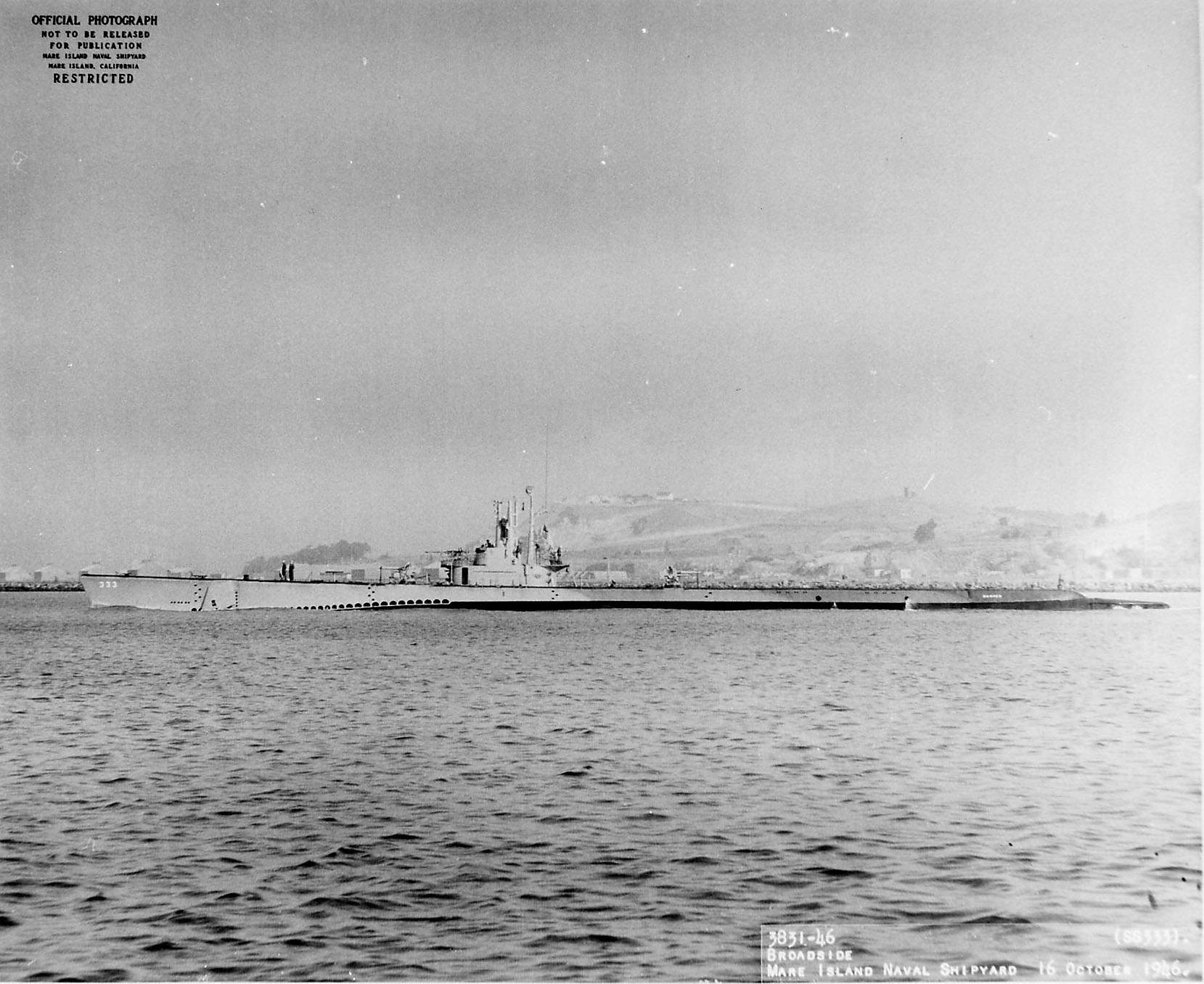

History

United States
- Name: USS Bumper (SS-333)
- Builder: Electric Boat Company, Groton, Connecticut
- Laid down: 4 November 1943
- Launched: 6 August 1944
- Commissioned: 9 December 1944
- Decommissioned: 16 November 1950
- Stricken: 20 December 1950
- Fate: Transferred to Turkey, 16 November 1950

Turkey
- Name: TCG Çanakkale (S 333)
- Acquired: 16 November 1950
- Commissioned: 16 November 1950
- Decommissioned: 11 August 1976

General characteristics
- Class & type: Balao class diesel-electric submarine
- Displacement: 1,526 tons (1,550 t) surfaced; 2,424 tons (2,463 t) submerged
- Length: 311 ft 9 in (95.02 m)
- Beam: 27 ft 3 in (8.31 m)
- Draft: 16 ft 10 in (5.13 m) maximum
- Propulsion: 4 × General Motors Model 16-278A V16 diesel engines driving electrical generators; 2 × 126-cell Sargo batteries; 4 × high-speed General Electric electric motors with reduction gears; 2 × propellers; 5,400 shp (4.0 MW) surfaced; 2,740 shp (2.0 MW) submerged
- Speed: 20.25 knots (38 km/h) surfaced; 8.75 knots (16 km/h) submerged
- Range: 11,000 nautical miles (20,000 km) surfaced at 10 knots (19 km/h)
- Endurance: 48 hours at 2 knots (3.7 km/h) submerged; 75 days on patrol
- Test depth: 400 ft (120 m)
- Complement: 10 officers, 70–71 enlisted
- Armament: 10 × 21-inch (533 mm) torpedo tubes; 6 forward, 4 aft; 24 torpedoes; 1 × 5-inch (127 mm) / 25 caliber deck gun; Bofors 40 mm and Oerlikon 20 mm cannon

USS Bumper (SS-333), a Balao-class submarine, was a ship of the United States Navy named for the bumper, a small fish of the North and South Atlantic Ocean.

Between 22 April and 15 August 1945 Bumper completed two war patrols in the Java Sea, South China Sea, and Gulf of Siam. During this time she sank a 1,189-gross register ton tanker at sea, sank another small tanker at anchor, and sank four miscellaneous small craft by gunfire.

She served in the Turkish Navy as TCG Çanakkale (S 333) from 1950 to 1976.

== Construction and commissioning ==
Bumper was laid down on 4 November 1943 by the Electric Boat Company, at Groton, Connecticut. She was launched on 6 August 1944, sponsored by Mrs. Margaret Williams (née Smith), wife of Bumper's prospective commanding officer, and commissioned on 9 December 1944 with Commander Joseph W. Williams, Jr., in command.

== United States Navy ==
=== December 1944–May 1945 ===
Following her commissioning, Bumper conducted her shakedown training off the New England coast, and then reported to Key West, Florida, for training at the Sound School. Soon after her arrival at Key West, the crew discovered corrosion in the main hydraulic system which forced Bumper to return to the Electric Boat Company for repairs. On 19 February 1945, Bumper once again got underway for Florida and the Panama Canal Zone. After two weeks of advanced exercises in submarine warfare, Bumper left the Panama Canal Zone on 15 March 1945 to report to the United States Pacific Fleet at Pearl Harbor, Hawaii, where she spent three weeks preparing herself in Pacific Fleet procedures.

=== First war patrol ===
Bumper departed Pearl Harbor on 22 April 1945 to begin her first war patrol. After refueling at Saipan in the Mariana Islands on 4 May 1945, she proceeded to her patrol area in the South China Sea. Although she searched for Japanese ships, her primary mission was lifeguard duty off Formosa and Hainan Island in support of Allied airstrikes there. On 6 June 1945, the submarine USS Bugara (SS-331) relieved Bumper, which made for Subic Bay on Luzon in the Philippine Islands. While en route to Subic Bay, she received orders to relieve the submarine USS Icefish (SS-367) to allow Icefish to return to port with some injured aviators. Bumper rode out a small typhoon before the submarine USS Carbonero (SS-337) relieved her. Bumper then proceeded to Subic Bay for a refit alongside the submarine tender USS Anthedon (AS-24).

=== Second war patrol ===
Bumper stood out of Subic Bay on 10 July 1945 to begin her second war patrol, this time assigned a patrol area in the Gulf of Siam near Singapore. There, she sighted and pursued a Japanese convoy of two small tankers and a cargo ship screened by a destroyer and several smaller escorts. However, Bumper′s initial attacks on the convoy were unsuccessful, as were those of Bugara and the submarine USS Brill (SS-330). On 15 July 1945, a Japanese schooner sailing south along the coast came into Bumper′s sights, and she sank it with gunfire. On 17 July 1945, she sank a Japanese coastal cargo ship with gunfire, and the entire incident was recorded on film.

Bumper also continued to dog the track of the convoy. After pursuing it for over two weeks, she had another chance to attack it on 20 July 1945. She fired her last three torpedoes at one of the small tankers and sank Kyoei Maru along with her cargo of oil. Bumper then submerged to give her crew a brief rest before heading for Subic Bay to reload torpedoes. Following reloading, she patrolled off Singapore and in the Java Sea. During the morning of 5 August 1945, she sighted and sank with gunfire a tug, a barge, and later a small sailing vessel.

Claiming to have sent some 2,500 gross register tons of shipping to the bottom, Bumper made for Fremantle, Australia, where she arrived on 15 August 1945. Just an hour after her arrival, hostilities with Japan ended, bringing World War II to an end.

=== Post-World War II ===
Following a refit alongside the submarine tender USS Clytie (AS-26), Bumper got underway from Fremantle on 31 August 1945 along with Brill, Bugara, and the submarine USS Chub (SS-329) bound for Subic Bay, where she arrived on 9 September 1945. She served as a unit of Submarines, Philippine Sea Frontier, devoting herself mainly to training missions.

Bumper departed Subic Bay on 7 January 1946 and proceeded to San Diego, California, where she arrived on 4 February 1946 and began repairs. Repairs completed, she spent April 1946 in intensive training, and on 6 May 1946 she headed for her new home port, Pearl Harbor, and reported for duty there with Submarine Squadron 5. After two more months of training, Bumper′s crew, although cut to 75 percent of authorized strength and with a few United States Naval Reserve personnel remaining, was deemed ready for duty. Until the end of July, Bumper operated in routine exercises in the waters of the Hawaiian Islands in a stepped-down post-World War II environment. After overhaul at Mare Island Naval Shipyard at Vallejo, California, from August through October 1946, she returned to Pearl Harbor, where she participated in training exercises in Hawaiian waters with other squadrons.

On 16 December 1946, Bumper departed Pearl Harbor to conduct a simulated war patrol. She called at Truk Atoll in the Caroline Islands, Guam in the Mariana Islands, Subic Bay, Yokosuka in Japan, and Midway Atoll in the Northwestern Hawaiian Islands. She also spent six weeks with Northern Training Group, Western Pacific, at Tsingtao, China, and in the Yellow Sea. She returned to Pearl Harbor on 29 March 1947.

After two weeks of upkeep, Bumper resumed local operations in Hawaiian waters. In April 1947 she was assigned to drill Task Force 38 in antisubmarine warfare. A coordinated attack group composed of Bumper, Chub, and the submarines USS Blackfin (SS-322) and USS Tilefish (SS-307) made practice attacks on the task force, approaching the surface ships silently and submerged to stay undetected for as long as possible. Similar drills took place in May 1947 and continued through the end of the year.

Early in January 1948 Bumper proceeded to San Diego, where she arrived on 12 January and began work with the Sound School on a variety of sonar research projects. In February 1948 she carried out a two-week Naval Reserve training cruise before beginning a three-month overhaul at the Mare Island Naval Shipyard. On 12 June 1948, she arrived at Pearl Harbor and resume her usual operational schedule in Hawaiian waters. She made a second simulated war patrol, conducting antisubmarine warfare drills with the seaplane tender USS Salisbury Sound (AV-13) while making port visits to Hong Kong, Okinawa, Sasebo in Japan, Tsingtao, and Midway Atoll. She returned to Pearl Harbor on 29 September 1948 and spent the rest of the year in local training operations with Submarine Squadron 5.

Bumper operated from Pearl Harbor until 7 February 1950, when she got underway bound for the United States East Coast. She transited the Panama Canal on 22 February 1950 and operated along the U.S. East Coast until entering the Philadelphia Naval Shipyard at League Island in Philadelphia, Pennsylvania, for a modernization overhaul. On 16 September 1950, she reported to New London to take on Turkish sailors for training. She was decommissioned on 16 November 1950, and her name was struck from the Navy list on 20 December 1950.

=== Honors and awards ===
- Asiatic-Pacific Campaign Medal with one battle star for World War II service
- Navy Occupation Service Medal with "ASIA" clasp
- China Service Medal

== Turkish Navy ==
The submarine was transferred to Turkey on 16 November 1950 under the terms of the Mutual Defense Assistance Program and commissioned that day in the Turkish Navy as TCG Çanakkale (S 333). She served in the Turkish Navy until she was decommissioned 11 August 1976.
