= USS Ulua =

Submarine of the United States

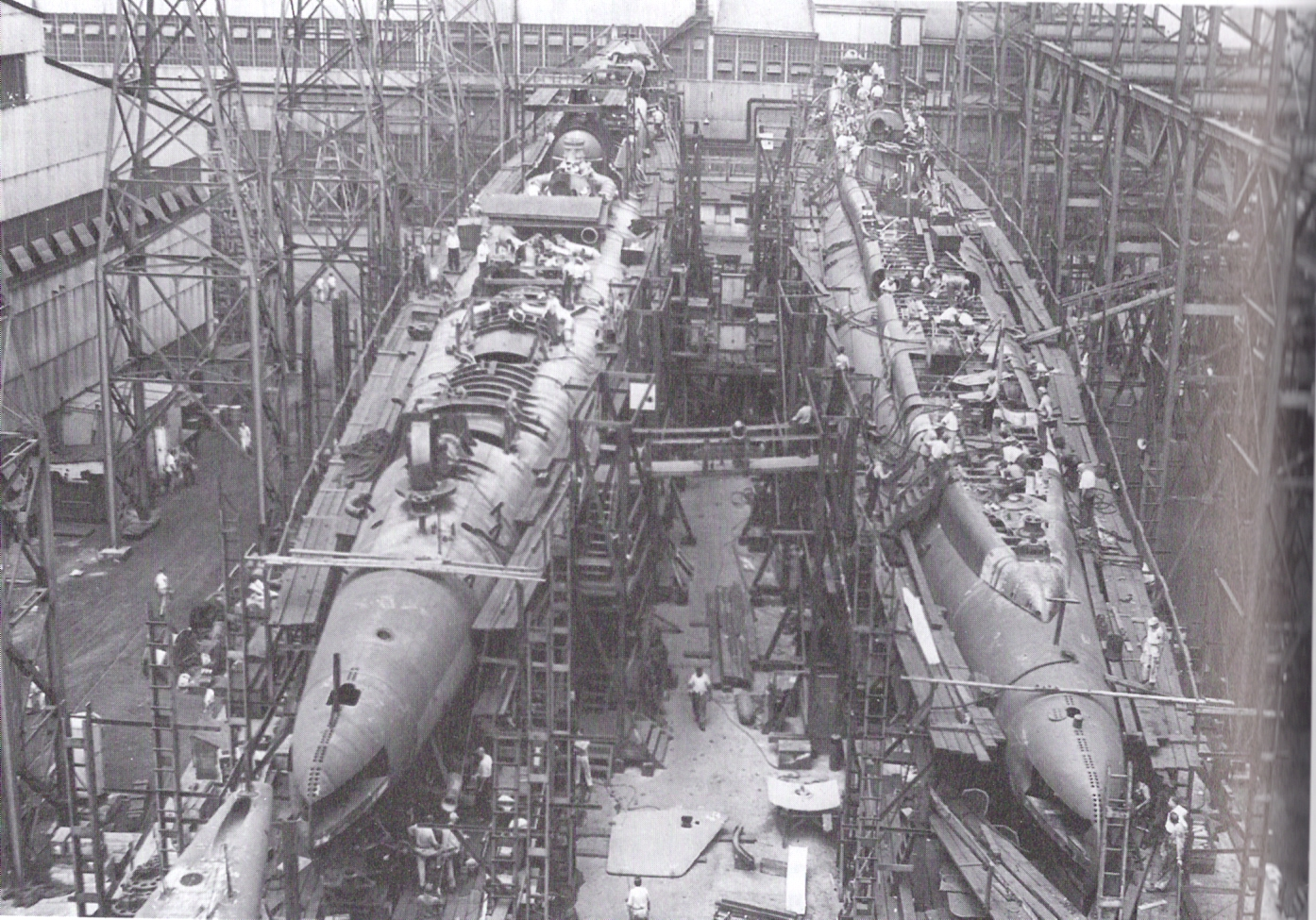
- Ulua (left) and Trumpetfish (right) under construction at the Cramp Shipbuilding Company, Philadelphia, on 2 July 1945.

History

United States
- Name: Ulua
- Namesake: The ulua, a tropical Pacific food fish
- Builder: Cramp Shipbuilding Company, Philadelphia, Pennsylvania
- Laid down: 13 November 1943
- Launched: 23 April 1946
- Completed: Never
- Commissioned: Never
- Stricken: 12 June 1958
- Fate: Construction contract cancelled 12 August 1945
- Notes: Served as testing hulk 1951–1958

General characteristics
- Class & type: Balao-class diesel-electric submarine
- Displacement: 1,526 long tons (1,550 t) surfaced, 2,414 long tons (2,453 t) submerged
- Length: 311 ft 9 in (95.02 m)
- Beam: 27 ft 3 in (8.31 m)
- Draft: 16 ft 10 in (5.13 m) maximum
- Propulsion: 4 × General Motors Model 16-248 V16 Diesel engines driving electric generators; 2 × 126-cell Sargo batteries; 4 × high-speed General Electric electric motors with reduction gears; two propellers; 5,400 shp (4.0 MW) surfaced; 2,740 shp (2.0 MW) submerged
- Speed: 20.25 kn (37.50 km/h) surfaced, 8.75 kn (16.21 km/h) submerged
- Range: 11,000 nmi (20,000 km) surfaced @ 10 kn (19 km/h)
- Endurance: 48 hours @ 2 kn (3.7 km/h) submerged, 75 days on patrol
- Test depth: 400 ft (120 m)
- Complement: 10 officers, 70–71 enlisted
- Armament: 10 × 21-inch (533 mm) torpedo tubes; 6 forward, 4 aft; 24 torpedoes; 1 × 4-inch (102 mm) / 50 caliber deck gun; Bofors 40 mm and Oerlikon 20 mm cannon

USS Ulua (SS-428), a Balao-class submarine, was the only ship of the United States Navy named for the ulua. She was never completed.

Ulua's keel was laid down on 13 November 1943 at Philadelphia by the Cramp Shipbuilding Company, but the curtailment of U.S. Navy construction programs in the closing days of World War II resulted in the suspension of further construction on 12 August 1945.

The partly completed submarine was launched on 23 April 1946 and towed to the Portsmouth Naval Shipyard in Kittery, Maine, for maintenance prior to beginning her career as a test hull. Towed to Norfolk, Virginia, in 1951, she participated in tests to gather research data on new weapon and submarine design. Ulua was stricken from the Naval Vessel Register list on 12 June 1958. Her hulk was sold for scrap on 30 September 1958 to the Portsmouth Salvage Company, Inc.
