= USS Dragonet =

Submarine of the United States

Coordinates: 47°57′N 153°08′E

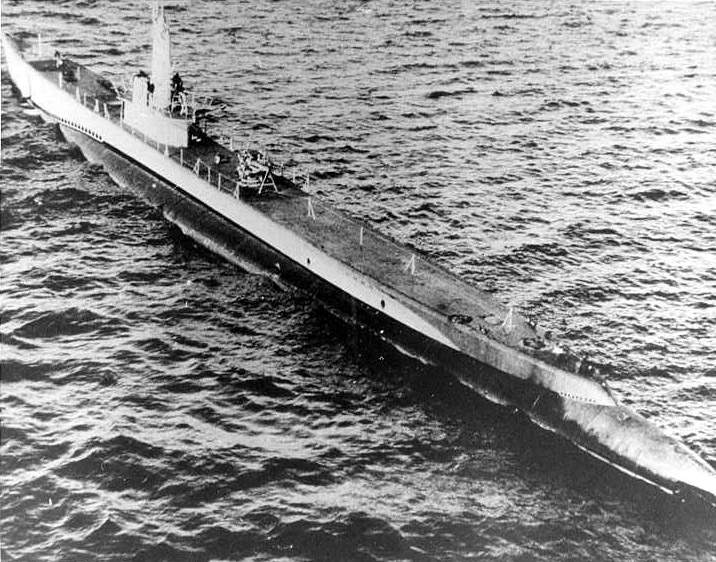
- Dragonet (SS-293)

History

United States
- Name: Dragonet
- Builder: Cramp Shipbuilding Co., Philadelphia
- Yard number: 548
- Laid down: 28 April 1942
- Launched: 18 April 1943
- Commissioned: 6 March 1944
- Decommissioned: 16 April 1946
- Stricken: 1 June 1961
- Fate: Scuttled in the Chesapeake Bay after tests, 17 September 1961

General characteristics
- Class & type: Balao class diesel-electric submarine
- Displacement: 1,526 tons (1,550 t) surfaced; 2,424 tons (2,463 t) submerged
- Length: 311 ft 8 in (95.00 m)
- Beam: 27 ft 3 in (8.31 m)
- Draft: 16 ft 10 in (5.13 m) maximum
- Propulsion: 4 × Fairbanks-Morse Model 38D8-1/8 9-cylinder opposed-piston diesel engines driving electrical generators; 2 × 126-cell Sargo batteries; 4 × high-speed Elliott electric motors with reduction gears; 2 × propellers; 5,400 shp (4.0 MW) surfaced; 2,740 shp (2.04 MW) submerged
- Speed: 20.25 knots (38 km/h) surfaced; 8.75 knots (16 km/h) submerged
- Range: 11,000 nautical miles (20,000 km) surfaced at 10 knots (19 km/h)
- Endurance: 48 hours at 2 knots (3.7 km/h) submerged; 75 days on patrol
- Test depth: 400 ft (120 m)
- Complement: 10 officers, 70–71 enlisted
- Armament: 10 × 21-inch (533 mm) torpedo tubes; 6 forward, 4 aft; 24 torpedoes; 1 × 5-inch (127 mm) / 25 caliber deck gun; Bofors 40 mm and Oerlikon 20 mm cannon

USS Dragonet (SS-293), a Balao-class submarine, was a ship of the United States Navy named for the dragonet.

== History ==
Dragonet (SS-293) was launched 18 April 1943 by Cramp Shipbuilding Co., Philadelphia; sponsored by Mrs. J. E. Gingrich; and commissioned 6 March 1944.

Dragonet was depth charged during a series of controlled tests in April, May and June 1944 off Portsmouth, New Hampshire.

Dragonet reached Pearl Harbor from New London 9 October 1944, and put out on her first war patrol 1 November, bound for the Kurile Islands and the Sea of Okhotsk. On the morning of 15 December 1944, while submerged south of Matsuwa, Dragonet struck an uncharted submerged pinnacle, which holed her pressure hull in the forward torpedo room. The space was completely flooded, and in order to surface the submarine, it was necessary to blow water out of the compartment with compressed air. At 0845 she surfaced, just 4 miles (6.4 km) from the airfield on Matsuwa, and set course to clear the danger area as quickly as possible. Her bow planes were rigged out, and in order to rerig them, it would be necessary to enter the flooded compartment. Next day this was accomplished by putting pressure in the forward battery compartment, and opening the water-tight door into the forward torpedo room. The determination and skill of her crew were further tried when she had to run through two days of storm to reach Midway 20 December for emergency repairs.

After overhaul at Mare Island Naval Shipyard, Vallejo, CA., Dragonet returned to Pearl Harbor 2 April 1945, and sailed on her next patrol 19 April. She called at Guam to refuel from 1 to 3 May, then proceeded to lifeguard duty south of the Japanese home islands. She rescued four downed Army aviators during this patrol, and returned to refit at Guam between 10 June and 8 July.

Dragonet's third war patrol, between 8 July 1945 and 17 August, was a combination of lifeguard duty and offensive against Japanese shipping in Bungo Suido. At this late stage in the war, the remnants of the Japanese merchant marine provided few targets, and none was contacted by Dragonet. She rescued a downed naval aviator near Okino Shima. Putting into Saipan at the close of the war, she sailed on to Pearl Harbor and San Francisco.

=== Post World War II ===
Dragonet was decommissioned and placed in reserve at Mare Island 16 April 1946, and laid up in the Pacific Reserve Fleet at Pearl Harbor. Early in 1961, she was towed from Pearl Harbor to Norfolk, Virginia by the fleet tug USS Takelma (ATF-113) prior to her disposal. She was struck from the Naval Register 1 June 1961, and sunk by explosive test in the Chesapeake Bay.

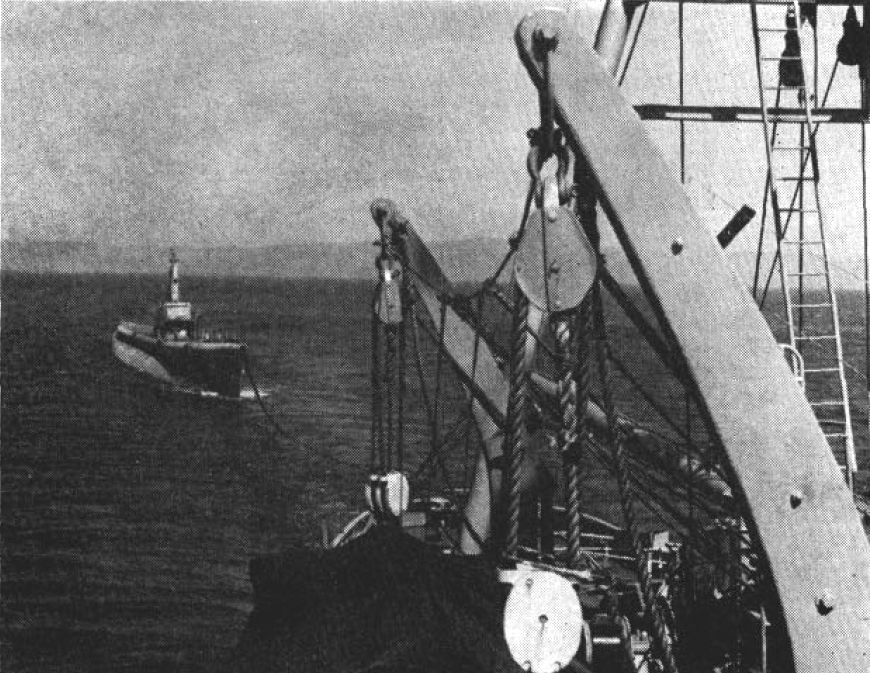
Dragonet being towed to Norfolk in 1961.

== Awards ==
Dragonet's second and third war patrols were designated as "successful". She received two battle stars for World War II service.
