= USS Trumpetfish =

Submarine of the United States

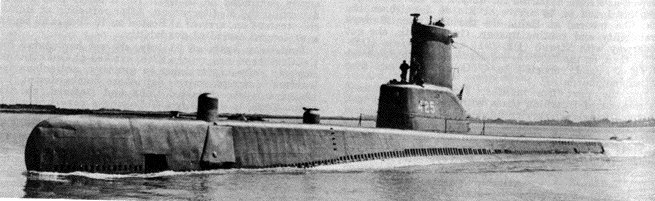
- USS Trumpetfish after Greater Underwater Propulsive Power Program (GUPPY) conversion.

History

United States
- Name: USS Trumpetfish (SS-425)
- Builder: Cramp Shipbuilding Company, Philadelphia
- Yard number: 559
- Laid down: 23 August 1943
- Launched: 13 May 1945
- Commissioned: 29 January 1946
- Decommissioned: 15 October 1973
- Stricken: 15 October 1973
- Fate: Transferred to Brazil, 15 October 1973

Brazil
- Name: Goias (S-15)
- Acquired: 15 October 1973
- Stricken: 16 April 1990

General characteristics (As completed)
- Class & type: Balao-class diesel-electric submarine
- Displacement: 1,526 long tons (1,550 t) surfaced; 2,424 long tons (2,463 t) submerged
- Length: 311 ft 9 in (95.02 m)
- Beam: 27 ft 3 in (8.31 m)
- Draft: 16 ft 10 in (5.13 m) maximum
- Propulsion: 4 × Fairbanks-Morse Model 38D8-⅛ 10-cylinder opposed piston diesel engines driving electrical generators; 2 × 126-cell Sargo batteries; 2 × low-speed direct-drive Elliott electric motors; two propellers; 5,400 shp (4.0 MW) surfaced; 2,740 shp (2.0 MW) submerged
- Speed: 20.25 knots (37.50 km/h) surfaced; 8.75 knots (16.21 km/h) submerged
- Range: 11,000 nautical miles (20,000 km) surfaced at 10 knots (19 km/h)
- Endurance: 48 hours at 2 knots (3.7 km/h) submerged; 75 days on patrol
- Test depth: 400 feet (120 m)
- Complement: 10 officers, 70–71 enlisted
- Armament: 10 × 21-inch (533 mm) torpedo tubes; 6 forward, 4 aft; 24 torpedoes; 1 × 5-inch (127 mm) / 25 caliber deck gun; Bofors 40 mm and Oerlikon 20 mm cannon

General characteristics (Guppy II)
- Displacement: 1,870 long tons (1,900 t) surfaced; 2,440 long tons (2,480 t) submerged
- Length: 307 ft (94 m)
- Beam: 27 ft 4 in (8.33 m)
- Draft: 17 ft (5.2 m)
- Propulsion: Snorkel added; Batteries upgraded to GUPPY type, capacity expanded to 504 cells (1 × 184 cell, 1 × 68 cell, and 2 × 126 cell batteries)
- Speed: Surfaced: 18.0 knots (33.3 km/h) maximum; 13.5 knots (25.0 km/h) cruising; Submerged: 16.0 knots (29.6 km/h) for ½ hour; 9.0 knots (16.7 km/h) snorkeling; 3.5 knots (6.5 km/h) cruising
- Range: 15,000 nautical miles (28,000 km) surfaced at 11 knots (20 km/h)
- Endurance: 48 hours at 4 knots (7.4 km/h) submerged
- Complement: 9–10 officers; 5 petty officers; 70 enlisted men
- Sensors & processing systems: WFA active sonar; JT passive sonar; Mk 106 torpedo fire control system
- Armament: 10 × 21 inch (533 mm) torpedo tubes; (six forward, four aft); all guns removed

General characteristics (Guppy III)
- Displacement: 1,975 long tons (2,007 t) surfaced; 2,450 long tons (2,490 t) submerged
- Length: 321 ft (98 m)
- Beam: 27 ft 4 in (8.33 m)
- Draft: 17 ft (5.2 m)
- Speed: Surfaced: 17.2 knots (31.9 km/h) maximum; 12.2 knots (22.6 km/h) cruising; Submerged: 14.5 knots (26.9 km/h) for ½ hour; 6.2 knots (11.5 km/h) snorkeling; 3.7 knots (6.9 km/h) cruising
- Range: 15,900 nautical miles (29,400 km) surfaced at 8.5 knots (15.7 km/h)
- Endurance: 36 hours at 3 knots (5.6 km/h) submerged
- Complement: 8–10 officers; 5 petty officers; 70-80 enlisted men
- Sensors & processing systems: BQS-4 active search sonar; BQR-2B passive search sonar; BQG-4 passive attack sonar

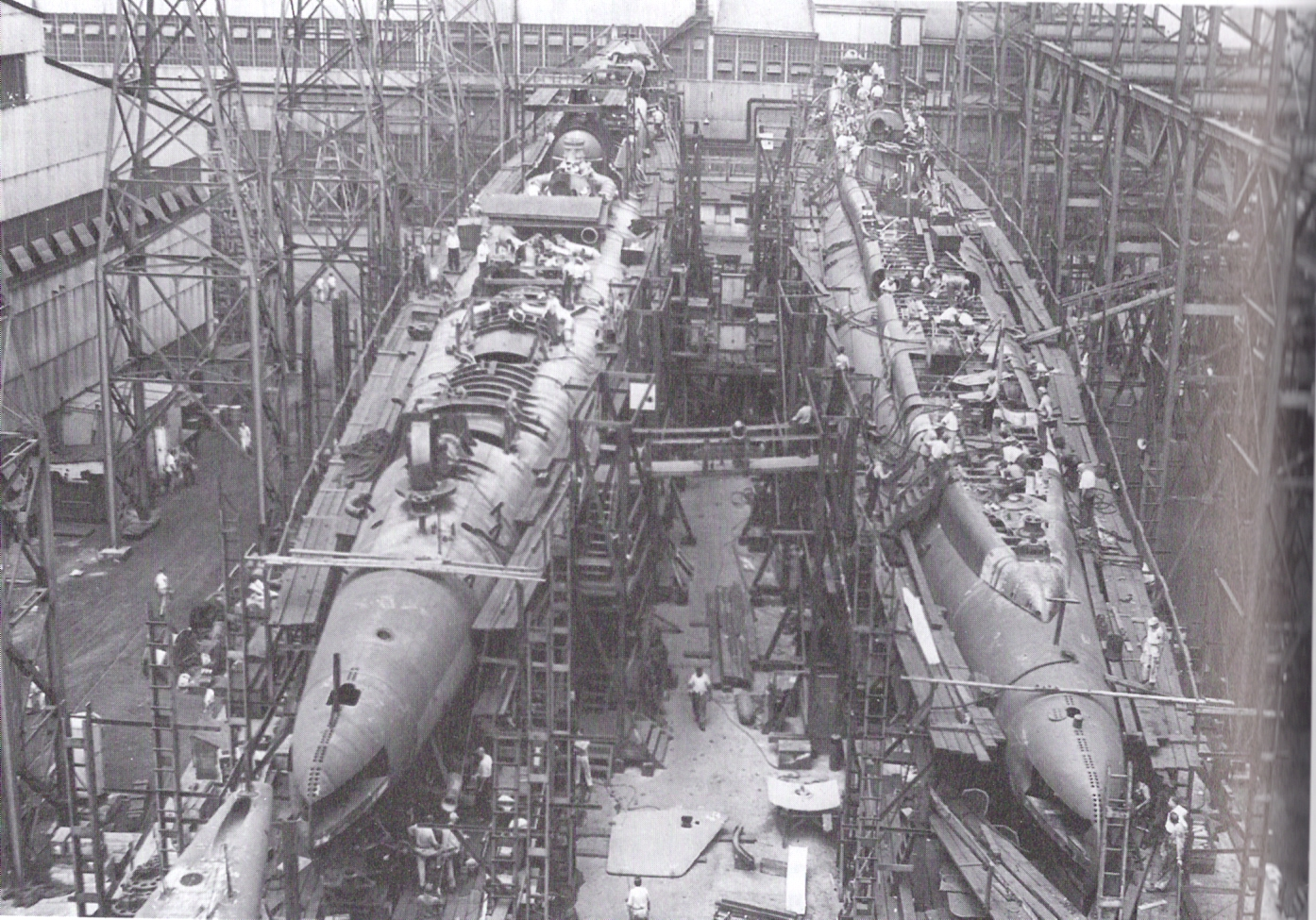
Ulua (left) and Trumpetfish (right) under construction at the Cramp Shipbuilding Company in Philadelphia on 2 July 1945.

USS Trumpetfish (SS-425), a Balao-class submarine, was the only ship of the United States Navy to be named for trumpetfish, any of several fishes so-called for their deep, compressed body and long, tubular snout. Her keel was laid down on 23 August 1943 at Philadelphia by the Cramp Shipbuilding Company. She was launched on 13 May 1945 sponsored by Mrs. Oswald S. Colclough, and commissioned on 29 January 1946.

Trumpetfish and Tusk are erroneously listed with the Tench class in some sources, as their hull numbers are in the sequence assigned to that class.

== Pacific Fleet service ==
A combined shakedown and goodwill cruise to ports in the Caribbean Sea in the early spring of 1946 preceded the submarine's westward cruise to Pearl Harbor. Highlighting the ship's training operations in Hawaiian waters was her intentional torpedoing of the large I-400-class submarines which had been captured at the end of World War II.

== Atlantic Fleet service ==
Trumpetfish returned to the East Coast for local operations out of New London, Connecticut, and, late in 1946, was briefly based at Annapolis to conduct training cruises for United States Naval Academy midshipmen. In the summer of 1947, as the ship underwent a Greater Underwater Propulsive Power Program (GUPPY) conversion, her hull was streamlined, a snorkel system was added, and higher capacity batteries were installed. The net result of the conversion enhanced the ship's offensive capabilities and increased her maximum submerged speed.

Attached to Submarine Squadron 4, based at Key West, Florida, Trumpetfish conducted local operations and training exercises off the East Coast. In September 1953, she participated in NATO Exercise "Mariner" and then was deployed to the Mediterranean Sea with the Sixth Fleet.

After returning home, the ship operated along the east coast and in the Caribbean through 1955. Following duties out of Key West in January and February 1956, Trumpetfish proceeded to Guantanamo Bay for service with the Fleet Training Group. In July, the ship took part in midshipmen training cruises from Annapolis, Maryland, to Guantanamo Bay and back.

In the fall of 1956, the ship joined a hunter-killer group for a deployment to Europe and the Middle East. Departing Norfolk on 1 October 1956, Trumpetfish sailed for European waters and participated in training exercises as she crossed the Atlantic. After calling at Brest, France, Trumpetfish suddenly received word of a crisis in the Levant.

== Middle East deployment ==
President of Egypt Gamal Abdel Nasser had nationalized the previously British-owned Suez Canal, and prevailing Arab-Israeli tensions had erupted into warfare while British and French troops attacked Egyptian positions. Trumpetfish made her best speed for Suda Bay and joined the Sixth Fleet in peace-keeping missions in the eastern Mediterranean. With the cessation of hostilities, Trumpetfish resumed her Mediterranean cruise operating briefly with the Italian fleet before returning to Key West on 28 January 1957.

The submarine conducted local operations out of her home port until 29 August, when she got underway for European waters and fall NATO exercises. Air, surface, and submarine forces of NATO nations engaged in tests and exercises to hone their capabilities to defend the NATO nations against possible aggression. After returning to Key West on 25 October, Trumpetfish operated out of that base conducting training and exercises into 1959.

During her next Mediterranean deployment, she snorkeled through the Strait of Bonifacio between Corsica and Sardinia. In August 1959, as part of Atlantic Fleet dispersal plans, Trumpetfish’s home port was changed to Charleston, South Carolina. During January and February 1960, the submarine took part in operations in the North Atlantic before briefly visiting Scotland. She subsequently participated in exercises in the western Atlantic Ocean, before a major refit at Charleston during 1961 modernized the ship to a Greater Underwater Propulsive Power Program (GUPPY) III configuration. The alterations increased her capabilities by adding 15 feet (4.6 m) to her length, by giving her better weapons and electronics, and by extending her range.

== Cuban Missile Crisis ==
Trumpetfish resumed a schedule of local antisubmarine warfare operations out of Charleston, alternating deployments to the Mediterranean and duty with the Sixth Fleet. She participated in emergency operations during the tension precipitated by the Cuban Missile Crisis in October 1962. The submarine later participated in several inter-type fleet exercises in home waters and in the Caribbean. Trumpetfish underwent a routine yard period at Charleston before taking part in Exercises "Plumb Bob I" and "Minibox" in 1965. After a Mediterranean deployment in early 1966, the ship took part in "Plumb Bob II" and provided services for the David Taylor Model Basin.

== Post Cuban Missile Crisis ==
Subsequently, assigned the primary mission of providing services for antisubmarine warfare forces, Trumpetfish stood ready to conduct mining and reconnaissance missions as well. On 12 January 1970, the submarine departed Charleston for Cape Kennedy, provided services en route to submarine Remora, and conducted type training exercises. A port visit to Cape Kennedy occupied 16 January to 18 January, before the submarine got underway for Fort Lauderdale, Florida, to provide services for the Naval Ordnance Laboratory Test Facility (NOLTF) there. Ten days of local operations at the NOLTF preceded the ship's providing services for Henry Clay during the nuclear ballistic missile submarine's sea trials off the Florida coast from 6 February to 8 February. Subsequently, taking part in Operations "Springboard" and "Exotic Dancer III," Trumpetfish headed for Philadelphia, and a yard overhaul which would last through the summer and fall and into December 1970.

After the long overhaul, the submarine participated in type and refresher training off the East Coast before she headed for the Caribbean in the spring. Among her activities were those which provided services for the Federal Republic of Germany's destroyer Lütjens between 7 May and 14 May.

On 5 June, after participating in a fleet naval mine test, Trumpetfish commenced six weeks of pre-deployment upkeep, with sea trials from 12 July to 16 July. On 23 July, the submarine departed for South American waters and Operation "Unites XII." Joining Task Force (TF) 86, Trumpetfish arrived at Cartagena, Colombia, on 6 August, prior to transiting the Panama Canal to proceed down the Pacific coast of South America. She crossed the equator on 20 August and made port at Callao, Peru, on 30 August. The ship operated with TF 86 for two weeks after the four-day port visit at Callao, before arriving at Valparaíso, Chile, on 17 September.

The submarine traversed the inland waterway and the Strait of Magellan and arrived at Punta Arenas, Chile, on 4 October. She conducted operations during "Unites XII" off the Atlantic coast of South America, with visits to March Del Plata, Argentina, and Rio de Janeiro, Brazil, before rejoining TF 86 at La Guaira, Venezuela, on 2 December. Bidding farewell to the task force four days later, the ship sailed for Charleston and arrived at her home port on 17 December 1971.

Trumpetfish remained with SubRon 4, operating out of Charleston through 1972. She deployed to the Caribbean again on 25 January 1973. Later conducting torpedo tests off Newport, Rhode Island, the submarine operated with British aircraft carrier Ark Royal off San Juan, Puerto Rico, in May, before returning to Charleston on 30 January. Upkeep, type training, and services for Patrol Wing 11 in the Jacksonville, Florida, area preceded the ship's arrival at Charleston on 15 August to prepare for decommissioning.

== Transfer to Brazilian Navy ==
On 15 October 1973, at Charleston, Trumpetfish was decommissioned, stricken from the Naval Vessel Register, and turned over to the Brazilian government.

She was commissioned into the Brazilian Navy as Goias (S-15) (named for Goias, the Brazilian state) with Commander Edouardo Russo her first commanding officer. Goias was deleted from the Marinha do Brasil on 16 April 1990.
