= USS Manta (SS-299) =

Submarine of the United States

Coordinates: 37.039°N 76.191°W

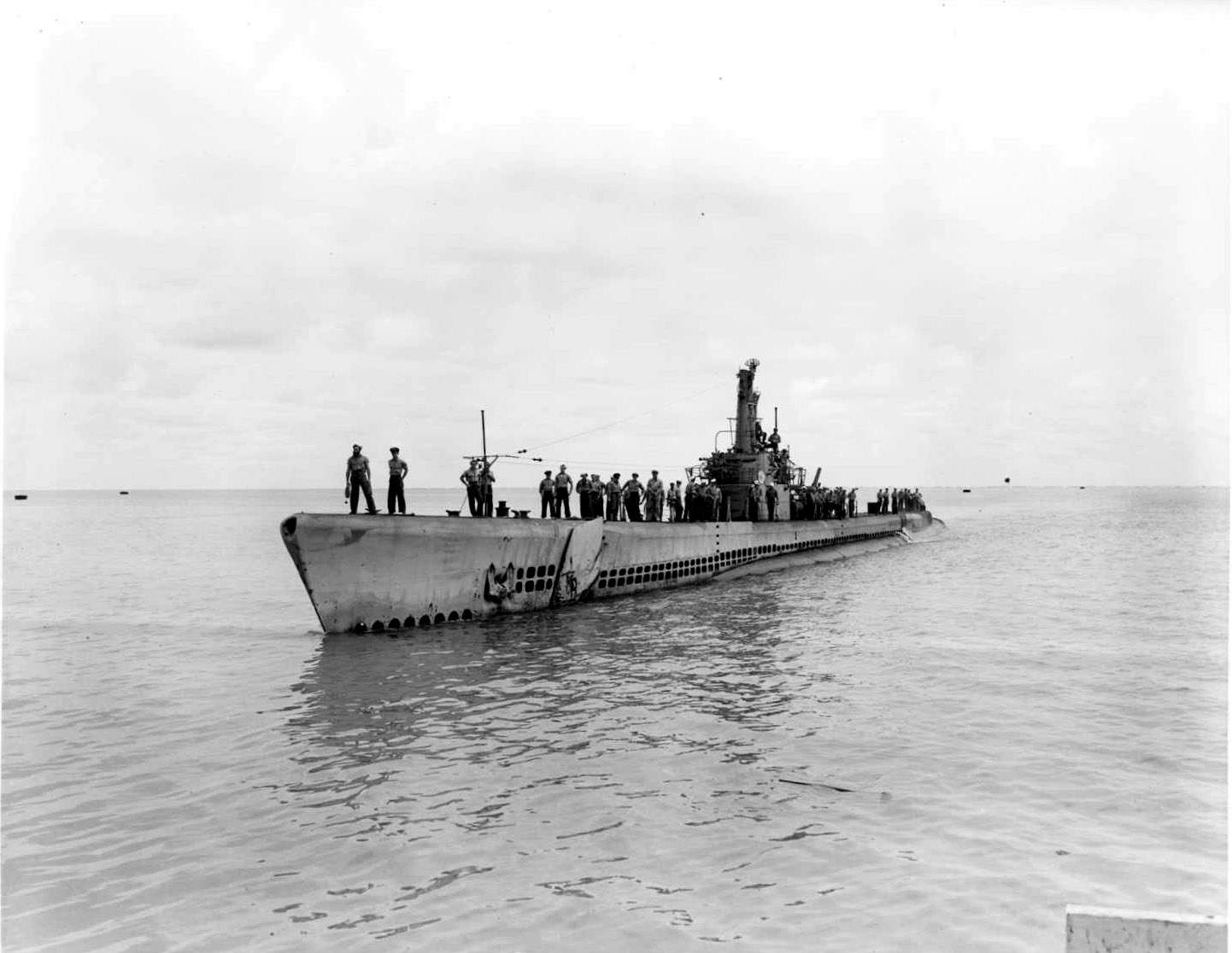
- USS Manta

History

United States
- Builder: Cramp Shipbuilding Company, Philadelphia, Pennsylvania
- Yard number: 554
- Laid down: 15 January 1943
- Launched: 7 November 1943
- Commissioned: 18 December 1944
- Decommissioned: 10 June 1946
- Recommissioned: 2 August 1949
- Decommissioned: 6 December 1955
- Stricken: 30 June 1967
- Fate: Sunk as a target off Hampton, Virginia, 16 July 1969

General characteristics
- Class & type: Balao class diesel-electric submarine
- Displacement: 1,526 tons (1,550 t) surfaced; 2,424 tons (2,463 t) submerged
- Length: 311 ft 6 in (94.95 m)
- Beam: 27 ft 3 in (8.31 m)
- Draft: 16 ft 10 in (5.13 m) maximum
- Propulsion: 4 × Fairbanks-Morse Model 38D8-1/8 9-cylinder opposed-piston diesel engines driving electrical generators; 2 × 126-cell Sargo batteries; 4 × high-speed Elliott electric motors with reduction gears; 2 × propellers; 5,400 shp (4.0 MW) surfaced; 2,740 shp (2.04 MW) submerged
- Speed: 20.25 knots (38 km/h) surfaced; 8.75 knots (16 km/h) submerged
- Range: 11,000 nautical miles (20,000 km) surfaced at 10 knots (19 km/h)
- Endurance: 48 hours at 2 knots (3.7 km/h) submerged; 75 days on patrol
- Test depth: 400 ft (120 m)
- Complement: 10 officers, 70–71 enlisted
- Armament: 10 × 21-inch (533 mm) torpedo tubes; 6 forward, 4 aft; 24 torpedoes; 1 × 5-inch (127 mm) / 25 caliber deck gun; Bofors 40 mm and Oerlikon 20 mm cannon

USS Manta (SS/ESS/AGSS-299), a Balao-class submarine, was the first submarine and second ship of the United States Navy to be named for the manta.

== Construction and commissioning ==
Manta was laid down on 15 January 1943 by the Cramp Shipbuilding Company at Philadelphia, Pennsylvania; launched on 7 November 1943, sponsored by Mrs. Michael J. Bradley; and commissioned on 18 December 1944.

== Service history ==
Upon completion of her shakedown cruise, Manta departed New London, Connecticut, 27 March 1945 for Hawaii via the Panama Canal. She sailed from Pearl Harbor 28 May 1945 for her first war patrol, off the Kurile Islands. Returning 16 July, she began her second patrol 8 August and ended it with the cessation of hostilities 15 August.

Returning to Pearl Harbor 10 September, Manta engaged in training through December. On 2 January 1946, she sailed for San Francisco and preinactivation overhaul. She was decommissioned 10 June 1946 and placed in the Pacific Reserve Fleet.

Manta recommissioned 2 August 1949, Lt. E. H. Edwards, Jr., in command, as ESS-299. On 1 September she was redesignated AGSS-299 and ordered to Key West, Fla. For the next 4 years she operated as a target ship for experimental antisubmarine warfare projects of Operational Development Force, Atlantic Fleet.

On 5 July 1955, Manta departed Key West for Portsmouth, N.H., to prepare for inactivation. Towed to New London, she decommissioned 6 December 1955 and was placed in the Inactive Reserve Fleet. In April 1960 she was assigned to Naval Reserve training duties with the 3rd Naval District. Declared as excess to the needs of the Navy, she was struck from the Navy List on 30 June 1967 and sunk as an aircraft target off Hampton, Virginia on 16 July 1969.

== Awards ==
- Asiatic-Pacific Campaign Medal
- World War II Victory Medal
- National Defense Service Medal
