= USS Turbot (SS-427) =

Submarine of the United States

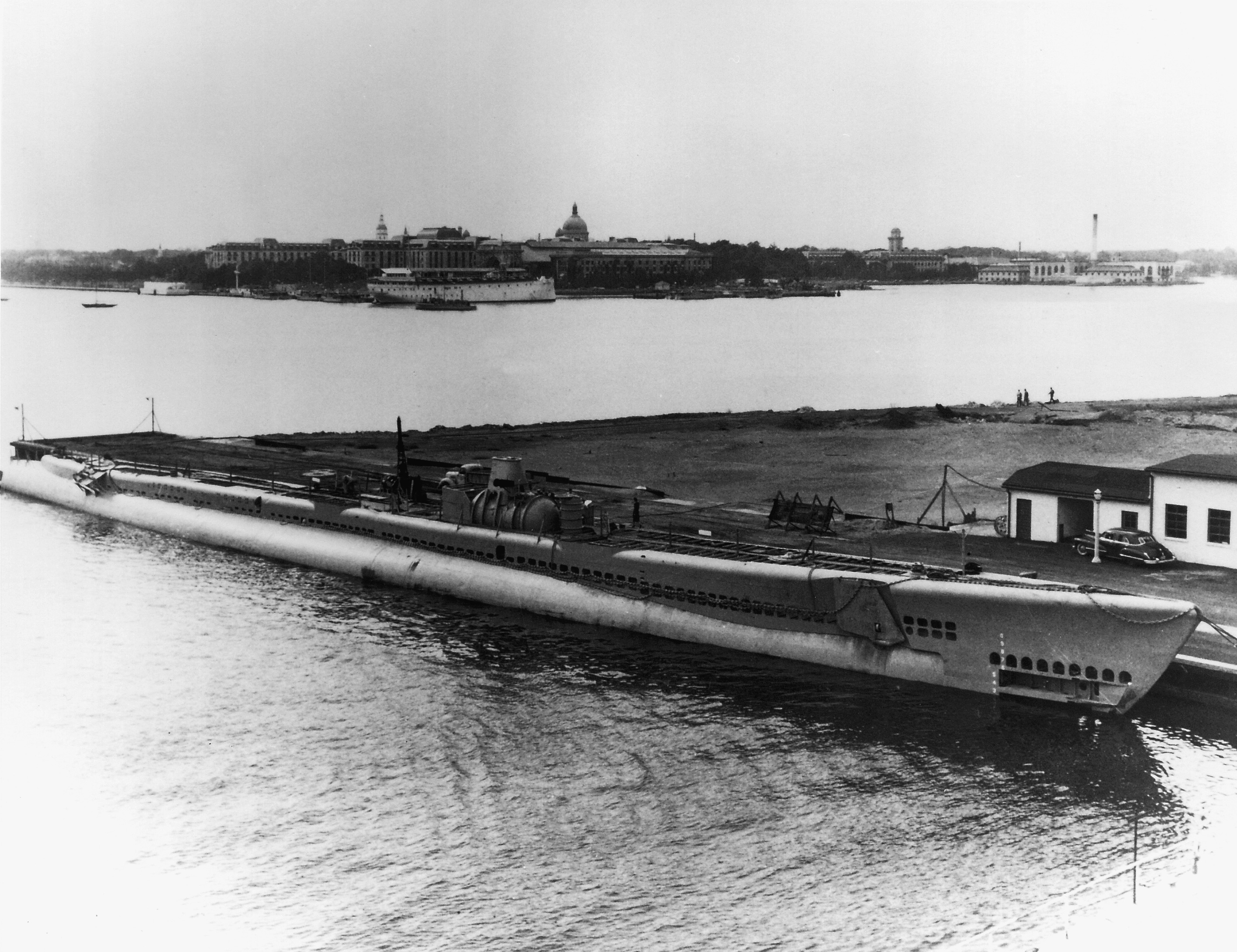
- The partially completed hulk of USS Turbot.

History

United States
- Name: Turbot
- Namesake: The turbot
- Builder: Cramp Shipbuilding Company, Philadelphia, Pennsylvania
- Laid down: 13 November 1943
- Launched: as incomplete hulk 12 April 1946
- Completed: Never
- Commissioned: Never
- Stricken: 1958
- Fate: Construction contract cancelled 12 August 1945
- Notes: Served as testing hulk; survived as such into the 1980s

General characteristics
- Class & type: Balao-class diesel-electric submarine
- Displacement: 1,526 long tons (1,550 t) surfaced, 2,414 long tons (2,453 t) submerged
- Length: 311 ft 9 in (95.02 m)
- Beam: 27 ft 3 in (8.31 m)
- Draft: 16 ft 10 in (5.13 m) maximum
- Propulsion: 4 × General Motors Model 16-248 V16 Diesel engines driving electric generators; 2 × 126-cell Sargo batteries; 4 × high-speed General Electric electric motors with reduction gears; two propellers; 5,400 shp (4.0 MW) surfaced; 2,740 shp (2.0 MW) submerged
- Speed: 20.25 knots (37.50 km/h; 23.30 mph) surfaced, 8.75 knots (16.21 km/h; 10.07 mph) submerged
- Range: 11,000 nmi (20,000 km; 13,000 mi) surfaced at 10 kn (19 km/h; 12 mph)
- Endurance: 48 hours at 2 kn (3.7 km/h; 2.3 mph) submerged, 75 days on patrol
- Test depth: 400 ft (120 m)
- Complement: 10 officers, 70–71 enlisted
- Armament: 10 × 21-inch (533 mm) torpedo tubes; 6 forward, 4 aft; 24 torpedoes; 1 × 4-inch (102 mm) / 50 caliber deck gun; Bofors 40 mm and Oerlikon 20 mm cannon

USS Turbot (SS-427), a Balao-class submarine, was the second ship of the United States Navy to be named for the turbot, a large, brown and white flatfish, valued as a food.

Turbot's keel was laid down on 13 November 1943 at Philadelphia, Pennsylvania, by the Cramp Shipbuilding Company, but the contract for her construction was cancelled on 12 August 1945. Her partially completed hulk was launched on 12 April 1946 and, in 1950, was assigned to the Naval Ship Research and Development Center at Annapolis, Maryland, where it was used for research and development in connection with the control and reduction of machinery noise in submarines.

Turbot was stricken from the Naval Vessel Register in 1958, and sold for scrapping to the Bethlehem Steel Corporation, at Sparrow's Point, Maryland; however, rather than being scrapped, she remained tied up to a U.S. Navy pier in Carr's Creek at the North Severn Naval Station in Maryland, where she continued to be used for testing well into the 1980s. Some material was removed from her hulk for use in other submarines, including her six torpedo air flasks, which were installed in the submarine USS Pampanito (SS-383) in San Francisco, California.
