= USS Chub =

Submarine of the United States

Coordinates: 6°15′S 116°01′E

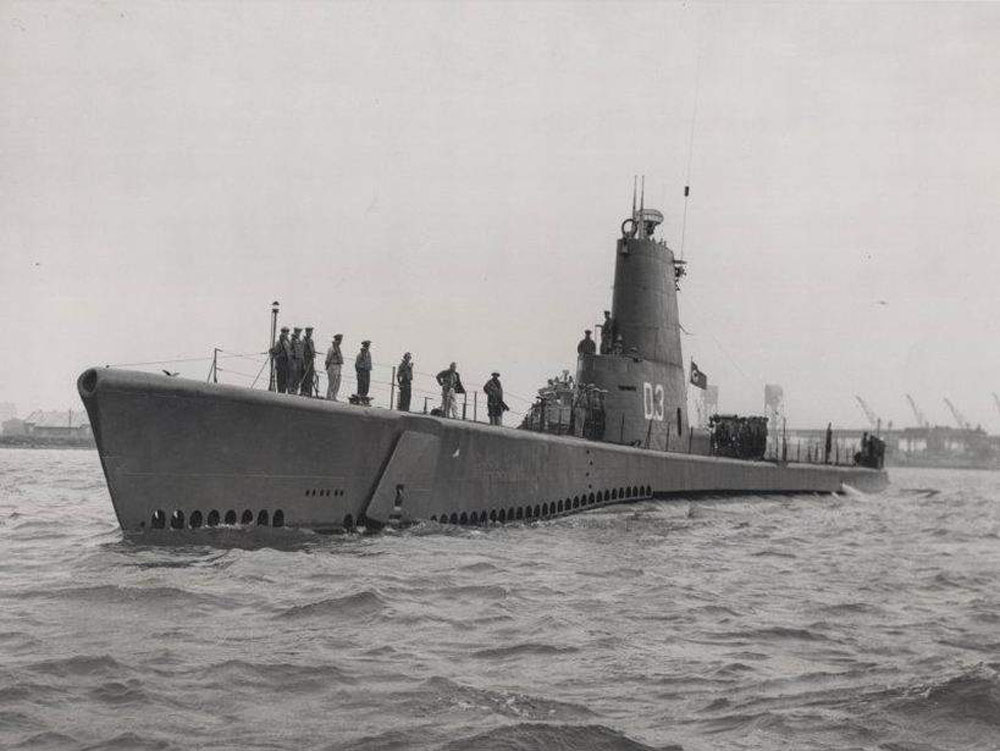
- Gür (D-3) after snorkel overhaul off the Philadelphia Navy Yard on 3 September 1954.

History

United States
- Name: USS Chub (SS-329)
- Builder: Electric Boat Company, Groton, Connecticut
- Laid down: 16 September 1943
- Launched: 18 June 1944
- Commissioned: 21 October 1944
- Decommissioned: 23 May 1948
- Stricken: 28 May 1948
- Fate: Transferred to Turkey, 25 May 1948

Turkey
- Name: TCG Gür (S 334)
- Acquired: 25 May 1948
- Decommissioned: 12 December 1975
- Fate: Returned to US custody and scrapped

General characteristics
- Class & type: Balao class diesel-electric submarine
- Displacement: 1,526 tons (1,550 t) surfaced; 2,424 tons (2,463 t) submerged
- Length: 311 ft 9 in (95.02 m)
- Beam: 27 ft 3 in (8.31 m)
- Draft: 16 ft 10 in (5.13 m) maximum
- Propulsion: 4 × General Motors Model 16-278A V16 diesel engines driving electrical generators; 2 × 126-cell Sargo batteries; 4 × high-speed General Electric electric motors with reduction gears; 2 × propellers; 5,400 shp (4.0 MW) surfaced; 2,740 shp (2.0 MW) submerged
- Speed: 20.25 knots (38 km/h) surfaced; 8.75 knots (16 km/h) submerged
- Range: 11,000 nautical miles (20,000 km) surfaced at 10 knots (19 km/h)
- Endurance: 48 hours at 2 knots (3.7 km/h) submerged; 75 days on patrol
- Test depth: 400 ft (120 m)
- Complement: 10 officers, 70–71 enlisted
- Armament: 10 × 21-inch (533 mm) torpedo tubes; 6 forward, 4 aft; 24 torpedoes; 1 × 5-inch (127 mm) / 25 caliber deck gun; Bofors 40 mm and Oerlikon 20 mm cannon

USS Chub (SS-329), a Balao-class submarine, was a ship of the United States Navy named for the chub, a game fish of the Atlantic and Mediterranean. The name is also given locally to a wide variety of American fishes. She was later transferred to Turkey where she served as TCG Gür (S 334).

== Operational history ==
=== USS Chub ===
SS-329, originally named Bonaci, was renamed Chub on 24 September 1942 and launched 18 June 1944 by Electric Boat Co., Groton, Conn.; sponsored by Mrs. T. A. Risch; and commissioned 21 October 1944.

==== First war patrol, February – April 1945 ====
Chub reached Pearl Harbor from New London 24 January 1945, and after final training, put to sea for action waters 13 February. Her first war patrol, in Tonkin Gulf and the Java and South China Seas, found her skill and determination tried in four hairbreadth escapes from destruction.

On 3 March, she was attacked by an enemy submarine whose torpedoes she evaded. On 29 March, she began a long surface chase after an escort group, which she carried through the next day, even though forced six times to go deep by enemy aircraft. On their last pass, they dropped bombs, a clear indication that Chub's chase must be broken off.

The next day she was off Yulikan Bay, and while American and Japanese planes fought in the skies above, Chub rescued three downed pilots as they and she were strafed. With two Japanese patrol craft looming out of the harbor, Chub raced away. On 12 April, Chub was bombed by an enemy patrol plane as the submarine dove. Bomb damage caused a temporary loss of power, and with depth control lost, Chub broached. Fortunately, the aircraft had apparently dropped its entire load on the first run.

==== Second and third war patrols, May – August 1945 ====
Chub put into Fremantle, Australia to repair and refit from 18 April 1945 to 14 May, and then sailed for the Java Sea and her second war patrol. During this patrol, she attacked two freighters, and sank the minesweeper W-34 which had come out hunting for her. The damage already done to Japanese shipping made targets few by this time, and Chub put into Subic Bay from 21 June to 15 July to refit.

Her third war patrol found her again in the Java Sea, sinking a number of small craft, although again and again attacked by the remnant of Japanese air strength. Returning to Fremantle 17 August, she sailed on to Subic Bay for training through the remainder of 1945, then returned to the West Coast.

==== 1946 – 1947 ====
During 1946, Chub operated from Pearl Harbor, her new home port, visiting the west coast for necessary overhaul. Between 12 November 1946 and 14 February 1947, she served in the Far East, making a simulated war patrol, and training with the 7th Fleet. During late 1947, she joined in a training cruise in Alaskan waters, and voyaged from Seattle to San Francisco with reservists on board for training.

After overhaul at San Francisco she put to sea 4 March 1948 to call at New London, then crossed the Atlantic and Mediterranean to İzmir, Turkey, arriving 11 May. She was decommissioned and struck from the Naval Vessel Register 23 May 1948.

==== Honors and awards ====
Chub received three battle stars for World War II service by reason of her three "successful" war patrols. She is credited with having sunk a total of 4,200 tons of shipping.

=== TCG Gür ===
The ex-Chub was transferred to Turkey on 25 May 1948, and was commissioned in the Turkish Navy as TCG Gür (S 334). In 1953, she was converted to a GUPPY Fleet Snorkel Submarine, the work being done first in Turkey's Gölcük Navy Yard and completed in the United States.

Gür was decommissioned on 12 December 1975, returned to U.S. custody, and sold for scrapping.
