= USS Sea Robin =

Submarine of the United States

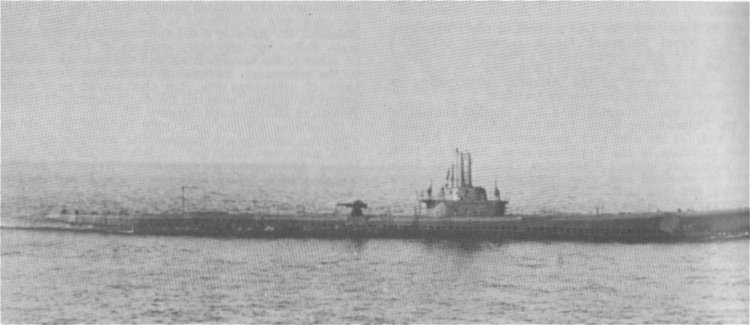
- Sea Robin (SS-407) during shakedown training off Portsmouth, N.H., 4 September 1944.

History

United States
- Name: USS Sea Robin
- Builder: Portsmouth Naval Shipyard, Kittery, Maine
- Laid down: 1 March 1944
- Launched: 25 May 1944
- Commissioned: 7 August 1944
- Decommissioned: 1 October 1970
- Stricken: 1 October 1970
- Fate: Sold for scrap, 3 June 1971

General characteristics (As completed)
- Class & type: Balao-class diesel-electric submarine
- Displacement: 1,526 long tons (1,550 t) surfaced; 2,401 long tons (2,440 t) submerged
- Length: 311 ft 8 in (95.00 m)
- Beam: 27 ft 3 in (8.31 m)
- Draft: 16 ft 10 in (5.13 m) maximum
- Propulsion: 4 × Fairbanks-Morse Model 38D8-⅛ 10-cylinder opposed piston diesel engines driving electrical generators; 2 × 126-cell Sargo batteries; 2 × low-speed direct-drive Elliott electric motors; two propellers; 5,400 shp (4.0 MW) surfaced; 2,740 shp (2.0 MW) submerged
- Speed: 20.25 knots (38 km/h) surfaced; 8.75 knots (16 km/h) submerged
- Range: 11,000 nautical miles (20,000 km) surfaced at 10 knots (19 km/h)
- Endurance: 48 hours at 2 knots (3.7 km/h) submerged; 75 days on patrol
- Test depth: 400 ft (120 m)
- Complement: 10 officers, 70–71 enlisted
- Armament: 10 × 21-inch (533 mm) torpedo tubes; 6 forward, 4 aft; 24 torpedoes; 1 × 5-inch (127 mm) / 25 caliber deck gun; Bofors 40 mm and Oerlikon 20 mm cannon

General characteristics (Guppy IA)
- Class & type: none
- Displacement: 1,830 tons (1,859 t) surfaced; 2,440 long tons (2,480 t) submerged
- Length: 307 ft 7 in (93.75 m)
- Beam: 27 ft 4 in (8.33 m)
- Draft: 17 ft (5.2 m)
- Propulsion: Snorkel added; Batteries upgraded to Sargo II
- Speed: Surfaced: 17.3 knots (32.0 km/h) maximum; 12.5 knots (23.2 km/h) cruising; Submerged: 15.0 knots (27.8 km/h) for ½ hour; 7.5 knots (13.9 km/h) snorkeling; 3.0 knots (5.6 km/h) cruising
- Range: 17,000 nautical miles (31,000 km) surfaced at 11 knots (20 km/h)
- Endurance: 36 hours at 3 knots (6 km/h) submerged
- Complement: 10 officers; 5 petty officers; 64–69 enlisted men
- Armament: 10 × 21 inch (533 mm) torpedo tubes; (six forward, four aft); all guns removed

USS Sea Robin (SS-407), a Balao-class submarine, was a vessel of the United States Navy named for the sea robin. This is a spiny-finned fish with red or brown coloring on its body and fins. The first three rays of its pectoral fin separate from the others and are used in walking on the sea bottom.

== Construction and commissioning ==
Sea Robin was laid down by the Portsmouth Navy Yard in Kittery, Maine, on 1 March 1944, launched on 25 May 1944, sponsored by Mrs. Homer Ambrose, wife of Captain Ambrose, the navy yard's production superintendent, and commissioned on 7 August 1944.

== First patrol, November 1944 – January 1945 ==
After shakedown off Portsmouth, New Hampshire, and New London, Connecticut, Sea Robin transited the Panama Canal on 12 October 1944 following an incident with a Scandinavian merchant ship which, mistaking the submarine for a German U-boat, frantically scattered shells in the general direction of the surfaced "enemy." Fortunately, Sea Robin was out of range and escaped without damage.

After spending six days at Pearl Harbor, Sea Robin sailed for the Luzon Strait and her first war patrol where, on 6 January 1945, she torpedoed and sank her initial victim of the war, the 5,000-ton Japanese tanker Tarakan Maru. Except for dodging floating mines, the remainder of the submarine's first patrol was uneventful; and she returned to port at Fremantle, Western Australia, on 29 January 1945.

== Second patrol, February – April 1945 ==
Sea Robin's second patrol proved to be her most productive of the war. On 3 March, while patrolling north of Surabaja in the Java Sea, the boat evaded a Japanese escort ship and torpedoed the cargo ship, Suiten Maru (2,500 tons). After several unsuccessful attempts to rescue survivors, the submarine finally hauled three prisoners of war on board and continued her patrol.

Two days later, Sea Robin contacted a troop-laden convoy of two cargo ships, a converted gunboat, and several escorts. The gunboat Manyo Maru (2,900 tons) was the first to be sent to the bottom, the victim of three torpedo hits. After evading the suddenly active escort vessels, the submarine commenced an end around and, several hours later, was again in firing position. Shoyu Maru (853 tons), the first of the two vessels, was zigzagging radically but was unable to avoid the three torpedoes that Sea Robin fired at her. She took one hit below her bridge and settled quickly by the bow. Sea Robin then fired a spread of three torpedoes at the remaining ship, but the target zigged and they missed. On the second attempt, the ship was not so fortunate. After watching the target completely reverse course, the submarine fired three more torpedoes at a range of 900 yards (820 m) with one hit amidships that broke netlayer Nagaru Maru (856 tons) in half and sent her rapidly to the bottom. Sea Robin now began to pay the price for her success. For 24 hours, she was pursued by the escorts and accompanying aircraft; but made good her escape and arrived at Subic Bay, Philippines, on 15 March to replenish her depleted torpedo store.

Departing Subic Bay on 19 March, Sea Robin set course for the South China Sea in the area of the island of Hainan where, on 23 March, she rescued a downed airman. On 30 March, the submarine found herself in the middle of a group of six Japanese destroyers. Midway between two of them, she launched three torpedoes at the first, but a quick turn of the ship caused them to pass harmlessly across the bow. The second destroyer swerved 90° and began to bear down on Sea Robin. After 20 minutes of depth charging, the submarine extricated herself and, with Hainan a scant 10 miles (16 km) away, again attacked, but a spread of six torpedoes failed to find a target, and the submarine resumed patrol.

On 8 April, Sea Robin sank two small Japanese fishing vessels, taking three prisoners of war and, on the following day, took on board 10 more Japanese, survivors of a foundering trawler that had been attacked by Allied aircraft. The submarine terminated her second patrol at Pearl Harbor on 29 April.

== Third patrol, June – August 1945 ==
Sea Robin departed Pearl Harbor 1 June on her third and final war patrol which was conducted in the Yellow Sea and East China Sea. She was in the East China Sea at 31°30′N 138°37′E, about 105 nautical miles (194 km; 121 mi) southwest of Aogashima in the Nanpō Islands, on lifeguard duty in support of air raids on Japan by United States Army Air Forces B-29 Superfortress bombers on 26 June 1945 when a full load of bombs a B-29 had jettisoned through overcast landed in the sea only 1,000 yards (910 m) from her. She suffered no damage or casualties.

After sinking a small patrol craft on 9 July and taking one prisoner, Sea Robin torpedoed and sank the cargo ship, Sakishima Maru, on 10 July. Shortly thereafter, while attempting to sink a large sampan, the submarine was caught on the surface by a Japanese plane. Although the pilot did not drop his bombs on the first pass, thus giving Sea Robin a chance to dive, he dropped two close aboard on the second. Although it was not discovered until the end of the patrol, the submarine's bow tubes were severely damaged causing numerous torpedo misses throughout the remainder of the patrol. With the exception of several trawlers sunk in surface attacks, the remainder of the patrol was unproductive.

When the war ended on 15 August, Sea Robin was moored at Midway Island. After a one-day stop at Pearl Harbor, the boat headed for home, transiting the Panama Canal on 20 September and arriving at Galveston, Texas, four days later.

== 1945 – 1951 ==
Peacetime assignment brought Sea Robin to Submarine Squadron 6 (SubRon 6) based at Balboa, Canal Zone. On 15 May 1947, the submarine commenced a 1 1/2-month simulated war patrol in which she circumnavigated the South American continent and became the first U.S. submarine to round Cape Horn. The year 1948 was spent in fleet training exercises in the Balboa and Key West areas.

Following overhaul at the Philadelphia Naval Shipyard, Sea Robin was reassigned to SubRon 8 based at Naval Submarine Base New London, arriving on 20 August 1949. On 23 February 1950, the submarine departed New London for participation in Exercise "Portex," a joint Army-Navy-Air Force exercise in the Caribbean, returning on 23 March. From September through November, she was engaged in her first tour of duty with the 6th Fleet in the Mediterranean.

== 1951 – 1955 ==
In 1951, Sea Robin was converted to a GUPPY IA submarine, following which she returned to New London for local operations. In January and February 1952, the submarine participated in Exercise "Micowex" in the North Atlantic testing cold weather gear and procedures under the supervision of the Naval Research Laboratory, New London, followed by a return to warmer waters and participation in Exercise "Pacex" in the Caribbean. For the next two years, Sea Robin was engaged in local fleet and training operations in the New London area.

On 30 August 1954, Sea Robin set sail for a six-week northern training cruise which stretched across the Arctic Circle and included stops at Glasgow, Scotland; and Belfast, Northern Ireland. On 4 January 1955, the submarine departed for six weeks in the Caribbean participating in operation "Springboard" and, in September, took part in NATO exercise "New Broom IV," visiting Saint John, New Brunswick, en route home to New London, where she operated locally for the remainder of the year.

== 1956 – 1970 ==
After engaging in special operations in late 1956 and early 1957, Sea Robin resumed normal duties in the New London area until entering the Portsmouth Naval Shipyard on 24 July 1957 for a two-month overhaul. Upon return to New London, she engaged in fleet exercises in the Atlantic and Caribbean until 28 March 1958 when she set sail for a 3 1/2-month tour of duty with the 6th Fleet in the Mediterranean. From Jan - May 1963 she again conducted a tour of duty in the Mediterranean. For the next five years, with time out for regularly scheduled overhaul periods, Sea Robin operated in Atlantic and Caribbean waters, engaging in fleet antisubmarine warfare exercises and providing services to the United States Naval Submarine School.

In September 1964, Sea Robin in the company of Piper participated in exercise "Master Stroke" with United States, Canadian, and British forces. During this exercise, they conducted port calls in Portsmouth, England and Rotterdam, Holland. Sea Robin returned to New London for local operations and entered Portsmouth Naval Shipyard in November for a scheduled overhaul, remaining there until April 1965. Following shakedown operations, Sea Robin, Becuna and Sea Owl departed New London in July for exercise with the 6th Fleet in the Mediterranean returning to New London in October. The year 1966 was spent in participation with operation "Springboard" forces in the Caribbean providing services to naval air squadrons and surface units followed by training and antisubmarine warfare (ASW) exercises in the New London area. A scheduled main battery replacement was performed at Portsmouth Naval Shipyard during the months of July and August.

Sea Robin participated in Operation Springboard in the early months of 1967, and resumed normal operations upon her return to New London. On 22 May 1967, Sea Robin put to sea in company with Tusk, Sablefish, and Sea Owl for a two-month tour of northern European ports stopping at Portsmouth, England; Cherbourg, France; Derry, Northern Ireland; and various Scandinavian ports. From 2 October through 1 February 1968, Sea Robin underwent overhaul at the Philadelphia Naval Shipyard and upon completion resumed normal duties in the Atlantic and Caribbean. On 1 December 1969, the submarine was transferred to SubRon 2, also based at New London.

Highlights of 1970 were participation in operation "Springboard" in January and February and NATO exercise "Steel Ring" in April and May. On 4 August, the submarine made her 12,920th and final dive. On 1 October 1970, Sea Robin was decommissioned and struck from the Navy list. She was sold for scrap on 3 June 1971 to the North American Smelting Co., Wilmington, Del.

== Honors and awards ==
- Asiatic-Pacific Campaign Medal with three battle stars
- World War II Victory Medal
- National Defense Service Medal with star
