= Cusk =

Cusk may refer to:

- Cusk (fish), a fish of the northern Atlantic Ocean in the genus Brosme
- USS Cusk (SS-348), a submarine
- Burbot, a fish of the northern polar oceans in the genus Lota
- One of various species of fish in the cusk eel family
- Rachel Cusk, British novelist and writer
