= USS Lancetfish =

Submarine of the United States

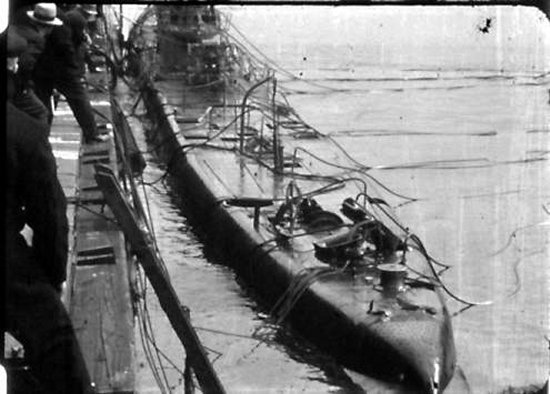
- Lancetfish (SS-296) is finally on a level keel on March 23, 1945, eight days following her accidental sinking at Pier 8 East of the Boston Navy Yard. She would be decommissioned the following day, 24 March.

History

United States
- Builder: William Cramp & Sons, Philadelphia
- Yard number: 551
- Laid down: 30 September 1942
- Launched: 15 August 1943
- Commissioned: 12 February 1945
- Decommissioned: 24 March 1945
- Stricken: 9 June 1958
- Fate: Sold for scrap, 20 August 1959

General characteristics
- Class & type: Balao-class diesel-electric submarine
- Displacement: 1,526 tons (1550 t) surfaced; 2,424 tons (2460 t) submerged
- Length: 311 ft 8 in (95.00 m)
- Beam: 27 ft 3 in (8.31 m)
- Draft: 16 ft 10 in (5.13 m) maximum
- Propulsion: 4 × Fairbanks-Morse Model 38D8-1/8 9-cylinder opposed-piston diesel engines driving electrical generators; 2 × 126-cell Sargo batteries; 4 × high-speed Elliott electric motors with reduction gears; 2 × propellers; 5,400 shp (4.0 MW) surfaced; 2,740 shp (2.04 MW) submerged
- Speed: 20.25 knots (37 km/h) surfaced; 8.75 knots (16 km/h) submerged
- Range: 11,000 nm (20,000 km) surfaced at 10 knots (19 km/h)
- Endurance: 48 hours at 2 knots (4 km/h) submerged; 75 days on patrol
- Test depth: 400 ft (120 m)
- Complement: 10 officers, 70–71 enlisted
- Armament: 10 × 21-inch (533 mm) torpedo tubes; 6 forward, 4 aft; 24 torpedoes; 1 × 4-inch (102 mm) / 50 caliber deck gun; Bofors 40 mm and Oerlikon 20 mm cannon

USS Lancetfish (SS-296), a Balao-class submarine, was the only ship of the United States Navy to be named for the lancetfish (Alepisaurus ferox), a large voracious, deep sea fish having long lancetlike teeth and a high long dorsal fin.

Her keel was laid down on 30 September 1942 by Cramp Shipbuilding Company of Philadelphia. She was launched on 15 August 1943 sponsored by Miss Beatrice P. Barker, towed to Boston Navy Yard 19 May 1944 for completion, and commissioned 12 February 1945.

The beginning of the salvage operation for Lancetfish (SS-296), 23 March 1945.

While tied up alongside Pier 8, Lancetfish flooded through an aft torpedo tube and sank 15 March 1945. She was raised eight days later and decommissioned 24 March. Assigned to the Atlantic Reserve Fleet in uncompleted condition, she was transferred to the First Naval District 27 February 1947 and was assigned to the New London Group 9 December 1952. She was struck from the Naval Vessel Register on 9 June 1958 and sold for scrap for $57,189 on 20 August 1959 having never gone to sea on patrol, to Yale Waste Company, Boston, Massachusetts.

Although Lancetfish was commissioned at the time of her sinking, she never saw active service, and she is not counted among the 52 American submarines lost during World War II.
