= USS Sabalo (SS-302) =

Submarine of the United States

Coordinates: 32.7052°N 117.4424°W

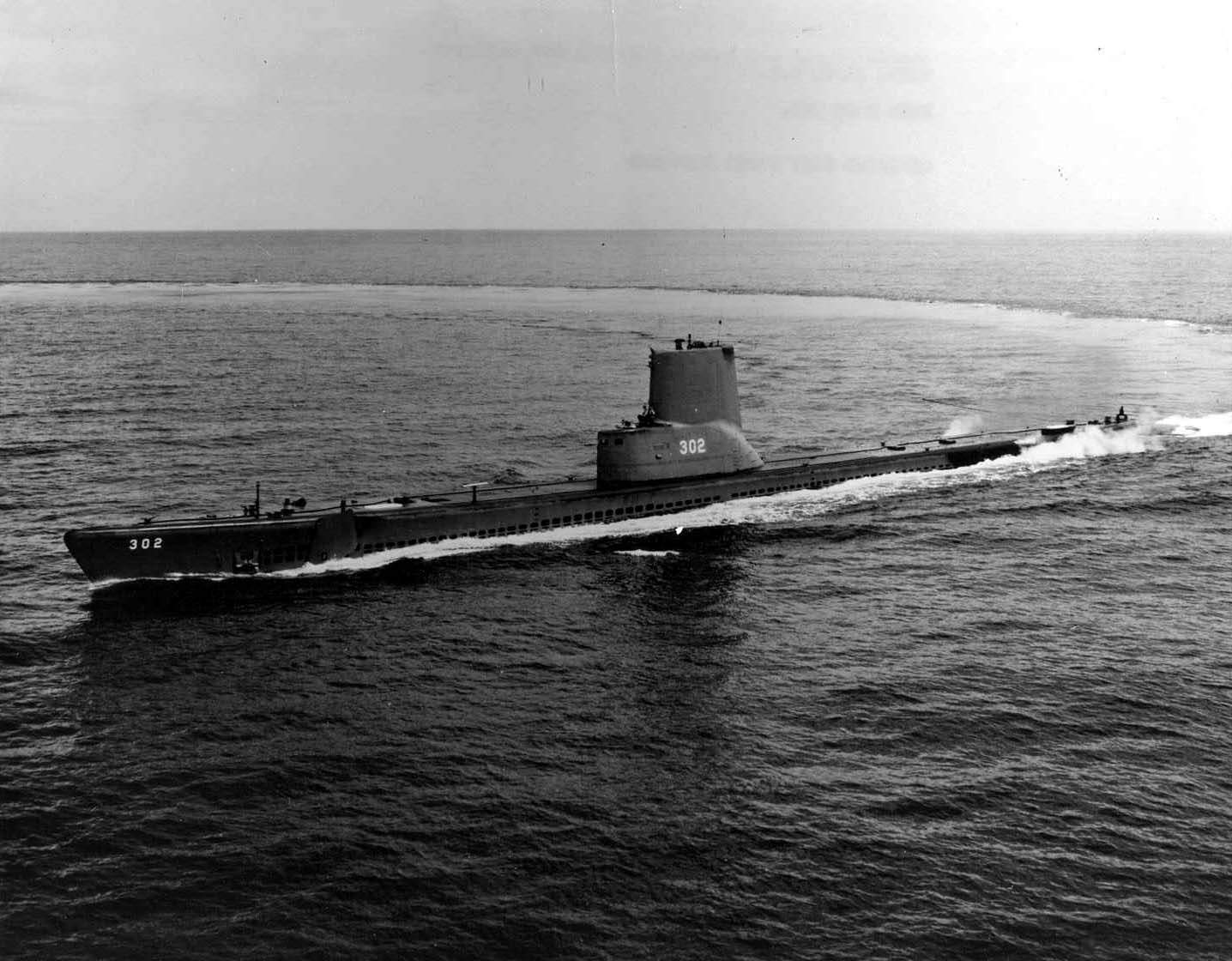
- Sabalo (SS-302) after conversion to a "Fleet Snorkel" type, post-1952.

History

United States
- Name: Sabalo
- Namesake: Sabalo, alternative name for the Atlantic tarpon
- Builder: Cramp Shipbuilding Co., Philadelphia
- Yard number: 557
- Laid down: 5 June 1943
- Launched: 4 June 1944
- Sponsored by: Mrs. Martha C. Oman
- Commissioned: 19 June 1945
- Decommissioned: 7 August 1946
- Recommissioned: June 1951
- Decommissioned: 1 July 1971
- Stricken: 1 July 1971
- Fate: Sunk as a target, 15 February 1973

General characteristics
- Class & type: Balao class diesel-electric submarine
- Displacement: 1,526 tons (1,550 t) surfaced; 2,424 tons (2,463 t) submerged
- Length: 311 ft 8 in (95.00 m)
- Beam: 27 ft 3 in (8.31 m)
- Draft: 16 ft 10 in (5.13 m) maximum
- Propulsion: 4 × Fairbanks-Morse Model 38D8-⅛ 10-cylinder opposed piston diesel engines driving electrical generators; 2 × 126-cell Sargo batteries; 4 × high-speed Elliott electric motors with reduction gears; two propellers; 5,400 shp (4.0 MW) surfaced; 2,740 shp (2.0 MW) submerged
- Speed: 20.25 knots (38 km/h) surfaced; 8.75 knots (16 km/h) submerged
- Range: 11,000 nautical miles (20,000 km) surfaced at 10 knots (19 km/h)
- Endurance: 48 hours at 2 knots (3.7 km/h) submerged; 75 days on patrol
- Test depth: 400 ft (120 m)
- Complement: 10 officers, 70–71 enlisted
- Armament: 10 × 21-inch (533 mm) torpedo tubes; 6 forward, 4 aft; 24 torpedoes; 1 × 5-inch (127 mm) / 25 caliber deck gun; Bofors 40 mm and Oerlikon 20 mm cannon

USS Sabalo (SS-302), a Balao-class submarine, was the first submarine and second ship of the United States Navy to be named sabalo, another name for the Atlantic tarpon, a large, silvery game fish of the herring group, found in the warmer parts of the Western Atlantic.

== Construction and commissioning ==
Sabalo (SS-302) was laid down on 5 June 1943 by the Cramp Shipbuilding Company at Philadelphia, Pennsylvania; launched on 4 June 1944, sponsored by Mrs. Martha C. Oman, wife of Rear Admiral Charles M. Oman (ret.), commander of the U S Naval Convalescent Hospital in Monroe, New York; and commissioned on 19 June 1945 at the Philadelphia Navy Yard in Philadelphia.

== Service history ==
After trials in the Delaware River, Sabalo proceeded to Naval Submarine Base New London at New London, Connecticut, for shakedown and training. She operated locally from New London until June 1946, when she began preparations for inactivation. She was decommissioned on 7 August 1946 at Portsmouth Navy Yard in Kittery, Maine, and was placed in reserve in the Atlantic Reserve Fleet, remaining there until recommissioning on 1 June 1951 at the Atlantic Reserve Fleet, New London.

In August 1951, Sabalo departed New London for Pearl Harbor, Hawaii, her new home port. Arriving in September 1951, she conducted local operations into February 1952. From 18 February to 28 September 1952, she underwent conversion to a Fleet Snorkel type at the Pearl Harbor Naval Shipyard. This was a less-extensive alteration than the GUPPY conversion received by many World War IIera fleet submarines during the same general period. Sabalo′s conning tower was replaced by a new streamlined sail, but retained her original hull form.

Following this conversion, Sabalo alternated local operations with simulated war patrols while deployed to the western Pacific. The first deployment, from 26 December 1952 to 26 June 1953, was followed by a second from mid-November 1954 to 10 May 1955. Her third deployment, from 17 September to 4 November 1955, was conducted off the Territory of Alaska and among the eastern Aleutian Islands.

In September 1966, Sabalo's home port changed to San Diego, California, and she resumed training operations off the United States West Coast, primarily providing services to ships undergoing anti-submarine warfare, type, and refresher training. Sabalo served in that capacity as a unit of the United States First Fleet until decommissioned on 1 July 1971.

== Disposal ==
Struck from the Navy Register onn the day she was decommissioned, she was sunk as a target in SubSinkEx Project "Thurber" off San Diego on 21 February 1973. Some sources indicate that the sinking was by deliberate partial flooding to acquire acoustic data on submarine implosions.
