= USS Cochino =

Attack submarine

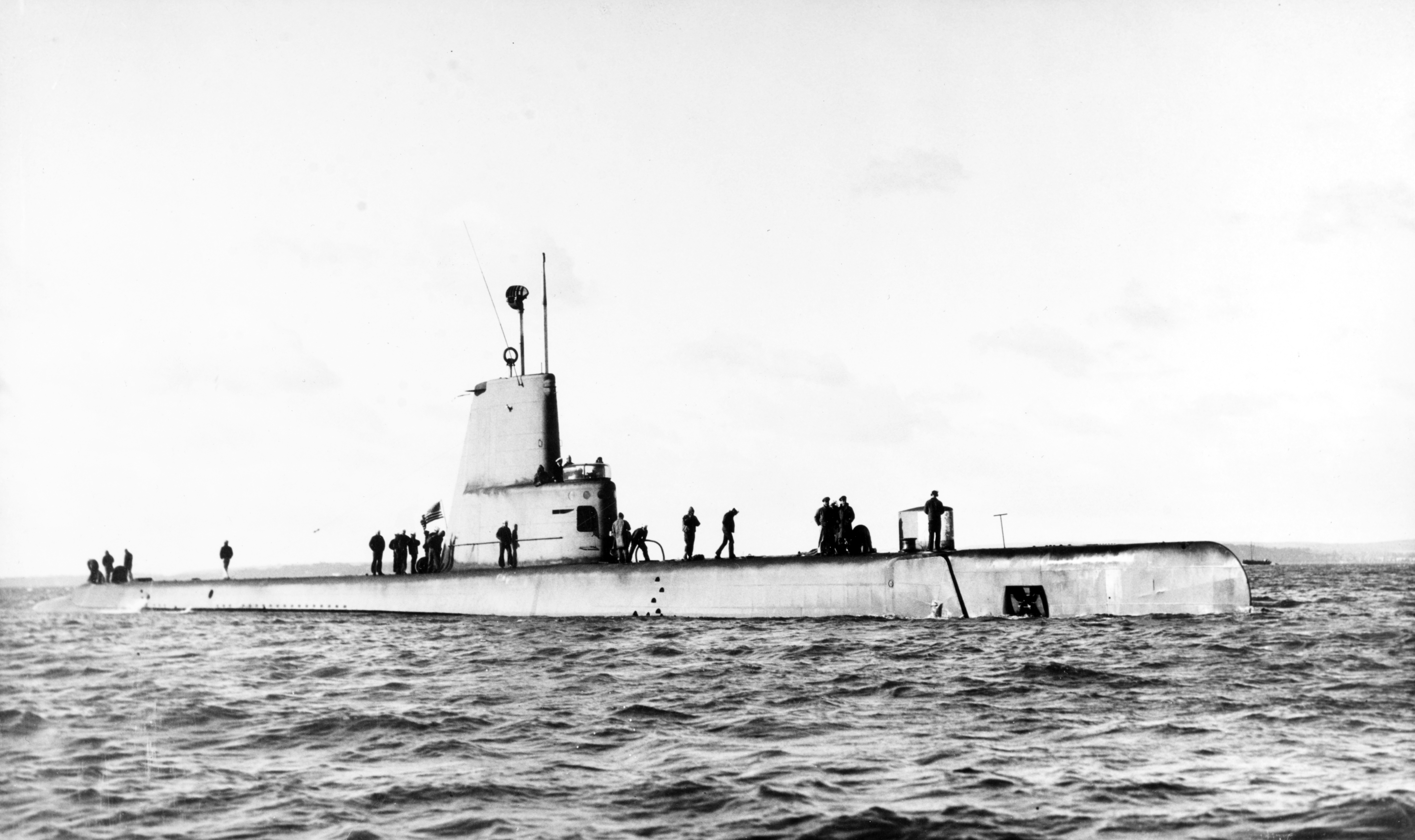
- USS Cochino (SS-345), leaving Portsmouth, England, for the Barents Sea, c. July 1949.

History

United States
- Name: Cochino
- Namesake: The Cuban name of triggerfish Balistes vetula
- Builder: Electric Boat Company, Groton, Connecticut
- Laid down: 13 April 1944
- Launched: 20 April 1945
- Commissioned: 25 August 1945
- Identification: Hull symbol: SS-345; Call sign: NJEG
- Fate: Lost at sea, 26 August 1949

General characteristics (As built)
- Class & type: Balao-class diesel-electric submarine
- Displacement: 1,526 long tons (1,550 t) surfaced; 2,424 long tons (2,463 t) submerged
- Length: 311 ft 9 in (95.02 m)
- Beam: 27 ft 3 in (8.31 m)
- Draft: 16 ft 10 in (5.13 m) maximum
- Propulsion: 4 × General Motors Model 16-278A V16 diesel engines driving electrical generators; 2 × 126-cell Sargo batteries; 4 × high-speed General Electric electric motors with reduction gears; 2 × propellers; 5,400 shp (4.0 MW) surfaced; 2,740 shp (2.0 MW) submerged
- Speed: 20.25 kn (37.50 km/h; 23.30 mph) surfaced; 8.75 kn (16.21 km/h; 10.07 mph) submerged
- Range: 11,000 nmi (13,000 mi; 20,000 km) surfaced at 10 kn (19 km/h; 12 mph)
- Endurance: 48 hours at 2 kn (3.7 km/h; 2.3 mph) submerged; 75 days on patrol
- Test depth: 400 feet (120 m)
- Complement: 10 officers, 70–71 enlisted
- Armament: 10 × 21-inch (533 mm) torpedo tubes; 6 forward, 4 aft; 24 torpedoes; 1 × 4-inch (102 mm) / 50 caliber deck gun; Bofors 40 mm and Oerlikon 20 mm cannon

General characteristics (Guppy II)
- Displacement: 1,870 long tons (1,900 t) surfaced; 2,440 long tons (2,480 t) submerged
- Length: 307 ft (94 m)
- Beam: 27 ft 4 in (8.33 m)
- Draft: 17 ft (5.2 m)
- Propulsion: Batteries upgraded to GUPPY type, capacity expanded to 504 cells (1 × 184 cell, 1 × 68 cell, and 2 × 126 cell batteries); 4 × high-speed electric motors replaced with 2 × low-speed direct drive electric motors
- Speed: Surfaced: 18 kn (33 km/h; 21 mph) maximum; 13.5 kn (25.0 km/h; 15.5 mph) cruising; Submerged: 16 kn (30 km/h; 18 mph) for ½ hour; 9 kn (17 km/h; 10 mph) snorkeling; 3.5 kn (6.5 km/h; 4.0 mph) cruising
- Range: 15,000 nmi (17,000 mi; 28,000 km) surfaced at 11 kn (20 km/h; 13 mph)
- Endurance: 48 hours at 4 kn (7.4 km/h; 4.6 mph) submerged
- Complement: 9–10 officers; 5 petty officers; 70 enlisted men
- Sensors & processing systems: WFA active sonar; JT passive sonar; Mk 106 torpedo fire control system
- Armament: 10 × 21 inch (533 mm) torpedo tubes (six forward, four aft)
- Notes: Snorkel added

USS Cochino (SS-345) was a Balao-class submarine in service with the United States Navy from 1945 to 1949. She sank after a battery explosion off Norway, on 26 August 1949. Cochino was named for the cochino, a triggerfish found in the Atlantic.

== Construction ==
Cochino was laid down by the Electric Boat Company, of Groton, Connecticut, on 13 April 1944. She was launched on 20 April 1945, sponsored by Mrs. M.E. Serat, the wife of the Assistant to the President of Electric Boat Co., and commissioned on 25 August 1945.

== Service history ==
During her shakedown cruise out of New London, Connecticut, Cochino visited Newport, Rhode Island, 12–15 September 1945, then sailed for the Panama Canal Zone, on 3 October. Reaching her destination on October 9, the new fleet boat carried out training with the Operational Development Force, then visited Miami, Florida, 24–30 October, to observe Navy Day. She then proceeded to Guantanamo Bay, Cuba, where Cochino operated in until 27 November, when she shaped a course back to New London.

Cochino sailed from New London, on 8 January 1946, in company with Irex, bound for Guantanamo Bay. Cochino provided services out of Naval Operating Base, Guantanamo, for much of January, clearing those waters on 25 January' for her new home port of Key West, Florida, arriving there on 27 January, after which time she returned to Guantanamo Bay, to resume providing services in that area from 24 February–7 March. In-port periods at Key West followed, 9 March–3 May and 7–10 May, punctuated by a call at St. Petersburg, Florida, 4–6 May, before she returned to Cuban waters 12–16 May. Then, following a visit to St. Thomas, Virgin Islands, 18–20 May, Cochino sailed to conduct simulated attacks upon ships of the 8th Fleet, proceeding then to Key West, upon conclusion of those evolutions.

Following a period of upkeep from 24 May–16 August 1946, Cochino operated briefly out of Guantanamo Bay, 18–24 August, before she returned to her home port. Then, sailing in company with Corporal, she visited Galveston, Texas, from 2–7 September. Returning to Key West, upon completion of that port call, Cochino returned to Guantanamo Bay, for another stint of providing services for fleet units in those waters, from 6–10 October. The boat operated out of Key West, for the remainder of the year, punctuating that time with visits to Havana, Cuba, from 18 to 21 October, and New Orleans, from 25 to 29 October, and providing services for the fleet out of Guantanamo Bay, from 1–6 December.

Cochino departed her home port on 3 March 1947, and visited St. Thomas, from 7–9 March, before sailing in company with Greenfish to operate north of Culebra, Puerto Rico. Following another in port period at Key West, from 17 to 29 March, Cochino headed north for a period of repairs and alterations at the Philadelphia Naval Shipyard. While there, she suffered slight damage when undocking from the marine railway on 20 May. Shifting to the Naval Ammunition Depot, at Fort Mifflin, upon completion of that yard period, she conducted deep diving tests on 21 June, in the waters of the Baltimore Canyon, at 38°08′N 73°49′W, tended by the submarine rescue vessel Tringa, after which time she returned to Philadelphia Naval Shipyard, remaining there until 3 July. Cochino then proceeded to Norfolk, Virginia, from 6–12 July, reporting for duty to Commander, Aircraft, Atlantic Fleet, and then shifted to Annapolis, Maryland, from 12 to 25 July, reporting for duty to the Superintendent of the Naval Academy, upon arrival there. She then returned to her home port for upkeep from 28 July–29 August, after which time she visited Havana, from 29 August–1 September. She returned to Key West, on 1 October, where she remained for most of the month, heading out to sea on 11 October, to ride out a storm, returning the following day.

After visiting Miami, from 25 to 28 October 1947, Cochino operated with the 2nd Task Fleet near Bermuda, through mid-November, after which time she returned to her homeport for upkeep through mid-January 1948. Work in the Key West operating area or upkeep in port involved the boat until 31 January, when she sailed for New Orleans, for Mardi Gras festivities, from 2–11 February. She then returned to Key West, and the local operating areas there, the fleet boat worked in those areas into the spring of 1948. Toward the end of that period, on 26 April 1948, while conducting a submerged exercise at a 60 ft (18 m) depth, Cochino collided with the fleet tug Salinan. Attempts to go deep and swing the ship proved unsuccessful, and the boat suffered damage to the periscope shears, both periscopes, and her radar antenna.

Cochino then underwent repairs and major renovations at her builders' yard beginning on 11 May 1948. Converted to a GUPPY/Snorkel boat at Groton, she emerged from the yard on 4 February 1949. Departing New London, on 25 March, the newly modernized submarine visited Boston, from 26 to 27 March, then returned to New London, from 28 March–2 May, after which time she headed south to return to her home port, arriving at Key West, on 8 May. She then again shaped a course for New London, where she remained from 19 May until 16 July, then proceeded to Argentia, Newfoundland, where she arrived on 22 July, en route to the British Isles and her first deployment to European waters.

She reached Derry, Northern Ireland, on 29 July. She operated locally in those waters for a brief period, then put in to Derry, from 4–8 August, before visiting Portsmouth, England, from 8–12 August. She then put to sea for operations above the Arctic Circle in the Barents Sea before turning for home in late August.

In August 1949, Cochino and Tusk sailed along the Kola Peninsula to determine whether the Soviet Union had detonated an atomic bomb.

On 25 August 1949, Cochino ran into a violent polar storm off Norway. The huge waves slammed the submarine's snorkel so violently, and jolted the boat so severely, that the pounding caused an electrical fire and battery explosion, followed by the release of deadly hydrogen gas. In wretched weather conditions, men of Cochino and Tusk fought to save the submarine for 14 hours. A second battery explosion on 26 August prompted an "Abandon Ship" order, and after the crew made a dangerous rope transfer to Tusk, the abandoned Cochino sank at 71°35′N 23°35′E. Cochino's only fatality was a civilian from the Bureau of Ships, technician Robert W. Philo, swept overboard by an icy wave. Tusk lost six of her own men in the same manner.

Cochino was stricken from the List of Naval Vessels on 27 October 1949.

Cochino is one of four United States Navy submarines to be lost since the end of World War II. The others are USS Stickleback, USS Thresher and USS Scorpion.

== Bibliography ==
- Cressman, Robert J. (21 April 2016). "Cochino (SS-345)". Naval History and Heritage Command.
- Friedman, Norman (1995). U.S. Submarines Through 1945: An Illustrated Design History. Annapolis, Maryland: United States Naval Institute. ISBN 1-55750-263-3.
- Friedman, Norman (1994). U.S. Submarines Since 1945: An Illustrated Design History. Annapolis, Maryland: United States Naval Institute. ISBN 1-55750-260-9.
- Bauer, K. Jack; Roberts, Stephen S. (1991). Register of Ships of the U.S. Navy, 1775-1990: Major Combatants. Westport, Connecticut: Greenwood Press. ISBN 0-313-26202-0.
