= USS Carbonero =

Submarine of the United States

Coordinates: 4°35′N 103°30′E

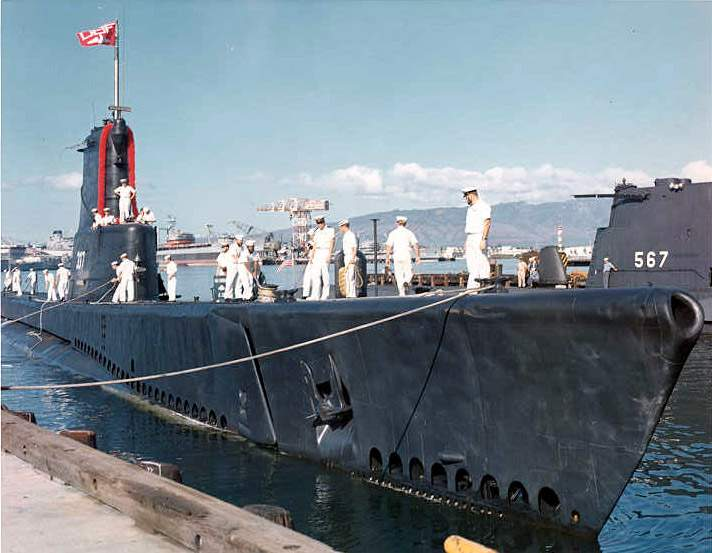
- USS Carbonero (SS-337) about to tie up inboard of USS Gudgeon (SS-567) at Pearl Harbor, c. 1963.

History

United States
- Ordered: 10 April 1942
- Builder: Electric Boat Company, Groton, Connecticut
- Laid down: 16 December 1943
- Launched: 15 October 1944
- Commissioned: 7 February 1945
- Decommissioned: 1 December 1970
- Stricken: 1 December 1970
- Fate: Sunk as a target off Pearl Harbor, 27 April 1975

General characteristics
- Class & type: Balao-class diesel-electric submarine
- Displacement: 1,526 long tons (1,550 t) surfaced; 2,424 long tons (2,463 t) submerged
- Length: 311 ft 9 in (95.02 m)
- Beam: 27 ft 3 in (8.31 m)
- Draft: 16 ft 10 in (5.13 m) maximum
- Propulsion: 4 × General Motors Model 16-278A V16 diesel engines driving electrical generators; 2 × 126-cell Sargo batteries; 4 × high-speed General Electric electric motors with reduction gears; 2 × propellers; 5,400 shp (4.0 MW) surfaced; 2,740 shp (2.0 MW) submerged
- Speed: 20.25 knots (37.50 km/h; 23.30 mph) surfaced; 8.75 knots (16.21 km/h; 10.07 mph) submerged
- Range: 11,000 nmi (20,000 km; 13,000 mi) surfaced at 10 knots (19 km/h; 12 mph)
- Endurance: 48 hours at 2 kn (3.7 km/h; 2.3 mph) submerged; 75 days on patrol
- Test depth: 400 ft (120 m)
- Complement: 10 officers, 70–71 enlisted
- Armament: 10 × 21-inch (533 mm) torpedo tubes; 6 forward, 4 aft; 24 torpedoes; 1 × 4-inch (102 mm) / 50 caliber deck gun; Bofors 40 mm and Oerlikon 20 mm cannon

USS Carbonero (SS/AGSS-337) was a Balao-class submarine, the first ship of the United States Navy to be named for the carbonero, a salt-water fish found in the West Indies.

== Construction and commissioning ==
Carbonero′s keel was laid down on 16 December 1943 by the Electric Boat Company of Groton, Connecticut. She was launched on 19 October 1944, sponsored by Mrs. S.S. Murray, and commissioned on 7 February 1945.

== World War II ==
Sailing from New London, Connecticut, on 21 March 1945, Carbonero served with the Fleet Sonar School at Key West, Florida, and conducted torpedo exercises at Balboa, Canal Zone, before arriving at Pearl Harbor on 9 May. Her first war patrol, conducted off Formosa from 26 May to 8 July, was devoted to lifeguard duty, standing by for possible rescue of aviators downed in aircraft carrier strikes. After refitting at Subic Bay, Carbonero cleared for the Gulf of Siam on 4 August, and cruising off the east coast of the Malay Peninsula, sank four schooners, two sampans, and two junks, some of the small remnants of the Japanese merchant fleet. This second war patrol ended with the cease fire order on 15 August, and Carbonero put back to Subic Bay.

== 1945–1962 ==
Carbonero reported at Seattle on 22 September 1945 for operations on the West Coast. After a simulated war patrol to the Far East early in 1947, she was assigned to the Submarine Guided Missile Program, joining her sister ship Cusk as a control vessel operating out of San Diego, and Naval Base Ventura County in Port Hueneme, California. Assigned to the Regulus missile program, Carbonero was re-designated an auxiliary submarine (AGSS-337) in 1949.

Fitted with the Fleet Snorkel modification package in 1951, Carbonero operated off Southern California, and occasionally in the Hawaiian Islands. In 1953 Carbonero was fitted with control equipment which enabled her to guide a missile once it passed beyond the range of the firing ship. She performed in various phases of this program including the launching of Loon missiles and the evaluation of Regulus missile guidance equipment.

On 13 May 1957, her home port shifted to Pearl Harbor. In July 1959, Carbonero became the flagship of Submarine Division 12. From that time forward Carbonero took part in local operations in Hawaiian waters plus deployments to the Western Pacific, trips to the South Pacific and mainland United States. She made an Arctic familiarization cruise in 1957, and in 1958 and 1959–1960, cruised to the Far East. She assisted in the training of forces of the Republic of Korea and of Japan, and called at ports of Japan and the Philippines during these deployments.

Early in 1962 the Regulus missile guidance equipment was removed. Carbonero returned to the standard "Fleet Snorkel" configuration, and was re-designated an attack submarine (SS-337).

== 1962–1970 ==
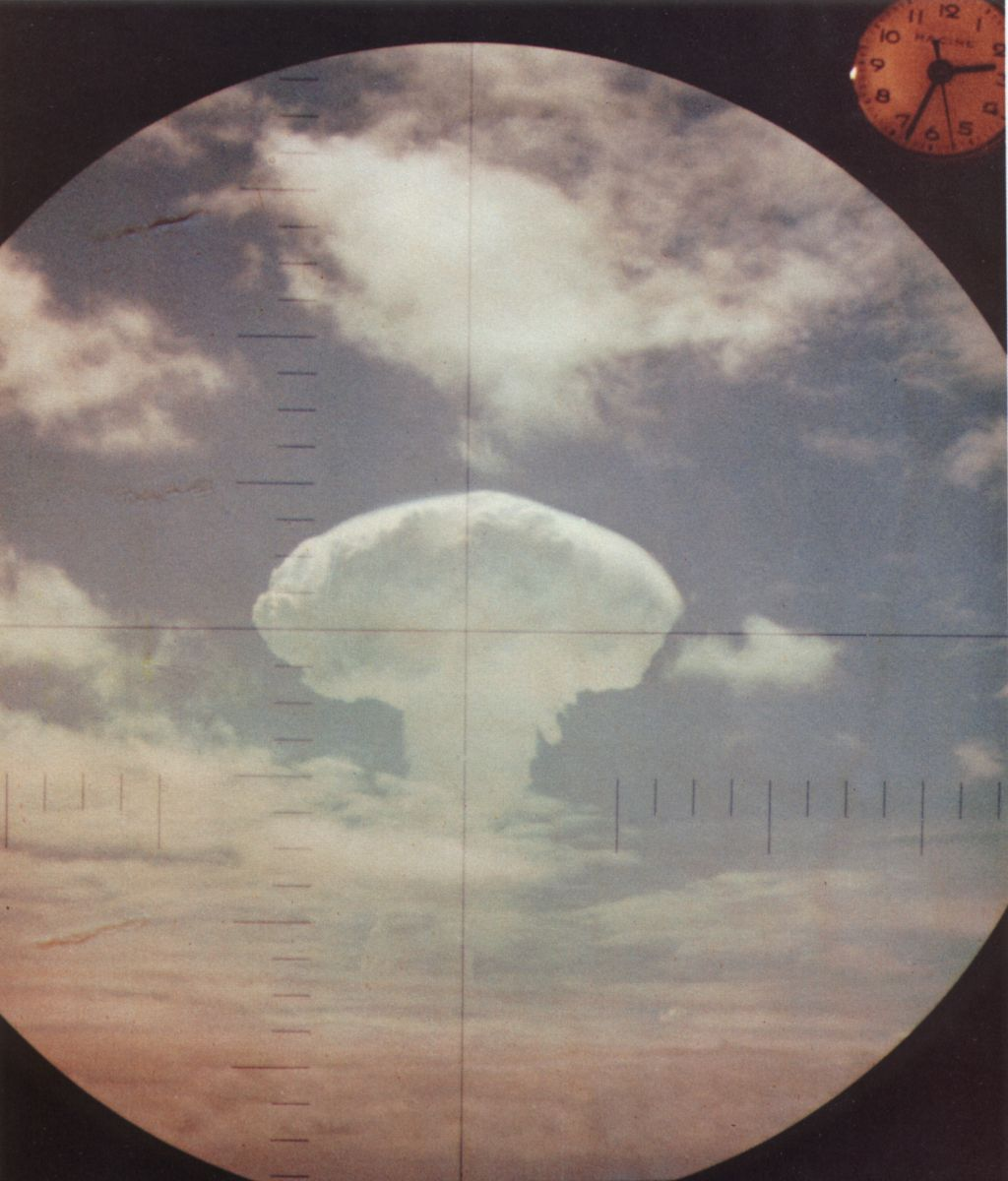
Shot Frigate Bird, 600 kilotons of TNT (2,500 TJ), as viewed from the submarine USS Carbonero. Only full-scale US test of a strategic missile system.

Carbonero participated in the 1962 nuclear tests in the Central Pacific off Christmas Island and Johnston Island entitled Operation Dominic. She was on hand for the detonation of a warhead from a Polaris missile fired from Ethan Allen in the "Frigate Bird" nuclear weapon test. Carbonero and Medregal were about 30 miles (48 km) from the detonation.

During the Vietnam War Carbonero again performed aviator lifeguard duties during trips to the Far East. During the mid 1960s while operating off Kaena Point, Oahu, Carbonero ran aground at a depth of 250 feet (76 m), requiring drydock repair at Pearl Harbor Naval Shipyard.

Carbonero also participated in the Project SHAD biological tests 65-6 Big Tom, 66-13 Half Note, and 68-71 Folded Arrow. During these tests, Bacillus globigii was released from Carbonero using a submarine-biological-disseminator. Aerosol sampling was done at various land-based stations near Oahu, Hawaii and Kaneohe Marine Corps Air Station.

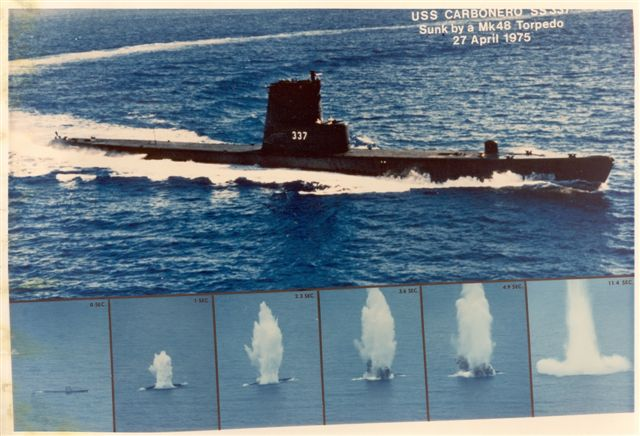
Montage of the end of Carbonero; sunk as a target by USS Pogy firing a Mk 48 torpedo off Pearl Harbor on 27 April 1975

Carbonero was decommissioned on 1 December 1970. On 27 April 1975, she was taken to sea for one last time and used as a test target for a Mark 48 torpedo fired by the submarine USS Pogy off Hawaii.

== Honors and awards ==
- Asiatic-Pacific Campaign Medal with one battle star
- World War II Victory Medal
- China Service Medal
- National Defense Service Medal with one service star
- Vietnam Service Medal with two service stars
- Vietnam Cross of Gallantry (Republic of Vietnam)
- Republic of Vietnam Campaign Medal (Republic of Vietnam)

One of Carbonero′s two war patrols was designated as "successful."
