= USS Tusk =

Submarine of the United States

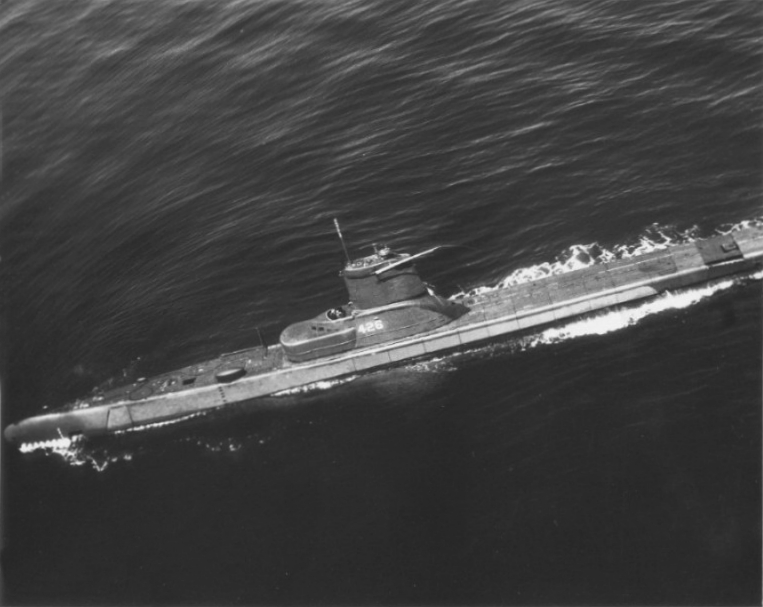
- Tusk, after the GUPPY II conversion

History

United States
- Name: USS Tusk
- Builder: Cramp Shipbuilding Company, Philadelphia
- Yard number: 560
- Laid down: 23 August 1943
- Launched: 8 July 1945
- Commissioned: 11 April 1946
- Decommissioned: 18 October 1973
- Stricken: 18 October 1973
- Identification: SS-426
- Fate: Transferred to the Republic of China, 18 October 1973

Republic of China
- Name: ROCS Hai Pao
- Acquired: 18 October 1973
- Identification: SS-792
- Status: Afloat at Tsoying Naval Base, Kaohsiung as of November 2020

General characteristics (As completed)
- Class & type: Balao-class diesel-electric submarine
- Displacement: 1,526 long tons (1,550 t) surfaced; 2,424 long tons (2,463 t) submerged
- Length: 311 ft 9 in (95.02 m)
- Beam: 27 ft 3 in (8.31 m)
- Draft: 16 ft 10 in (5.13 m) maximum
- Propulsion: 4 × Fairbanks-Morse Model 38D8-⅛ 10-cylinder opposed piston diesel engines driving electrical generators; 2 × 126-cell Sargo batteries; 2 × low-speed direct-drive Elliott electric motors; two propellers; 5,400 shp (4.0 MW) surfaced; 2,740 shp (2.0 MW) submerged
- Speed: 20.25 knots (37.50 km/h) surfaced; 8.75 knots (16.21 km/h) submerged
- Range: 11,000 nautical miles (20,000 km) surfaced at 10 knots (19 km/h)
- Endurance: 48 hours at 2 knots (3.7 km/h) submerged; 75 days on patrol
- Test depth: 400 feet (120 m)
- Complement: 10 officers, 70–71 enlisted
- Armament: 10 × 21-inch (533 mm) torpedo tubes; 6 forward, 4 aft; 24 torpedoes; 1 × 5-inch (127 mm) / 25 caliber deck gun; Bofors 40 mm and Oerlikon 20 mm cannon

General characteristics (Guppy II)
- Class & type: GUPPY II
- Displacement: 1,870 long tons (1,900 t) surfaced; 2,440 long tons (2,480 t) submerged
- Length: 307 ft (94 m)
- Beam: 27 ft 4 in (8.33 m)
- Draft: 17 ft (5.2 m)
- Propulsion: Snorkel added; Batteries upgraded to GUPPY type, capacity expanded to 504 cells (1 × 184 cell, 1 × 68 cell, and 2 × 126 cell batteries)
- Speed: Surfaced: 18.0 knots (33.3 km/h) maximum; 13.5 knots (25.0 km/h) cruising; Submerged: 16.0 knots (29.6 km/h) for ½ hour; 9.0 knots (16.7 km/h) snorkeling; 3.5 knots (6.5 km/h) cruising
- Range: 15,000 nmi (28,000 km) surfaced at 11 knots (20 km/h)
- Endurance: 48 hours at 4 knots (7.4 km/h) submerged
- Complement: 9–10 officers; 5 petty officers; 70 enlisted men
- Sensors & processing systems: WFA active sonar; JT passive sonar; Mk 106 torpedo fire control system
- Armament: 10 × 21 inch (533 mm) torpedo tubes; (six forward, four aft); all guns removed

USS Tusk (SS-426), a Balao-class submarine, was the only ship of the United States Navy to be named for the tusk, an alternate name for the cusk, a large edible saltwater fish related to the cod. Her keel was laid down on 23 August 1943 at Philadelphia by the Cramp Shipbuilding Company. She was launched on 8 July 1945 sponsored by Mrs. Carolyn Park Mills, and commissioned on 11 April 1946.

Tusk and Trumpetfish are erroneously listed with the Tench class in some sources, as their hull numbers are in the sequence assigned to that class.

== Shakedown and GUPPY Conversion ==
Tusk completed her shakedown cruise in the southern Atlantic with a round of goodwill visits to Latin American ports. She called at Rio de Janeiro and Bahia in Brazil, Curaçao in the Netherlands West Indies, and at Colón in the Panama Canal Zone before returning to New London, Connecticut, in June. For the next year, she conducted operations along the East Coast between New London and Wilmington, North Carolina. During the first month of 1947, Tusk participated in a fleet tactical exercise in the Central Atlantic. A three-month overhaul at Philadelphia, followed by oceanographic work along the Atlantic shelf in conjunction with Columbia University and the Woods Hole Oceanographic Institution occupied her until October 1947 when she entered the Portsmouth Naval Shipyard for a Greater Underwater Propulsive Power Program (GUPPY) conversion.

Over the next seven months, Tusk received extensive modifications to improve her submerged performance characteristics. Four "greater capacity" batteries replaced her old larger ones. Her hull became more streamlined—the anchors were recessed into the hull and the propeller guards were removed—to improve her overall hydrodynamic design for underwater operations. Her sail was streamlined and enlarged to house the snorkel, a device added to allow her to operate on diesel power at periscope depth and to recharge her batteries while running submerged. All of these changes helped to convert Tusk from simply a submersible surface ship into a truer submarine. They increased her submerged range; and, though she lost about two knots in surface speed, her submerged speed increased from just under 10 knots (19 km/h) to about 15 knots (28 km/h).

The newly converted submarine returned to active duty early in the summer of 1948. She conducted her shakedown training and made a simulated war patrol to the Panama Canal Zone in June and July. She returned to the United States in August and visited the United States Naval Academy at Annapolis, Maryland, where her presence allowed about 1000 fourth-classmen to see at firsthand the latest development in submarine design. That fall and winter, Tusk resumed normal operations, participating in exercises with other United States and NATO forces. She ranged from the Caribbean Sea in the south to above the Arctic Circle in the north. The beginning of 1949 brought a more restricted radius of operations. During the first six months of that year, she served with Submarine Development Group 2 based at Newport, Rhode Island. In July, Tusk rejoined the multinational forces of NATO for another round of exercises in the North Atlantic. During these exercises, she visited Derry, Northern Ireland, and Portsmouth, England.

== Loss of Cochino ==
During the final phase of those exercises, Tusk was operating in a unit which also included the submarine Cochino. On 25 August, while steaming through a gale off the coast of Norway, Cochino suffered an explosion in one of her batteries. Tusk rushed to the aid of the stricken submarine, providing medical supplies for Cochino's injured by way of life rafts. One such raft capsized in heavy seas sending a Cochino officer and a civilian employee of the Bureau of Ships into the icy Arctic Sea. Both were recovered, but during the administration of artificial respiration on board Tusk, another wave broke over her deck washing away the civilian and 11 Tusk crewmen. Only four sailors were subsequently rescued. After those tragic events, Tusk and the limping Cochino headed for Hammerfest, Norway. Along the way, another explosion erupted in Cochino's aft battery. The second detonation sealed Cochino's fate. Water poured through her battered hull. Tusk came alongside in heavy seas and lashed herself to the sinking submarine. Under the worst possible conditions, Tusk took all of Cochino's crew off safely. Minutes later Cochino took her final plunge and Tusk headed for Hammerfest.

== 1950s ==
That fall, the submarine returned to the United States to resume East Coast operations out of New London in support of the Submarine School. She made cruises north to Halifax, Nova Scotia, and south to Bermuda. Her duty with the Submarine School continued until the middle of 1951 when she was assigned once more to Submarine Development Group 2. That assignment, punctuated by regular exercises with the fleet, continued until the summer of 1952 when she returned to an operational unit, Submarine Squadron (SubRon) 10. Normal East Coast duty out of New London lasted until late in the year at which time Tusk was deployed to the Mediterranean Sea for a six-month tour with the Sixth Fleet. Her return to the United States early in the summer of 1953 brought more local operations out of New London. During the first part of 1954, the submarine operated in the Caribbean. Then, after four months of local operations out of New London, she sailed for northern European waters. That tour brought port visits to Belfast, Northern Ireland, and Glasgow, Scotland, as well as training exercises with NATO forces in the northern Atlantic.

The first four years of the 1950s established the pattern for the remainder of Tusk's Navy career. She saw four additional Mediterranean deployments between 1954 and 1973. Initially, however, a long stretch of East Coast operations intervened between overseas deployments. Six years elapsed between her 1954 northern Europe assignment and her second Mediterranean cruise late in 1960. The fall of 1961 brought another round of NATO exercises followed by joint American-Canadian training operations in the western Atlantic. Another three-year period of New London-based local operations occurred before she was deployed again to Europe in the fall of 1964 for more NATO training. During the spring and summer of 1966, Tusk returned to the Mediterranean for her third tour of duty with the Sixth Fleet. Late 1966 brought a resumption of duty in American coastal waters which lasted until early 1967. During the summer of 1967, the submarine returned to northern European waters, visiting several ports and participating in yet another series of multinational NATO exercises. That November, she joined in binational American-Canadian exercises in the western Atlantic before resuming her East Coast routine. Throughout 1968 and during the first half of 1969, the ship continued New London based operations, including services to nuclear-powered submarines Jack and Lafayette. In July, she made her fourth deployment to the Mediterranean, returning to East Coast operations in October.

== Decommissioning and transfer ==
After almost three years of that New London-based routine, including an overhaul at the Charleston Navy Yard from July to December 1971, Tusk set out for her fifth and final tour of duty with the Sixth Fleet. She concluded that cruise the following October. The submarine rounded out the final year of her career with normal operations along the eastern seaboard, primarily in the New England vicinity. On 18 October 1973, Tusk was decommissioned at New London, Connecticut, struck from the Naval Vessel Register, and on 18 October 1973 transferred, by sale, to the Republic of China (Taiwan).

Ex-Tusk was commissioned into the Republic of China Navy as Hai Pao (meaning "seal"), first with hull number SS-92, then SS-794, and finally SS-792. The terms of the purchase specified that she be used strictly for ASW training, so her torpedo tubes were welded shut before the transfer. The Taiwanese restored the torpedo tubes in 1976 and reportedly received modern torpedoes through Italy from a number of sources. The boat is reportedly allowed only to operate in sea shallower than 100m. As of November 2020, Hai Pao was still afloat at Tsoying Naval Base, Kaohsiung.
