= USS Cusk =

Submarine of the United States

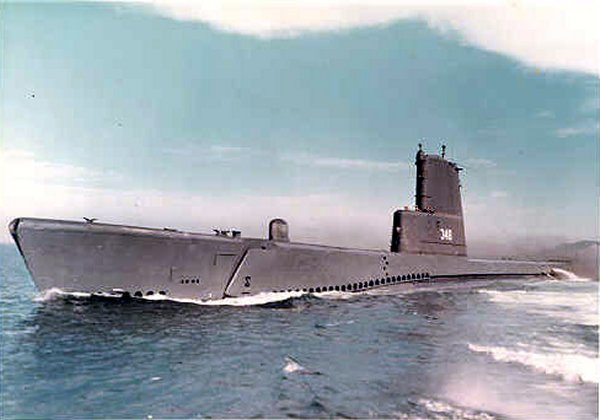
- Cusk (SS-348) underway, late 1950s.

History

United States
- Builder: Electric Boat Company, Groton, Connecticut
- Laid down: 25 May 1944
- Launched: 28 July 1945
- Commissioned: 5 February 1946
- Decommissioned: 24 September 1969
- Stricken: 24 September 1969
- Fate: Sold for scrap, 26 June 1972

General characteristics
- Class & type: Balao class diesel-electric submarine
- Displacement: 1,526 tons (1,550 t) surfaced; 2,424 tons (2,463 t) submerged
- Length: 311 ft 9 in (95.02 m)
- Beam: 27 ft 3 in (8.31 m)
- Draft: 16 ft 10 in (5.13 m) maximum
- Propulsion: 4 × General Motors Model 16-278A V16 diesel engines driving electrical generators; 2 × 126-cell Sargo batteries; 4 × high-speed General Electric electric motors with reduction gears; 2 × propellers; 5,400 shp (4.0 MW) surfaced; 2,740 shp (2.0 MW) submerged
- Speed: 20.25 knots (38 km/h) surfaced; 8.75 knots (16 km/h) submerged
- Range: 11,000 nautical miles (20,000 km) surfaced at 10 knots (19 km/h)
- Endurance: 48 hours at 2 knots (3.7 km/h) submerged; 75 days on patrol
- Test depth: 400 ft (120 m)
- Complement: 10 officers, 70–71 enlisted
- Armament: 10 × 21-inch (533 mm) torpedo tubes; 6 forward, 4 aft; 24 torpedoes; 1 × 5-inch (127 mm) / 25 caliber deck gun; Bofors 40 mm and Oerlikon 20 mm cannon

USS Cusk (SS/SSG/AGSS-348) was a Balao-class submarine of the United States Navy named for the cusk, a large food fish related to the cod.

== History ==
Cusk was launched 28 July 1945 by Electric Boat, Groton, Conn.; cosponsored by Mrs. C. S. Gillette, and Mrs. W. G. Reed; and commissioned 5 February 1946.

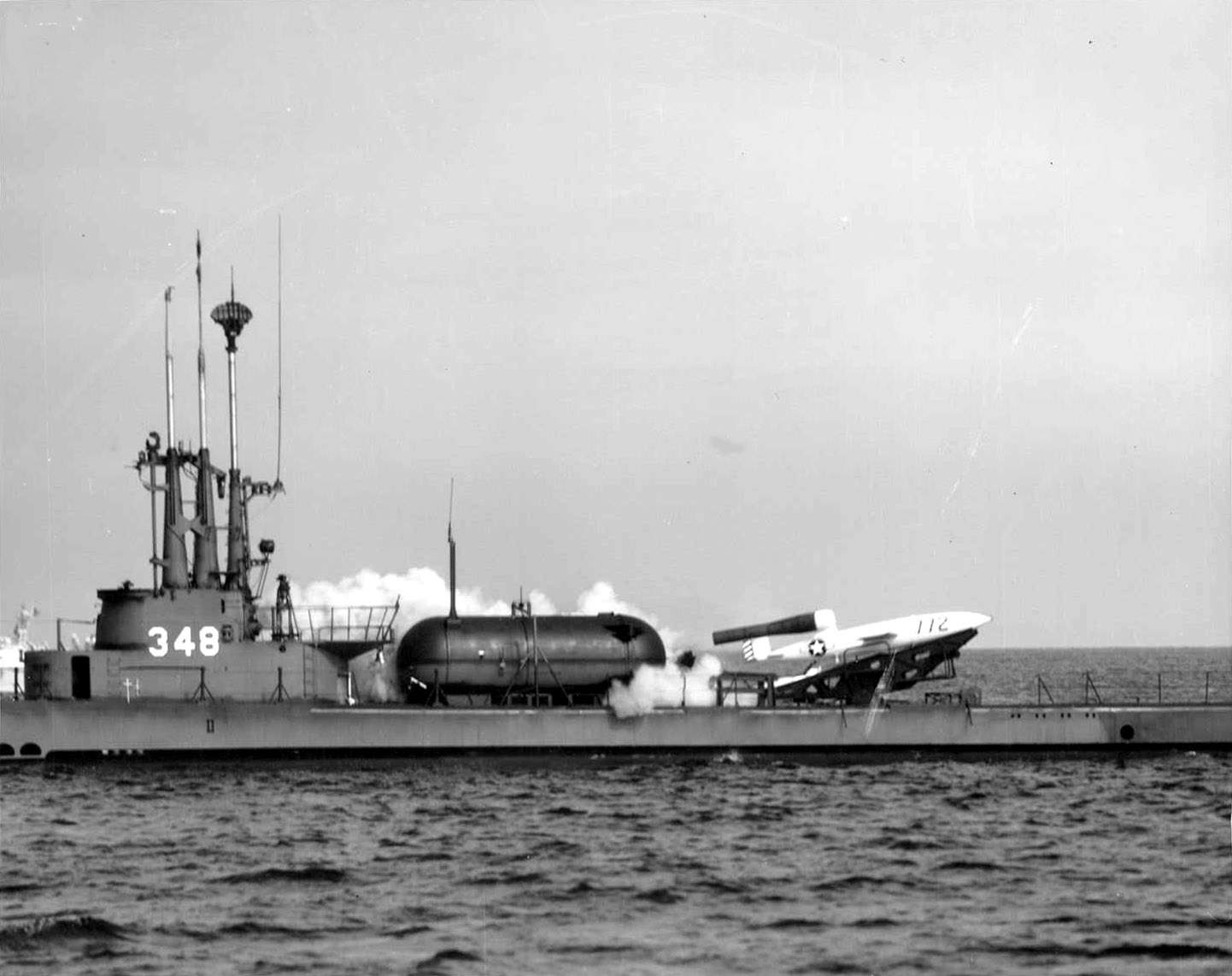
Cusk fires an experimental RB-2 Loon missile

Departing New London 24 April 1946, Cusk made an extended cruise through the Caribbean Sea, and arrived at San Diego 6 June 1946. She sailed to Alaska and northern waters between 16 July and 20 August, then carried out local operations out of San Diego. A pioneer in the missile field, Cusk was fitted with a missile hangar and launching ramp just aft of her sail in 1947. She was designated SSG-348, 20 January 1948 and was the first submarine to launch a guided missile (a Republic-Ford JB-2 Loon, derived from the German V-1 flying bomb) from her own deck, a forerunner of the cruise missile and ballistic missile submarines of the future.

She entered Mare Island Naval Shipyard for a "Fleet Snorkel" conversion and modernization in 1954, but remained in the Regulus missile program because of her special guidance equipment, although redesignated SS-348 on 1 July 1954.

Cusk arrived at Pearl Harbor, her new home port, 13 May 1957. Continuing her missile guidance duties with consorts Tunny (SSG-282), and Carbonero (SS-337) she operated in Hawaiian waters with a cruise to San Diego in 1957 and duty in the Far East in 1958 and 1960.

In the fall of 1961 Cusk had her Regulus missile guidance equipment removed and reverted to attack submarine profile. After successfully shooting a MK 14 Mod 3 warshot torpedo at the target cliffs on Kahoolawe Island she departed for WesPac in January 1962. Designated as the SubFlot 7 Mining platform during the deployment, Cusk offloaded all steam torpedoes at Cubi Point NAS that spring and reloaded 4 MK 27 Mobile drill mines and 18 MK 10 moored drill mines. 12 days after departure from Subic Bay, Cusk entered the shallow waters of Buckner Bay Okinawa submerged, launched the 4 MK 27 mobile mines and then planted a field of 18 MK 10 moored mines. Following the successful mine plant Cusk returned to Subic Bay RP, and retrieved her MK 14 Mod 3 warshot torpedoes.

In June 1969, the Secretary of Defense ordered that 100 of the Navy's oldest ships be decommissioned; the Cusk was on that list. Subsequently, the Cusk was redesignated AGSS-348 and she set sail for the last time in September 1969 for Hunter's Point Naval Shipyard in San Francisco.

Cusk was decommissioned and simultaneously struck from the Naval Register, 24 September 1969; she was sold for scrap, 26 June 1972.

== Awards ==
- World War II Victory Medal
- National Defense Service Medal with star

== See also ==
- The Flying Missile
