= USS Sablefish =

Submarine of the United States

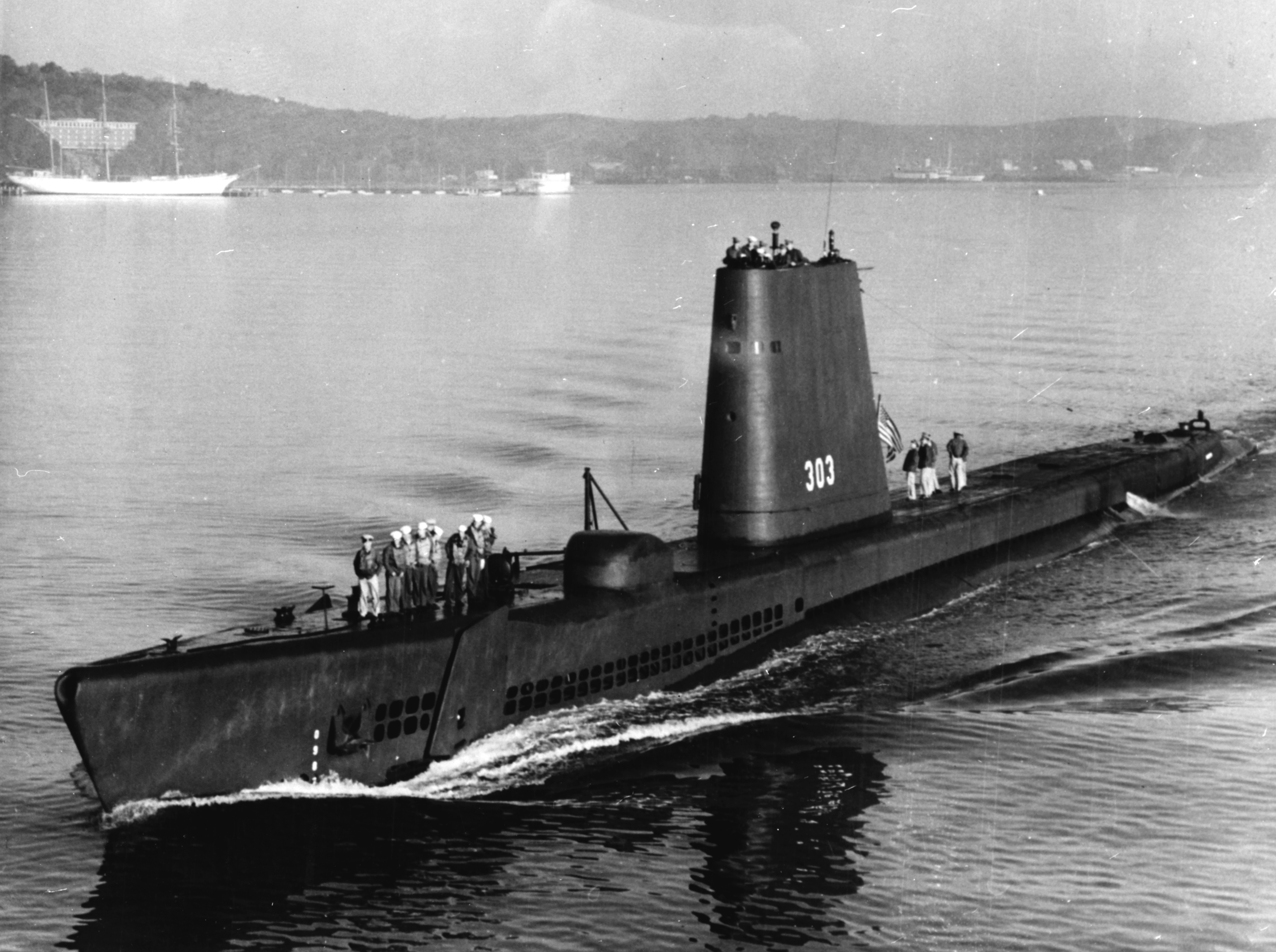
- USS Sablefish

History

United States
- Name: Sablefish
- Namesake: Sablefish
- Builder: Cramp Shipbuilding Co., Philadelphia
- Yard number: 558
- Laid down: 5 June 1943
- Launched: 4 June 1944
- Sponsored by: Mrs. Carol S. Burrough
- Commissioned: 18 December 1945
- Decommissioned: 1 November 1969
- Stricken: 1 November 1969
- Fate: Sold for scrap, 29 July 1971

General characteristics
- Class & type: Balao-class diesel-electric submarine
- Displacement: 1,526 tons (1,550 t) surfaced; 2,424 tons (2,463 t) submerged
- Length: 311 ft 8 in (95.00 m)
- Beam: 27 ft 3 in (8.31 m)
- Draft: 16 ft 10 in (5.13 m) maximum
- Propulsion: 4 × Fairbanks-Morse Model 38D8-1/8 9-cylinder opposed-piston diesel engines driving electrical generators; 2 × 126-cell Sargo batteries; 4 × high-speed Elliott electric motors with reduction gears; 2 × propellers; 5,400 shp (4.0 MW) surfaced; 2,740 shp (2.04 MW) submerged
- Speed: 20.25 knots (38 km/h) surfaced; 8.75 knots (16 km/h) submerged
- Range: 11,000 nautical miles (20,000 km) surfaced at 10 knots (19 km/h)
- Endurance: 48 hours at 2 knots (3.7 km/h) submerged; 75 days on patrol
- Test depth: 400 ft (120 m)
- Complement: 10 officers, 70–71 enlisted
- Armament: 10 × 21-inch (533 mm) torpedo tubes; 6 forward, 4 aft; 24 torpedoes; 1 × 5-inch (127 mm) / 25 caliber deck gun; Bofors 40 mm and Oerlikon 20 mm cannon

USS Sablefish (SS/AGSS-303), a Balao-class submarine, was a ship of the United States Navy named for the sablefish, a large, dark fish found along North America's Pacific coast from California to Alaska.

== Construction and commissioning ==
Sablefish was laid down on 5 June 1943 by the Cramp Shipbuilding Company at their site in Philadelphia, Pennsylvania. She was launched on 4 June 1944, sponsored by Mrs. Carol S. Burrough, wife of Captain Edmund W. Burrough, the former commanding officer of the light cruiser USS Cleveland (CL-55). Sablefish was commissioned at the Philadelphia Navy Yard in Philadelphia on 18 December 1945.

== Service history ==
Following a shakedown cruise from Naval Submarine Base New London in New London, Connecticut, to Balboa, Panama Canal Zone, Sablefish conducted type training in the Panama area until mid-May 1946. She then returned to her home port, New London, and spent the remainder of 1946 supporting antisubmarine warfare exercises off the United States East Coast, participating in fleet exercises off Bermuda, and making a three-week cruise off Greenland.

Sablefish′s duty in 1946 established a pattern for her operations during much of her subsequent career. Highlights of her service for the next few years included testing a new type of submarine escape buoy in January 1948 and again in September 1948; participating in ceremonies at Havana, Cuba, on 14 February 1948, the 50th anniversary of the sinking of the battleship Maine; conversion to a Fleet Snorkel submarine during the first half of 1951; and a starring role in one of Edward R. Murrow's See It Now television shows.

On 15 July 1952, Sablefish broadened her experience by departing New London and proceeding to the Mediterranean Sea for her first deployment with the United States Sixth Fleet. After exercises with other U.S. warships and vessels of the navies of North Atlantic Treaty Organization (NATO) allies during the rest of the summer, Sablefish returned to New London in October 1952. Thereafter, she made six more deployments to the Mediterranean.

When operating on the western side of the Atlantic Ocean, Sablefish was busy with exercises which took her as far north as Nova Scotia, Canada, and south to the Caribbean.

In June 1959, Sablefish was one of the U.S. Navy's representatives at the opening of the St. Lawrence Seaway in Canada, and she operated in the Great Lakes until mid-August 1959. A second cruise up the St. Lawrence River returned her to the Great Lakes in 1961.

In May 1967, Sablefish again headed east across the Atlantic, but this time, instead of transiting the Straits of Gibraltar for service with the Sixth Fleet in the Mediterranean, she visited ports in the British Isles and along the Atlantic coast of Europe in France, West Germany, Denmark, and Sweden. On her homeward voyage, she also stopped at Iceland.

Sablefish began her last Mediterranean deployment in the fall of 1968 and returned to New London on 1 February 1969. On 30 June 1969, while operating from New London, she was reclassified as an "auxiliary submarine" and accordingly redesignated AGSS-303.

== Decommissioning and disposal ==
Sablefish was decommissioned at New London on 1 November 1969 and struck from the Navy list the same day. She was subsequently stripped, then sold for scrap on 29 July 1971.

== Awards ==
- American Campaign Medal
- World War II Victory Medal
- National Defense Service Medal with star
