= List of submarines of the Turkish Navy =

This is a list of Turkish Navy submarines that have served from 10 July 1920 to present.

== Birinci İnönü class ==
(Germany) German Type UB III submarine:

Name	Builder	Launched	Commissioned	Fate
Birinci İnönü	(Netherlands) IvS, Fijenoord	29 January 1927	9 June 1928	Decommissioned 1948
İkinci İnönü	(Netherlands) IvS, Fijenoord	12 March 1927	9 June 1928	Decommissioned 1948

== Dumlupınar ==
version of (Italy) Italian Vettor Pisani-class submarine

Name	Builder	Launched	Commissioned	Fate
Dumlupınar	(Italy) CRDA, Monfalcone	4 March 1931	6 November 1931	Decommissioned 1949

== Sakarya ==
version of (Italy) Italian Argonauta-class submarine

Name	Builder	Launched	Commissioned	Fate
Sakarya	(Italy) CRDA, Monfalcone	5 February 1931	6 November 1931	Decommissioned 1949

== Gür ==
(Germany) German Type IA submarine

Name	Builder	Launched	Commissioned	Fate
Gür	(Spain) Echevarrieta y Larrinaga, Cádiz	22 October 1930	29 December 1936	Decommissioned 1947

== Ay class ==
Ay-class (version of (Germany) German Type IX submarine):

Name	Builder	Launched	Commissioned	Fate
Saldıray	(Germany) Germaniawerft, Kiel	23 July 1938	5 June 1939	Decommissioned 1958
Atılay	(Germany) Germaniawerft, Kiel	1938	19 May 1939	Mined & sunk on 14 July 1942
Batıray	(Germany) Germaniawerft, Kiel	28 September 1938	Seized by Germany: 20 September 1939, commissioned as Kriegsmarine UA	Scuttled by crew 3 May 1945
Yıldıray	(Turkey) Gölcük Naval Shipyard	26 August 1939	15 January 1946	Decommissioned 1958

== Oruç Reis class ==
Oruç Reis-class submarine (version of (United Kingdom) Royal Navy S-class submarine):

Name	Builder	Launched	Acquired	Fate
Oruç Reis	(United Kingdom) Vickers-Armstrongs Barrow-in-Furness	19 July 1940; Taken over by Royal Navy as HMS P611	Delivered 9 May 1942	Scrapped 1957
Murat Reis	(United Kingdom) Vickers-Armstrongs	20 July 1940; Taken over by Royal Navy as HMS P612	Delivered 16 May 1942	Scrapped 1957
Burak Reis	(United Kingdom) Vickers-Armstrongs	19 October 1940; Taken over by Royal Navy as HMS P614	Delivered 17 January 1946	Scrapped 1957
Uluç Ali Reis	(United Kingdom) Vickers-Armstrongs	1 November 1940; Taken over by Royal Navy as HMS P615	Lost in Royal Navy service	Sunk 18 April 1943

== Ex-US Balao class (unmodified type) ==
Ex- (United States) US Navy Balao-class submarine:

Name	Builder	Launched	Acquired	Fate
TCG Birinci İnönü (S-330)	(United States) Electric Boat, Groton, CT	25 June 1944; Ex-USS Brill (SS-330)	23 May 1948	Decommissioned 29 November 1972 & sold for scrapping, November 1980
TCG İkinci İnönü (S-331)	(United States) Electric Boat, Groton, CT	7 May 1944; Ex-USS Blueback (SS-326)	23 May 1948	Decommissioned 30 November 1973, non-commissioned charging platform for submarine batteries 1973–75, returned to US in 1975 & sold for scrapping
TCG Sakarya (S-332)	(United States) Electric Boat, Groton, CT	21 May 1944; Ex-USS Boarfish (SS-327)	23 August 1948	Returned to US custody for scrapping, 1 January 1974
TCG Çanakkale (S-333)	(United States) Electric Boat, Groton, CT	6 August 1944; Ex-USS Bumper (SS-333)	16 November 1950	Decommissioned 11 August 1976
TCG Gür (S-334)	(United States) Electric Boat, Groton, CT	18 June 1944; Ex-USS Chub (SS-329)	25 May 1948	Decommissioned 12 December 1975 & returned to US custody for scrapping
TCG Dumlupınar (S-335)	(United States) Electric Boat, Groton, CT	23 April 1944; Ex-USS Blower (SS-325)	16 November 1950	Sunk in collision on 4 April 1953
TCG Preveze (S-340)	(United States) Manitowoc Shipbuilding Company, Manitowoc, WI	29 August 1943; Ex-USS Guitarro (SS-363)	7 August 1954	Decommissioned 4 May 1972, served as a battery charging hulk until scrapped in September 1983
TCG Cerbe (S-341)	(United States) Manitowoc Shipbuilding Company, Manitowoc, WI	24 October 1943; Ex-USS Hammerhead (SS-364)	23 October 1954	Decommissioned 4 May 1972 & scrapped

== Ex-US Balao class (Fleet Snorkel type) ==
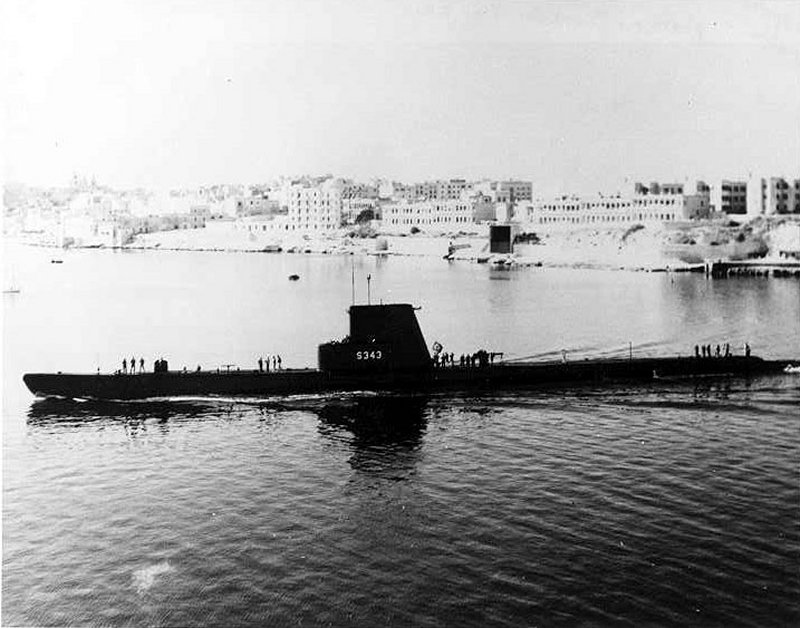
TCG Pirireis (S-343)

Ex- (United States) US Navy Balao-class submarine Fleet Snorkel type:

Name	Builder	Launched	Acquired	Fate
TCG Turgutreis (S-342)	(United States) Electric Boat, Groton, CT	16 February 1944; Ex-USS Bergall (SS-320)	17 October 1958	Decommissioned 5 April 1983, served as a receiving ship, yard craft & battery-charging hulk for other submarines until 1996, then sold for scrap in April 2000
TCG Pirireis (S-343)	(United States) Manitowoc Shipbuilding, Manitowoc, WI	9 November 1944; Ex-USS Mapiro (SS-376)	18 March 1960	Decommissioned 1973 & sold for scrap in 1980
TCG Hızırreis (S-344)	(United States) Manitowoc Shipbuilding, Manitowoc, WI	17 January 1945; Ex-USS Mero (SS-378)	20 April 1960	Discarded in 1977 & used for spare parts

== Ex-US Balao class (GUPPY IA type) ==
Ex- (United States) US Navy Balao-class submarine GUPPY IA type:

Name	Builder	Launched	Acquired	Fate
TCG Dumlupınar (S-339)	(United States) Electric Boat, Groton, CT	30 March 1944; Ex-USS Caiman (SS-323)	30 June 1972	Reclassified as a charging boat, 6 February 1983; retired, 15 September 1986

== Ex-US Balao class (GUPPY IIA type) ==
Ex- (United States) US Navy Balao-class submarine GUPPY IIA type:

Name	Builder	Launched	Acquired	Fate
TCG Burakreis (S-335)	(United States) Portsmouth N Yd, Kittery, ME	28 March 1944; Ex-USS Sea Fox (SS-402)	14 December 1970	Struck 1996
TCG Muratreis (S-336)	(United States) Portsmouth N Yd, Kittery, ME	27 January 1944; Ex-USS Razorback (SS-394)	30 November 1970	Decommissioned 8 August 2001; purchased by the city of North Little Rock, Arkansas on 25 March 2004; berthed on 29 August 2004 & opened to the public at the Arkansas Inland Maritime Museum on 15 May 2005
TCG Oruçreis (S-337)	(United States) Portsmouth N Yd, Kittery, ME	27 October 1943; Ex-USS Pomfret (SS-391)	1 July 1971	Decommissioned 1987
TCG Preveze (S-345)	(United States) Electric Boat, Groton, CT	17 December 1944; Ex-USS Entemedor (SS-340)	1972	Decommissioned & stricken in 1987
TCG Birinci İnönü (S-346)	(United States) Portsmouth N Yd, Kittery, ME	26 June 1944; Ex-USS Threadfin (SS-410)	18 August 1972	Decommissioned 11 August 1998

== Ex-US Balao class (GUPPY III type) ==
Ex- (United States) US Navy Balao-class submarine GUPPY III type:

Name	Builder	Launched	Acquired	Fate
TCG İkinci İnönü (S-333)	(United States) Electric Boat, Groton, CT	10 June 1945; Ex-USS Corporal (SS-346)	21 November 1973	Stricken 2 September 1996 & scrapped
TCG Çanakkale (S-341)	(United States) Electric Boat, Groton, CT	1 April 1945; Ex-USS Cobbler (SS-344)	15 January 1974	Decommissioned 22 January 1998

== Ex-US Tench class ==
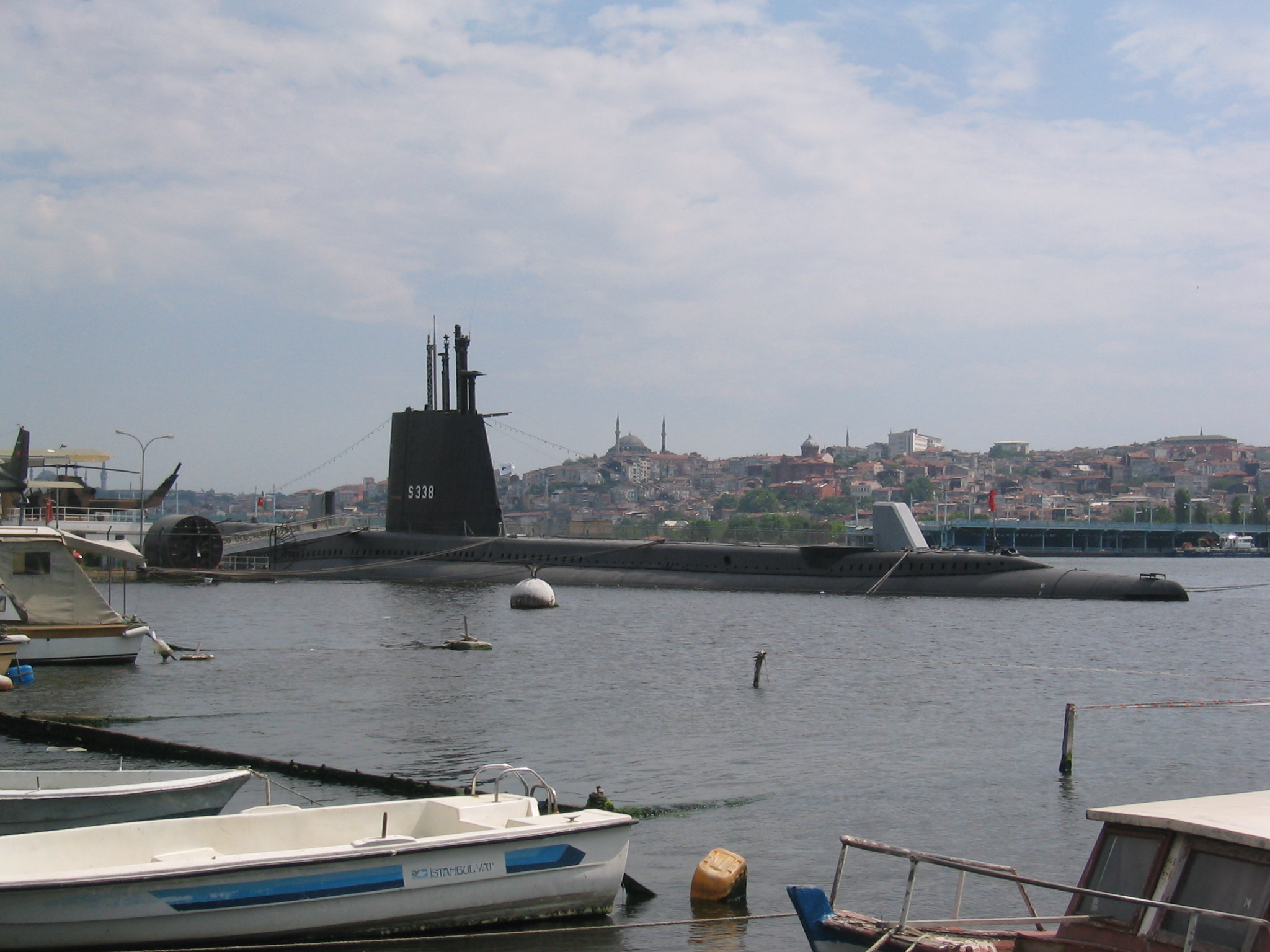
TCG Uluçalireis, (Rahmi M. Koç Museum, Golden Horn)

Ex- (United States) US Navy Tench-class submarine GUPPY IIA Program:

Name	Builder	Launched	Acquired	Fate
TCG Uluçalireis (S-338)	(United States) Portsmouth N Yd, Kittery, ME	7 July 1944; Ex-USS Thornback (SS-418)	1 July 1971	Decommissioned in 2000 & made into a museum ship
TCG Cerbe (S-340)	(United States) Portsmouth N Yd, Kittery, ME	18 August 1944; Ex-USS Trutta (SS-421)	1 July 1972	Decommissioned 23 July 1999

== Ex-US Tang class ==
Ex- (United States) US Navy Tang-class submarine:

Name	Builder	Launched	Acquired	Fate
TCG Pirireis S-343	(United States) Portsmouth N Yd, Kittery, ME	19 June 1951; Ex-USS Tang (SS-563)	8 February 1980	Decommissioned August 2004 & turned into a museum ship at İnciraltı Sea Museum
TCG Hızırreis (S-342)	(United States) Portsmouth N Yd, Kittery, ME	11 June 1952; Ex-USS Gudgeon (SS-567)	1983	Decommissioned 4 February 2004 & turned into a museum ship at Kocaeli Museum Ships Command

== Atılay class ==
Atılay-class submarine (Germany) Howaldtswerke-Deutsche Werft Type 209/1200:

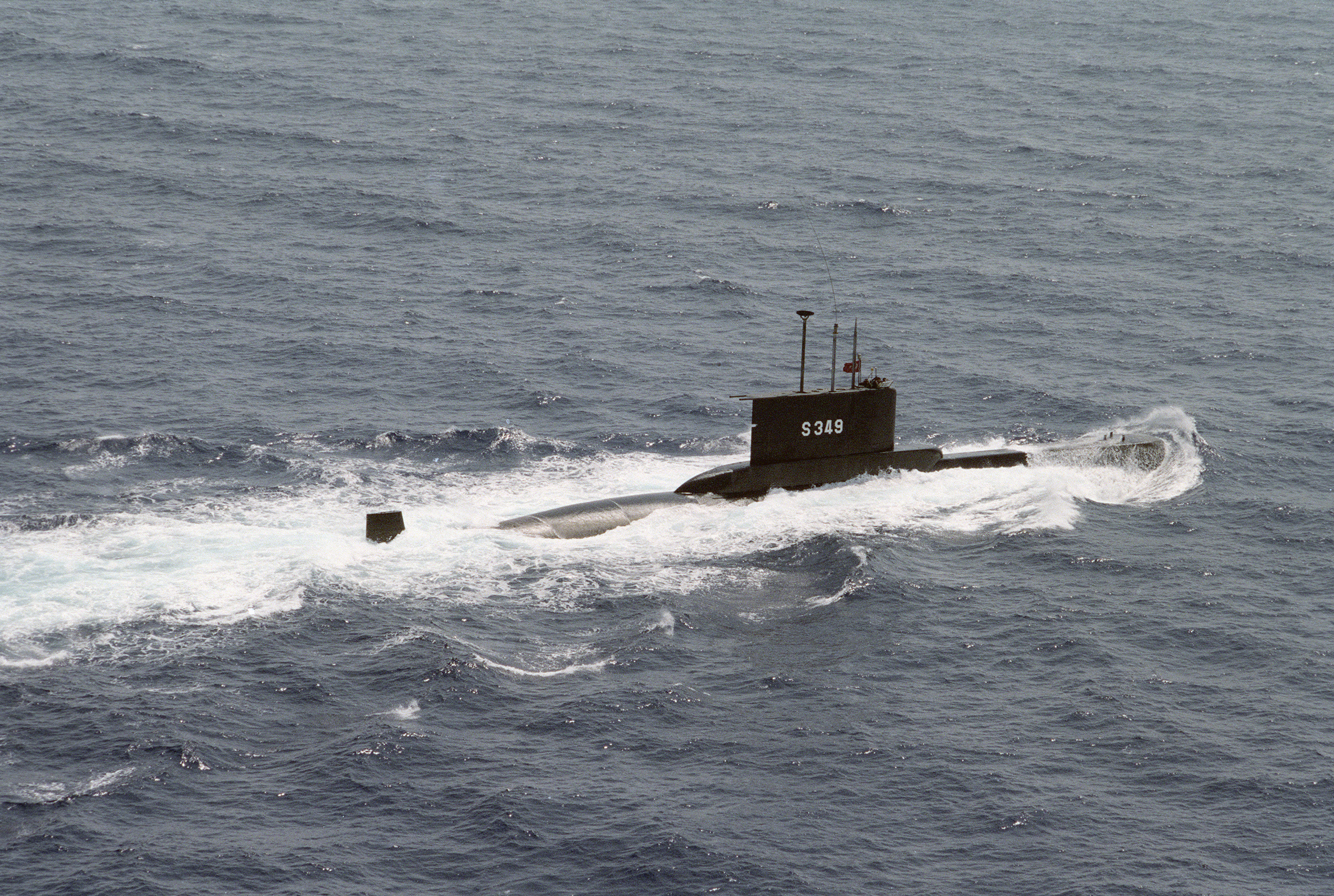
Atılay-class submarine TCG Batıray underway.

Name	Builder	Launched	Commissioned	Fate
TCG Atılay (S-347)	(Germany) Howaldtswerke, Kiel	23 October 1974	23 July 1975	Decommissioned 30 November 2016
TCG Saldıray (S-348)	(Germany) Howaldtswerke, Kiel	14 February 1975	21 October 1975	Decommissioned 14 November 2014
TCG Batıray (S-349)	(Germany) Howaldtswerke, Kiel	24 October 1977	20 July 1978	Decommissioned 11 June 2025
TCG Yıldıray (S-350)	(Turkey) Gölcük Naval Shipyard	20 July 1979	20 July 1981	Decommissioned 16 March 2026
TCG Doğanay (S-351)	(Turkey) Gölcük Naval Shipyard	16 November 1983	16 November 1985	Active
TCG Dolunay (S-352)	(Turkey) Gölcük Naval Shipyard	22 July 1988	21 July 1989	Active

== Preveze class ==
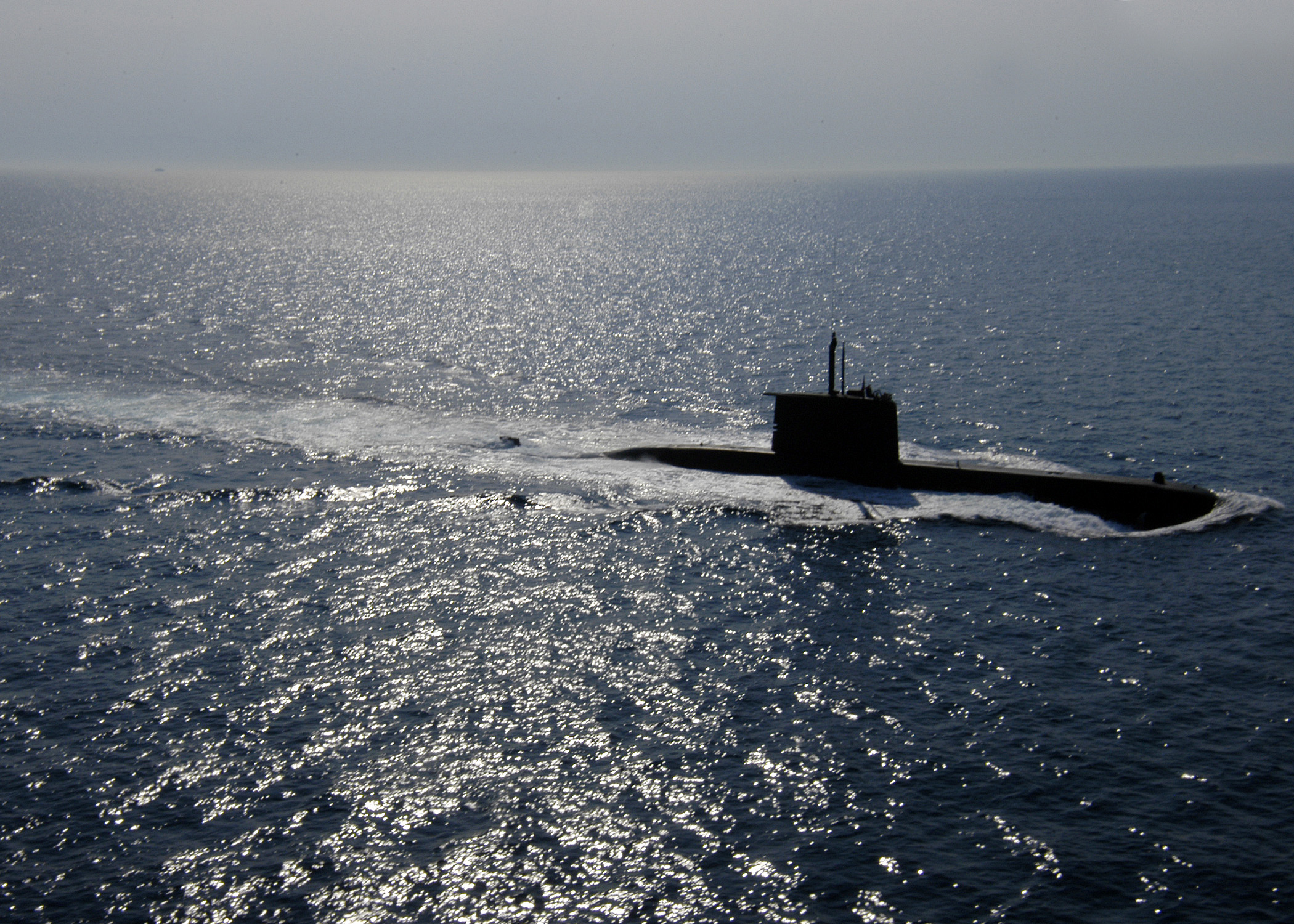
S-353 TCG Preveze, a Type 209/1400 submarine of the Turkish Navy, during a NATO exercise near the Gulf of Taranto.

Preveze-class submarine (Germany) Howaldtswerke-Deutsche Werft Type 209T1/1400:

Name	Builder	Launched	Commissioned	Fate
TCG Preveze (S-353)	(Turkey) Gölcük Naval Shipyard	22 November 1993	28 July 1994	Active
TCG Sakarya (S-354)	(Turkey) Gölcük Naval Shipyard	28 July 1994	21 December 1995	Active
TCG 18 Mart (S-355)	(Turkey) Gölcük Naval Shipyard	25 August 1997	28 July 1998	Active
TCG Anafartalar (S-356)	(Turkey) Gölcük Naval Shipyard	1 September 1998	22 July 1999	Active

== Gür class ==
Gür-class submarine (Germany) Howaldtswerke-Deutsche Werft Type 209T2/1400:

Name	Builder	Launched	Commissioned	Fate
TCG Gür (S-357)	(Turkey) Gölcük Naval Shipyard	May 2002	24 July 2003	Active
TCG Çanakkale (S-358)	(Turkey) Gölcük Naval Shipyard	September 2002	13 December 2004	Active
TCG Burakreis (S-359)	(Turkey) Gölcük Naval Shipyard	2 September 2005	1 November 2006	Active
TCG Birinci İnönü (S-360)	(Turkey) Gölcük Naval Shipyard	24 May 2007	27 June 2008	Active

== Reis-class ==
Reis-class submarine - Type 214 submarines, featuring an air-independent propulsion (AIP) system developed by Howaldtswerke-Deutsche Werft GmbH (HDW).

Name	Builder	Launched	Commissioned	Fate
TCG Piri Reis (S-330)	(Turkey) Gölcük Naval Shipyard	22 December 2019	25 August 2024	Active
TCG Hızır Reis (S-331)	(Turkey) Gölcük Naval Shipyard	23 May 2022	2025?	Under sea trials
TCG Murat Reis (S-332)	(Turkey) Gölcük Naval Shipyard	8 June 2024	2026?	Floating dock activities started
TCG Aydın Reis (S-333)	(Turkey) Gölcük Naval Shipyard		2027?	
TCG Seydi Ali Reis (S-334)	(Turkey) Gölcük Naval Shipyard		2028?	
TCG Selman Reis (S-335)	(Turkey) Gölcük Naval Shipyard		2029?	
