= Oruç Reis (ship) =

Oruç Reis is the name of a number of Turkish vessels. It may refer to:

- RV MTA Oruç Reis, a research vessel
- TCG Oruç Reis (1942), a former submarine of the Turkish Navy (ex-HMS P611)
- TCG Oruçreis (F-245), Barbaros-class frigate of the Turkish Navy
- TCG Oruçreis (S-337), decommissioned Oruç Reis-class submarine of the Turkish Navy (ex-USS Pomfret (SS-391))

== See also ==
- TCG Oruç Reis
