= TCG Pirireis =

TCG Pirireis or TCG Piri Reis is the name of the following submarines of the Turkish Navy, named for Piri Reis:

- TCG Pirireis (S 343), ex-USS Mapiro (SS-376), a Balao-class submarine transferred on loan under the Military Assistance Program to Turkey on 18 March 1960. Sold outright to Turkey, 1 August 1973. Disposed of in 1973.
- TCG Pirireis (S 343), ex-USS Tang (SS-563), lead Tang-class submarine leased to Turkey on 8 February 1980, sold on 6 August 1987, and decommissioned in August 2004.
- TCG Piri Reis (S 330), lead Reis-class submarine, commissioned in 2024
