= TCG Uluç Ali Reis =

TCG Uluç Ali Reis or Uluçalireis is the name of the following submarines of the Turkish Navy:

- TCG Uluçalireis (S 338), ex-USS Thornback, a Tench-class submarine acquired in 1971, decommissioned in 2000, now a museum ship
- TCG Uluç Ali Reis (1940), ex-HMS P615, an Oruç Reis-class submarine sunk by U-123 on 18 April 1943

== See also ==
- Uluç Ali Reis
