= TCG Oruç Reis =

At least three warships of Turkey have borne the name TCG Oruç Reis or Oruçreis:

- TCG Oruç Reis (1942) - an Oruç Reis-class submarine ordered by Turkey from a United Kingdom shipyard but seized prior to her launch in 1940. She was commissioned in the Royal Navy as HMS P611 before being handed over to Turkey in 1942 and regaining her name. She was broken up in 1957.
- TCG Oruçreis (S-337), a Balao-class submarine launched in 1943 as USS Pomfret and acquired by Turkey in 1971, she was stricken in 1987
- TCG Oruçreis (F-245) - a Barbaros-class frigate launched in 1994

== See also ==
- RV MTA Oruç Reis, a research vessel
