= TCG Burak Reis =

TCG Burak Reis or Burakreis is the name of the following ships of the Turkish Navy, named for Admiral Burak Reis:

- TCG Burak Reis (1946), ex-HMS P614, a Oruç Reis-class submarine commissioned in 1946 and stricken in 1957
- TCG Burakreis (S 335), ex-USS Sea Fox, a Balao-class submarine acquired in 1970 and stricken in 1996
- TCG Burakreis (S 359), a Gür-class submarine commissioned in 2006
