= List of submarine operators =

The following countries operate or have operated submarines for naval or other military purposes.

== Countries with currently operational submarines ==
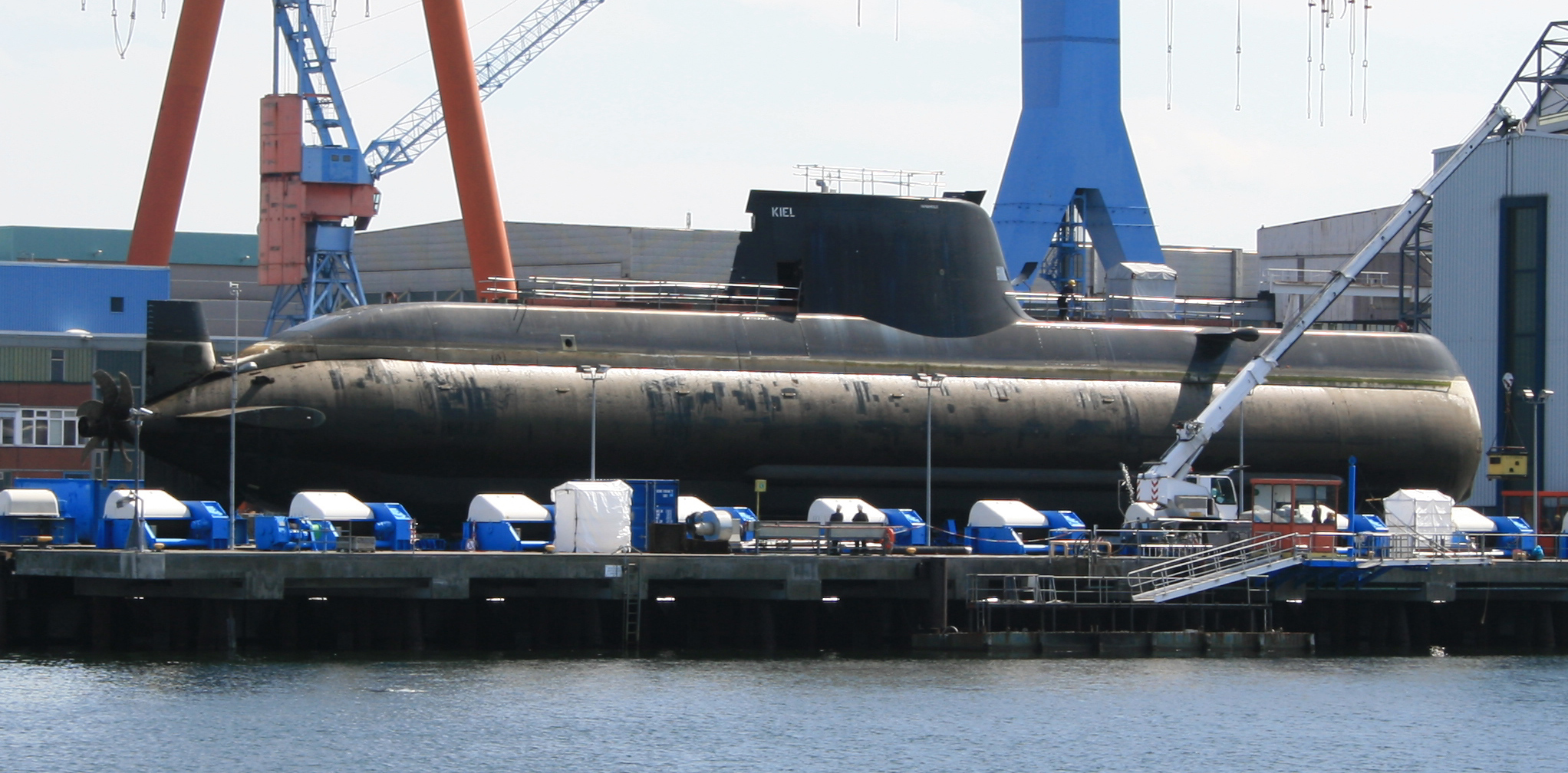
Greek Type 214 submarine

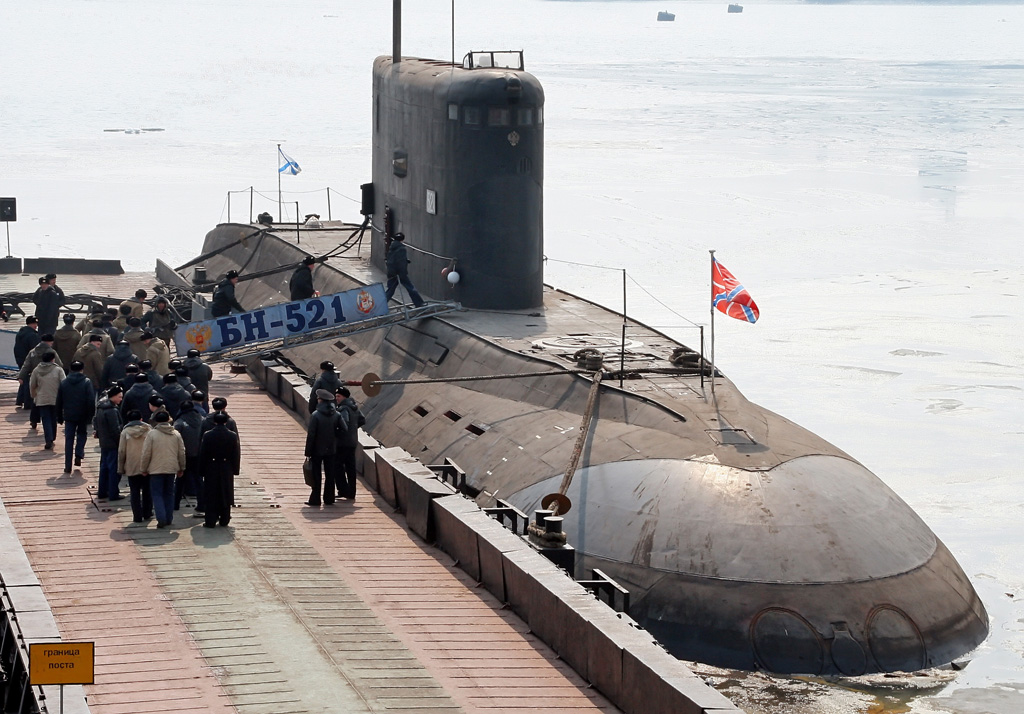
Russian Kilo-class submarine

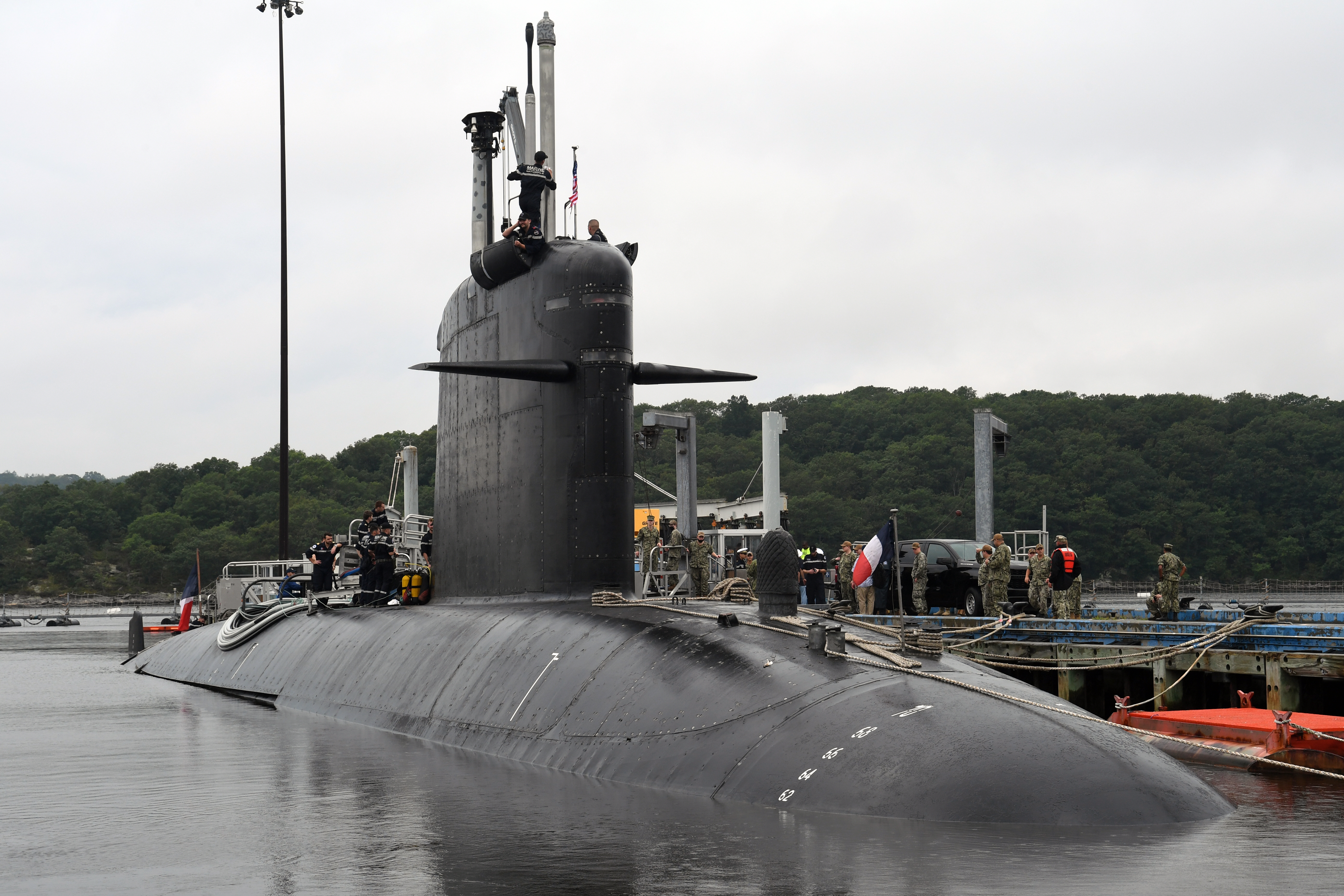
French Rubis-class submarine

- Algeria
- Australia
- Azerbaijan
- Bangladesh
- Brazil
- Canada
- Chile
- Colombia
- Cuba - One indigenous design submarine was reported in service in 2020.
- Ecuador
- Egypt
- France (list)
- Germany (list)
- Greece
- India (list)
- Indonesia
- Iran
- Italy (list)
- Israel
- Japan
- Malaysia
- Myanmar
- Netherlands (list)
- North Korea
- Norway
- Pakistan (list)
- People's Republic of China
- Republic of China (Taiwan)
- Peru
- Poland
- Portugal (list)
- Russia (list) (some ex-Soviet Union)
- Singapore
- South Africa
- South Korea
- Spain (list)
- Sweden (list)
- Thailand
- Turkey (list)
- United Kingdom (list)
- United States (list)
- Venezuela
- Vietnam

== Ballistic Missile Submarines (SSBN) ==
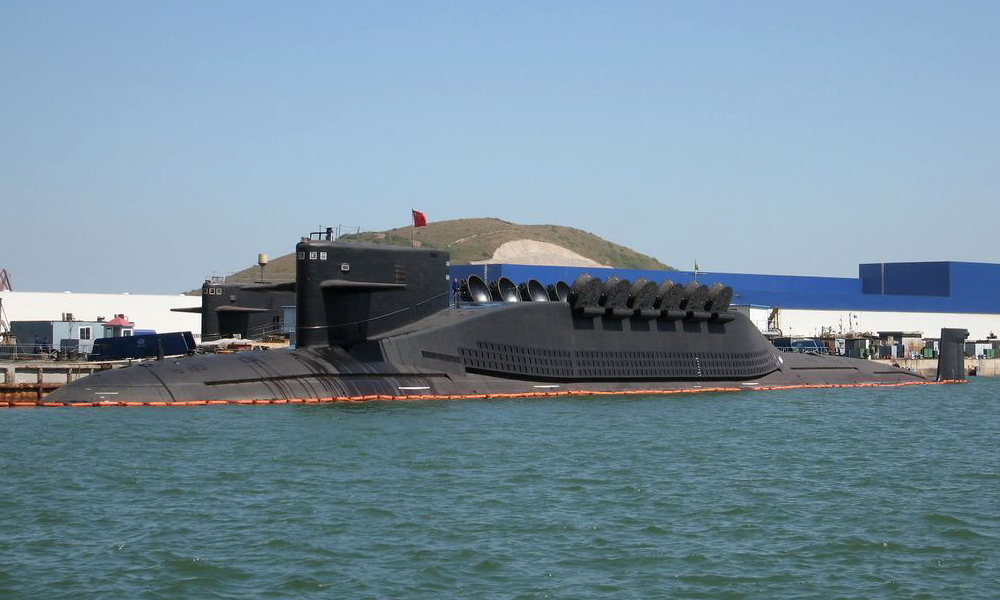
Chinese Type 094 submarine

Ballistic missile submarines are larger than any other type of submarine, in order to accommodate ballistic missiles capable of carrying nuclear warheads.

- China – Type 094 (Jin class), Type 092 (Xia class)
- France – Triomphant class
- India – Arihant class
- Russia – Delta class, Borei class
- United Kingdom – Vanguard class
- United States – Ohio class

== Countries previously operating submarines ==
- Albania - all retired 1998
- Argentina - Two submarines inactive (non-operational) in the Argentinian Navy.
- Austria-Hungary (list)
- Bulgaria - all retired by 2011
- Cuba - Operated 3 Foxtrot-class submarines retired.
- Denmark - retired after 2003
- Estonia (Kalev and Lembit) - decommissioned 1955 in the Soviet Navy
- Finland - last subs decommissioned after World War II
- Latvia - all submarines taken over by Soviet Union in 1940.
- Libya - all Foxtrot-class submarines retired (1 non-commissioned remains docked)
- Romania (Delfinul, not operational; used for dockside training)
- Serbia and Montenegro (ex-Socialist Federal Republic of Yugoslavia)
- Soviet Union (list) (prior to 1991 collapse, many now operated by successor state Russia)
- Syria - all Romeo-class submarines retired around 1992
- Thailand (Matchanu class during the Franco-Thai War - built in Japan 1938 and retired 1951)
- Ukraine (Zaporizhzhia - lost to Russia in the annexation of Crimea)

== See also ==
- List of submarine classes
