= TCG Hızırreis =

TCG Hızırreis or TCG Hızır Reis is the name of the following submarines of the Turkish Navy, named for Hızır Reis:

- TCG Hızırreis (S 344), ex-USS Mero (SS-378), transferred on loan under the Military Assistance Program to Turkey on 20 April 1960. Sold outright to Turkey, 1 August 1973. Disposed of in 1980.
- TCG Hızırreis (S 342), ex-USS Gudgeon (SS-567), leased to Turkey on 21 March 1980, sold on 6 August 1987, and decommissioned in 31 January 2004.
- TCG Hızır Reis (S 331), a Reis-class submarine commissioned in 2025.
