= TCG Murat Reis =

TCG Murat Reis, also spelled Muratreis, is the name of the following submarines of the Turkish Navy, named for Murat Reis the Elder:

- TCG Muratreis (S 336), ex-USS Razorback, a Balao-class submarine acquired in 1971, decommissioned in 2001, preserved as a museum ship since 2005 at Arkansas Inland Maritime Museum
- TCG Murat Reis (S 332), a Reis-class submarine launched in 2025

== See also ==
- Murat Reis (disambiguation)
