= USS Thornback =

Submarine of the United States

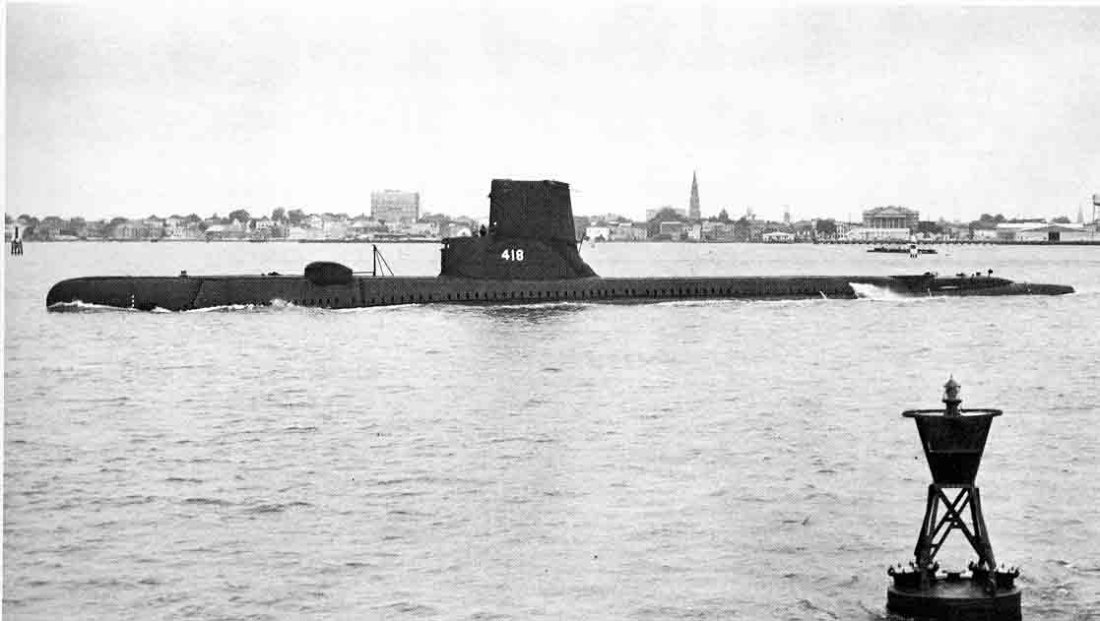
- Thornback (SS-418) in the Cooper River in Charleston, 1956.

History

United States
- Name: USS Thornback
- Namesake: Thornback shark
- Builder: Portsmouth Naval Shipyard, Kittery, Maine
- Laid down: 5 April 1944
- Launched: 7 July 1944
- Commissioned: 13 October 1944
- Decommissioned: 6 April 1946
- Recommissioned: 2 October 1953
- Decommissioned: 1 July 1971
- Stricken: 1 August 1973
- Identification: Hull number SS-418
- Fate: Transferred to Turkey, 1 July 1971, sold to Turkey 1 August 1973

Turkey
- Name: TCG Uluçalireis (S 338)
- Acquired: 1 July 1971
- Out of service: 2000
- Fate: Museum submarine at Çanakkale Naval Museum

General characteristics
- Class & type: Tench-class diesel-electric submarine
- Displacement: 1,570 tons (1,595 t) surfaced; 2,416 tons (2,455 t) submerged
- Length: 311 ft 8 in (95.00 m)
- Beam: 27 ft 4 in (8.33 m)
- Draft: 17 ft (5.2 m) maximum
- Propulsion: 4 × Fairbanks-Morse Model 38D8-⅛ 10-cylinder opposed piston diesel engines driving electrical generators; 2 × 126-cell Sargo batteries; 2 × low-speed direct-drive General Electric electric motors; two propellers; 5,400 shp (4.0 MW) surfaced; 2,740 shp (2.0 MW) submerged
- Speed: 20.25 knots (38 km/h) surfaced; 8.75 knots (16 km/h) submerged
- Range: 11,000 nautical miles (20,000 km) surfaced at 10 knots (19 km/h)
- Endurance: 48 hours at 2 knots (3.7 km/h) submerged; 75 days on patrol
- Test depth: 400 ft (120 m)
- Complement: 10 officers, 71 enlisted
- Armament: 10 × 21-inch (533 mm) torpedo tubes; (6 forward, 4 aft); 28 torpedoes; 1 × 5-inch (127 mm) / 25 caliber deck gun; Bofors 40 mm and Oerlikon 20 mm cannon

General characteristics (Guppy IIA)
- Displacement: 1,848 tons (1,878 t) surfaced; 2,440 tons (2,479 t) submerged
- Length: 307 ft (93.6 m)
- Beam: 27 ft 4 in (8.3 m)
- Draft: 17 ft (5.2 m)
- Propulsion: Snorkel added; One diesel engine and generator removed; Batteries upgraded to Sargo II
- Speed: Surfaced: 17.0 knots (31.5 km/h) maximum; 13.5 knots (25.0 km/h) cruising; Submerged: 14.1 knots (26.1 km/h) for ½ hour; 8.0 knots (14.8 km/h) snorkeling; 3.0 knots (5.6 km/h) cruising
- Armament: 10 × 21 inch (533 mm) torpedo tubes; (six forward, four aft); all guns removed

USS Thornback (hull number SS-418) is a Tench-class submarine, the only ship of the United States Navy to be named for the thornback, a slender member of the shark family with a long pointed snout and a sharp spine at the end of each dorsal fin, native to northern Atlantic waters ranging from the temperate to the Arctic.

Her keel was laid down on 5 April 1944 by the Portsmouth Navy Yard. She was launched on 7 July 1944 sponsored by Mrs. Peter K. Fischler, and commissioned on 13 October 1944 with Commander Ernest P. Abrahamson in command.

Struck from the U.S. Navy's register in 1973, Thornback was transferred to the Turkish Naval Forces and renamed TCG Uluçalireis (S 338), serving until 2000. She is now a museum ship at the Çanakkale Naval Museum.

== World War II ==
On 10 November 1944 Thornback collided with USS CG-74327 (sank); one seaman was killed.

Thornback stood out of New London, Connecticut, on 20 March 1945 bound, via the Panama Canal, for the Hawaiian Islands. She arrived at Pearl Harbor on 25 May and conducted training in Hawaiian waters prior to getting underway on 11 June for the western Pacific. As she stood down the Pearl Harbor channel, a formation of Landing Craft Infantry (LCIs), running down the wrong side of the channel, forced Thornback to crowd dangerously near the extreme edge of the channel. In the process, the submarine damaged her sound dome, necessitating repairs and a two-day delay in departing.

She set sail for Saipan on 13 June, but she was rerouted to Guam. En route to the Mariana Islands, Thornback conducted an average of four training dives daily, in conjunction with battle problems, drills, and emergency surfacing exercises, before she arrived at Guam on 25 June.

As lead ship of a wolf pack nicknamed "Abe's Abolishers", Thornback stood out to sea on 30 June, bound for the Japanese home islands. By this point in the war, American and British task forces steamed within easy gun range of Japanese coastal targets with near impunity. Japan's merchant marine and Navy had dwindled in size. Allied submarines and aircraft had taken an ever-increasing toll. In the air, Japan's once vaunted air forces had been struck from the skies. Sweeping ahead of Third Fleet Task Forces, the "Abolishers" made antipicket boat sweeps in the Tokyo-Yokohama area before proceeding to hunting grounds off the east coast of Honshū and south of Hokkaidō.

Rough seas, strong winds, and generally poor visibility prevailed during Thornback’s patrol. She sighted a hospital ship on 5 July and let it pass. Six days later, a minor fire in the pump room caused a temporary shutdown in the number one air conditioning plant before swift repairs enabled the ship to continue as before.

On 15 July, Thornback sighted submarine Sea Poacher (SS-406), and the two boats exchanged information on their hunting areas. They also swapped movies, precious commodities for boosting morale on board the crowded boats. Six days later, Thornback proceeded north to patrol off Erimo Seki, an area which had recently seen a series of devastating carrier raids by Admiral William F. Halsey's Fast Carrier Task Force 38. The submarine's commanding officer noted somewhat humorously, "This area should be about as heavily traveled as the Sahara Desert after the working over it just had...."

His assessment was correct—only straggling merchantmen and small patrol craft hugged the barren coasts. On 26 July, at 0320, Thornback submerged 8,000 yards (7,300 m) off Hei Saki. At 0400, the submarine's sound gear picked up the "pinging" projected by a snooping Japanese escort ship, and she came to periscope depth to have a look.

Carefully maneuvering into position, Thornback fired one shot from her stern tubes at 04:29 and soon heard a small explosion which stopped the enemy's screws. Almost immediately the submariners picked up new sounds—two more escorts, "pinging" and coming aggressively closer. After sizing up the new attackers, Thornback felt that they were too small to use a torpedo on—besides, a Japanese floatplane had begun circling the area. A rowboat with a few Japanese sailors amidst a pile of flotsam testified to the fact that the first ship was no longer there. Satisfied that their quarry had been sunk, the submarine cleared the area. One of the other escorts gave up the chase and picked up survivors of her sunken sister. "All antisubmarine vessels have closed the beach," Thornback’s commander later recorded, "and seem to be pinging away at the rocks."

Three days later, by periscope, the submarine spotted a 950-ton "sea truck", similar to Sanko Maru, at 2,000 yards (1,800 m), close inshore. Unescorted, the Japanese presented a tempting target for a gun attack, but, no sooner had Thornback’s periscope shears and bow broken the surface, than the target slipped into the misty weather. Not to be daunted, Thornback followed, playing a cat and mouse game, and fired five torpedoes. All missed. She later sighted the enemy again, missed with three more torpedoes, and took the "sea truck" under fire. Despite poor visibility, Thornback closed to 300 yards (270 m) and scored numerous hits with the 40 millimeter guns. The target, however, was able to move closer inshore and escaped in the fog which closed around her like a shroud.

The submarine lurked on the surface off Hokkaidō on 31 July and again tangled with some of the numerous Japanese patrol craft. She sighted a 100-foot (30 m) patrol boat at 500 yards (460 m) and closing. Thornback’s five-inch (127 mm) deck gun was trained out, but her crew could not keep their sights on the attacker through the telescopes and switched to open sights. Meanwhile, the 40 millimeter gun opened a devastating barrage at the enemy craft as it came steadily on a collision course. These shells continually hit the escort ship along the waterline and in the pilot house, probably killing the occupants on the bridge.

Thornback had passed her target once at 300 yards (270 m) and came about for a second pass when the forward torpedo room reported sharp noises forward. Further amplification showed that the noise was caused by enemy machine gun bullets striking the submarine's hull. Resuming the attack, Thornback swung back into action, with visibility only 300 yards (270 m) and lessening. Her 40 millimeter fire continued to maul the Japanese vessel, shooting away one of her masts and leaving her limping shoreward at only 3 knots (6 km/h). After securing from battle stations, Thornback passed through an oil slick and noted a mast from the heavily hit patrol craft.

Later on 31 July, Thornback rendezvoused with Sea Poacher off Kesennuma and proceeded north to pick up submarine Angler (SS-240) en route to a projected shore bombardment mission against Hokkaidō. The sight of the three submarines cruising on the surface moved Thornback’s commander to write: "On this clear and sunny day, the three ships in perfect column on a flat sea made a beautiful picture tearing along at 18 knots."

At 14:02 on 1 August, this part of "Abe's Abolishers"—Thornback, Angler, and Sea Poacher—made landfall off their target of Urakawa, Hokkaidō. They swung parallel to the beach with guns manned and ready. Twelve minutes later, slowing to 10 knots (19 km/h), Thornback and her consorts opened fire with 5-inch (130 mm) and 40 millimeter batteries at a range of 4,200 yards (3,800 m). The first few rounds from Thornback’s five-incher went wild, but the crew soon locked onto the range. Firing by hand after the foot firing plunger broke off, Thornback’s gunners eventually sent 100 rounds of five-inch (127 mm) shells shoreward, heavily damaging a factory and a power plant. "The firing took 22 minutes and was of inestimable value to the entire crew," wrote the submarine's commanding officer. "The training was excellent and the boost to morale tremendous."

Thornback set sail for Midway Island after the shelling of Urakawa, and arrived at the atoll on 8 August. Seven days later, Japan—hemmed in by veritable armadas of Allied ships and planes which were able to roam almost at will and unchallenged off her coast and in her skies—surrendered.

== Post-war service ==
Thornback soon returned to the United States, where she was decommissioned at New London on 6 April 1946 and was placed in the Atlantic Reserve Fleet. Subsequently, brought to the Portsmouth Naval Shipyard, she was converted and reactivated under the Greater Underwater Propulsive Power Program (GUPPY). On 2 October 1953, the submarine was recommissioned, Lieutenant Commander Thomas C. Jones, Jr., in command, and assigned to Submarine Squadron (SubRon) 4.

Shaking down in her new configuration, the submarine performed a "first" for submarines on 6 November 1954, when she snorkeled in the Mississippi River at New Orleans, Louisiana, from the Industrial Canal to the foot of Canal Street. With SubRon 4, the ship was based at Key West, Florida, and visited ports in the Caribbean Sea before entering the Charleston Naval Shipyard in February 1956 for overhaul. Upon completion of this work, the submarine was deployed to the Mediterranean Sea for a tour with the Sixth Fleet before returning to Key West in March 1957. While with SubRon 4, Thornback participated in operations supporting the Operational Development Force, the Fleet Sonar School, and the Fleet Training Unit at Guantanamo Bay, Cuba.

On 2 June 1958, Thornback departed the Caribbean, bound for Londonderry Port, Northern Ireland, and operations with the joint Royal Navy-Royal Air Force antisubmarine school. While thus engaged, the submarine damaged her port propeller at Londonderry Port and became the first American submarine to be docked at Faslane by the Royal Navy. Thornback returned to the Sixth Fleet and her second Mediterranean deployment which lasted from 2 July to 24 September 1958.

For the remainder of the ship's active career, she was based out of Charleston, South Carolina, conducting deployments to the North Atlantic, the Mediterranean Sea, and to the Caribbean Sea and operating in a support capacity as newer submarine types joined the Fleet.

Thornback received one battle star for her World War II service.

== TCG Uluçalireis (S 338) ==
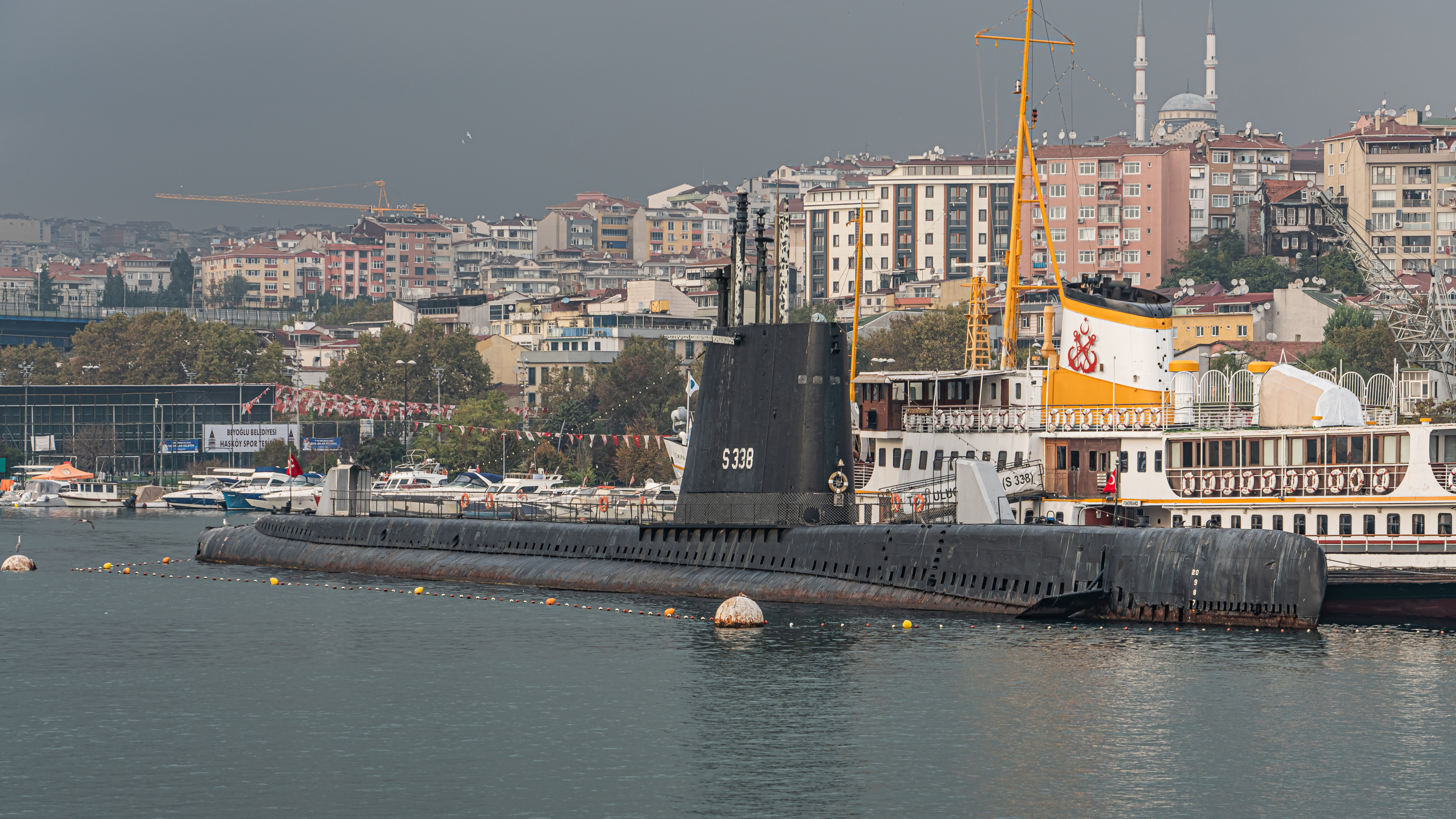
TCG Uluçalireis moored at the Rahmi M. Koç Museum on the Golden Horn in Istanbul

Placed in a reduced manning status on 14 April 1971, the ship was turned over to the Turkish Navy on 1 July 1971 and renamed TCG Uluçalireis (S 338) for the Ottoman admiral Uluç Ali Reis. Decommissioned from the United States Navy on that same date, she was later struck from the Naval Vessel Register on 1 August 1973. In 2000, she was decommissioned after 28 years of service in the Turkish Navy. Handed over to the Rahmi M. Koç Museum, she can be visited at her moorings in Golden Horn in Istanbul.

As of January 2024, she has been moved to the Gölcük Naval Shipyard and is undergoing renovations and maintanace. On 7 February, she was seen in Kocaeli Province alongside TCG Piri Reis (S 330) the first vessel of Reis-class submarine.
