= Murat Reis =

Murat Reis may refer to:

- Murat Reis the Elder (c. 1534–1609), Ottoman privateer and admiral
- Jan Janszoon (c. 1570–c. 1641), Murat Reis the Younger, Dutch pirate and president of the Republic of Salé
- TCG Murat Reis, submarines of the Turkish Navy

== See also ==
- Reis (surname)
