= Çanakkale Naval Museum =

Museum in Çanakkale, Turkey

- Çanakkale Deniz Müzesi
- Çanakkale Naval Museum
- Established: 1982; 44 years ago
- Type: Naval museum
- Owner: Turkish Naval Forces
- Website: https://denizmuzeleri.dzkk.tsk.tr/v1/canakkale-deniz-muzesi-mudurlugu

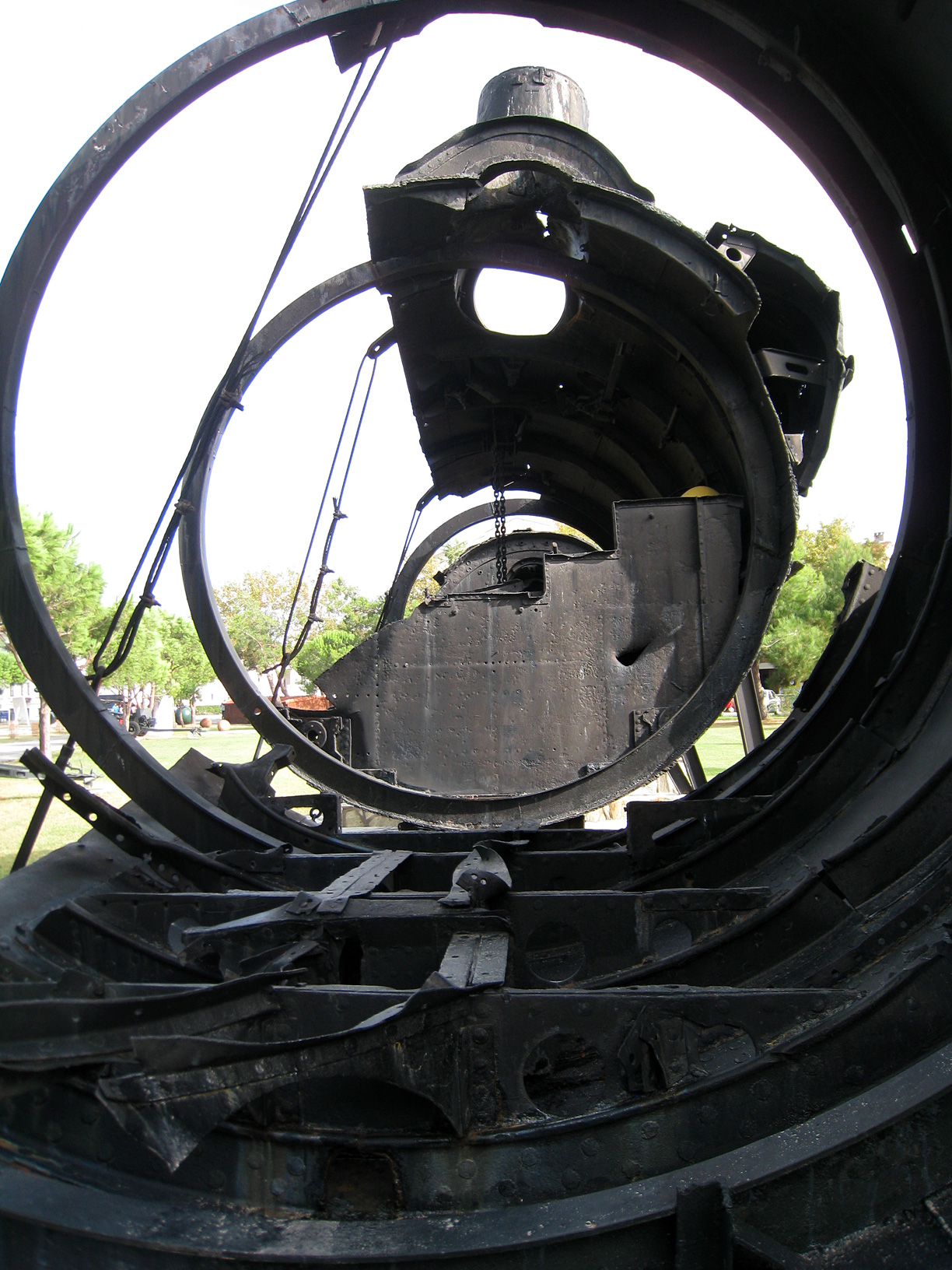
Wreck of German submarine SM UB-46 (during WW1)

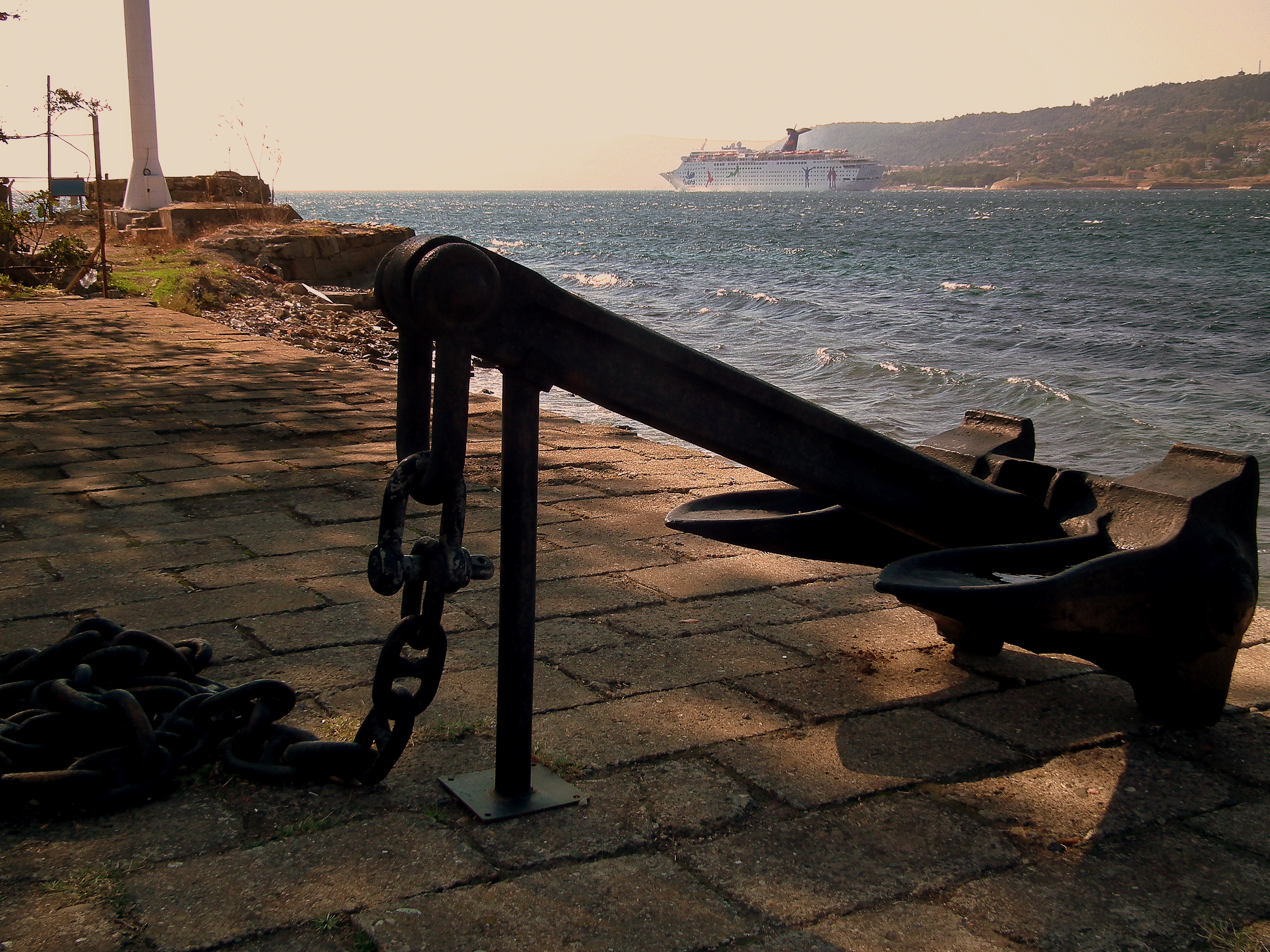
From museum yard

Çanakkale Naval Museum is a museum in Çanakkale, Turkey.

The museum is situated next to Çimenlik Casemates in Çanakkale at 40°08′53″N 26°23′59″E.

== Collection ==
The collections in the museum are classified as follows

Historical boats

Historical galley
Atatürk's boat
Emperyal Boats of the sultanate (Ottoman Empire
Boats used in Ottoman era
Other boats

Metallic exhibits

Weapons
Navigation tools
Stamps and seals
Lanterns
Medals and signs
Clocks

Wooden exhibits

Ships
Coats of arms and tughras (seal of the sultan)
Figureheads
Rigging

Stone exhibits

Lithography
Tomb stones
Inscriptions
Fountains

Art

Oil paintings
Watercolor painting
Charcoal painting
Engravings

Textile exhibits

Uniforms
Flags

Paper exhibits

Hand written documents
Firmans (decrees of the Ottoman sultans)
