= USS Blueback (SS-326) =

Balao-class submarine of the United States Navy

Coordinates: 7°25′S 116°00′E

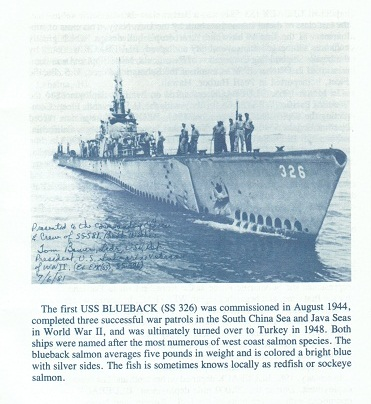
- Excerpt from the decommissioning booklet of the second USS Blueback (SS-581) describing the first USS Blueback (SS-326). The booklet was printed and distributed by the U.S. Navy.

History

United States
- Name: Blueback
- Namesake: Blueback salmon
- Builder: Electric Boat Company, Groton, Connecticut
- Laid down: 29 July 1943
- Launched: 7 May 1944
- Commissioned: 28 August 1944
- Decommissioned: 23 May 1948
- Stricken: 28 May 1948
- Fate: Transferred to Turkey 23 May 1948; Transferred to United States 1975; Sold for scrap

Turkey
- Name: TCG İkinci İnönü
- Namesake: Second Battle of İnönü
- Acquired: 23 May 1948
- Commissioned: 25 May 1948
- Identification: Pennant number D-12 (1948–1955); Pennant number S-18 (1955–1959); Pennant number S 331 (1959–1973)
- Decommissioned: 30 November 1973
- Renamed: TCG Ceryan Botu-2 (Y-1241) 1973
- In service: 1973 (non-commissioned)
- Out of service: 1975 (non-commissioned)
- Fate: Returned to United States 1975
- Notes: Non-commissioned charging platform for submarine batteries 1973–1975

General characteristics
- Class & type: Balao-class diesel-electric submarine
- Displacement: 1,526 tons (1550 t) surfaced; 2,424 tons (2460 t) submerged
- Length: 311 ft 9 in (95.02 m)
- Beam: 27 ft 3 in (8.31 m)
- Draft: 16 ft 10 in (5.13 m) maximum
- Propulsion: 4 × General Motors Model 16-278A V16 diesel engines driving electrical generators; 2 × 126-cell Sargo batteries; 4 × high-speed General Electric electric motors with reduction gears; 2 × propellers; 5,400 shp (4.0 MW) surfaced; 2,740 shp (2.0 MW) submerged
- Speed: 20.25 knots (37 km/h) surfaced; 8.75 knots (16 km/h) submerged
- Range: 11,000 nm (20,000 km) surfaced at 10 knots (19 km/h)
- Endurance: 48 hours at 2 knots (4 km/h) submerged; 75 days on patrol
- Test depth: 400 ft (120 m)
- Complement: 10 officers, 70–71 enlisted
- Armament: 10 × 21-inch (533 mm) torpedo tubes; 6 forward, 4 aft; 24 torpedoes; 1 × 5-inch (127 mm) / 25 caliber deck gun; Bofors 40 mm and Oerlikon 20 mm cannon

USS Blueback (SS-326), a Balao-class submarine in commission from 1944 to 1948, was the first submarine of the United States Navy to be named for the blueback salmon, also known as the sockeye salmon. She completed three war patrols in the South China Sea and Java Sea during World War II. She sank a 300-displacement ton submarine chaser as well as eight smaller vessels.

After her U.S. Navy service, the submarine was transferred to Turkey, and was in commission in the Turkish Naval Forces from 1948 to 1973 as TCG İkinci Inönü (D-12) (also written TCG 2. Inönü (D-2)), later renumbered S-18 and S 331.

== Construction and commissioning ==
Blueback's keel was laid down on 29 July 1943 by the Electric Boat Company at Groton, Connecticut. She was launched on 7 May 1944, sponsored by Mrs. William Brent Young, wife of Rear Admiral William Brent Young, and commissioned on 28 August 1944.

== Service history ==
=== United States Navy ===
==== World War II ====
===== August–December 1944 =====
Following shakedown training off New London, Connecticut, and Newport, Rhode Island, Blueback got underway on 2 October 1944 for Key West, Florida. Upon her arrival there, she began making sound training runs for ships undergoing antisubmarine warfare training at the Fleet Sound School. She departed Key West for the Panama Canal Zone on 20 October 1944, transited the Panama Canal on 24 October, and engaged in further training at Balboa in the Panama Canal Zone before continuing on to Pearl Harbor, Hawaii, where she arrived on 22 November 1944. She then underwent repairs and another two weeks of training in the waters of the Hawaiian Islands.

===== First war patrol =====
On 16 December 1944, Blueback departed Pearl Harbor to commence her first war patrol in company with the submarine Puffer. The submarine Sea Fox joined them at sea on 23 December. The three submarines formed a coordinated attack group which was patrolling north of Saipan in the Mariana Islands on 27 December 1944 when a United States Army Air Forces B-24 Liberator bomber crashed into the sea a few thousand yards [meters] away from the American submarines, and Blueback rescued four of the bomber's crewmen. She put in at Saipan that same afternoon to drop them off and then resumed her patrol on 29 December 1944. On 2 January 1945, she reached the area off Tori-shima in the Izu Islands, where she patrolled for the next 24 days. She transmitted regular weather reports as part of the lengthy preparations for U.S. invasion of Okinawa (scheduled to begin on 1 April 1945), occasionally dived to avoid Japanese planes, and searched for Japanese ships. On 26 January 1945, she left the area and headed southwest into the South China Sea to patrol off Camranh Bay on the coast of Japanese-occupied French Indochina.

On 4 February 1945, Blueback spotted a Japanese convoy heading south toward Camranh Bay and immediately tried to close for an attack but was unable to get near enough to fire her torpedoes. She encountered the same convoy again on 5 February, but once more failed to close the range for an attack. She began lifeguard duties in support of Allied airstrikes on 7 February, taking station 200 nautical miles (370 km; 230 mi) to the southeast of Camranh Bay on the Hong Kong-to-Singapore sea route. This duty ended on 8 February, and she set a course for Fremantle, Australia. Over the next three days, she took part in a search for a Japanese battleship task force headed north from Singapore but never detected it. On 14 February 1945, she received orders changing her destination from Fremantle to Subic Bay on Luzon in the Philippine Islands, and she arrived there on 15 February 1945, concluding her patrol.

At Subic Bay, Blueback moored alongside the submarine tender USS Griffin (AS-13) for a refit. She got underway a few days later for exercises in the waters of the Philippine Islands.

===== Second war patrol =====
Operating in a coordinated attack group with the submarines Bergall, Blackfin, Hawkbill, and Flasher, Blueback began her second war patrol on 4 March 1945 and headed for the area in the South China Sea off the coast of French Indochina. In the early morning of 12 March 1945, a Japanese patrol boat opened fire on her while she was running on the surface. Going deep immediately to evade her attacker, Blueback escaped with only superficial damage. Later that day, she opened fire with her deck guns on a Japanese sailing vessel and sank it. Thereafter, her patrol passed uneventfully until 22 March 1945, when she sank another small Japanese sailing ship with gunfire. Her next action occurred on 26 March, when she fired five torpedoes from her stern torpedo tubes at a Japanese escort destroyer in a convoy, but all five missed. During her attempt to leave the area, she endured a heavy depth-charge barrage before losing her pursuers.

On 27 March 1945, an Allied search plane reported a Japanese convoy to the south of Blueback's coordinated attack group. On 28 March, Blueback sighted the ships and began tracking them. At 10:58, she brought her stern torpedo tubes to bear and fired a three-torpedo spread at a Japanese destroyer. One broached and the rest ran wide of the mark. Again, she weathered a depth-charge attack before getting clear of the area. On 30 March 1945, she attacked three Japanese sailboats with her deck guns and sent two of them to the bottom.

On 3 April 1945, Blueback set a course for the Java Sea. She patrolled off Sumbawa and Lombok in the Japanese-occupied Netherlands East Indies until 12 April without making any contacts and then headed for Australia. She concluded her patrol at Fremantle, Australia, on 17 April 1945 and commenced a refit alongside the submarine tender USS Clytie (AS-26).

===== Third war patrol =====
After a series of post-refit training exercises, Blueback embarked on her third war patrol on 12 May 1945. She entered Lombok Strait on 17 May and spotted her first target, a Japanese sailboat, on 21 May. She opened fire with her 5-inch (127 mm) gun but inflicted only minor damage on the sailboat. On 28 May, she sighted a Japanese submarine chaser and maneuvered into position for an attack. She fired five torpedoes from her bow torpedo tubes at the submarine chaser and then swung her stern tubes to bear for two more. The submarine chaser sustained no damage and returned remarkably accurate fire with her guns. Blueback then departed the area and set a course for the Sunda Strait.

Blueback later sighted several Japanese vessels that were not worth attacking before zeroing in on a Japanese convoy of two large cargo ships with three escorts on 2 June 1945. She fired three torpedoes at the nearest cargo ship and heard one hit. However, loss of depth control prevented her from pursuing the attack. She came to rest on the ocean bottom while undergoing a depth-charge barrage and remained there for almost two hours before surfacing.

On 3 June 1945, Blueback sank a small Japanese boat with her deck guns. Thereafter, her patrol passed uneventfully until 9 June 1945, when she launched a lone torpedo at a Japanese merchant ship. Once again the shot missed. Blueback then shaped a course for Fremantle, where she arrived on 14 June 1945. In addition to a refit, she took up investigations into torpedo accuracy problems. She completed this work on 20 June and resumed her patrol on 21 June 1945.

On 26 June 1945, Blueback entered Lombok Strait and received a contact report on Japanese ships sighted north of Bali. At 01:50 on 27 June, she fired five torpedoes. One hit a few minutes later and stopped the Japanese ship dead in the water. Another hit the victim amidships, causing her to disappear from sight.

Blueback attacked a Japanese sailboat to the east of the Thousand Islands without success on 9 July 1945. On 13 July, while patrolling north of the Thousand Islands, she spotted five small coastal cargo ships. Although she launched three torpedoes at one of the ships, all missed the target. Blueback set course for the Philippine Islands on 15 July and arrived in Subic Bay on 20 July 1945. During her upkeep and training at Subic Bay, World War II came to an end on 15 August 1945 with the cessation of hostilities with Japan.

===== Later operations =====
During the period from 16 December 1944 to 20 July 1945 Blueback completed three war patrols in the South China Sea and Java Sea. She sank a 300-displacement ton submarine chaser as well as eight smaller vessels and inserted a Z Special Unit operative on the north coast of Java in Operation Binatang. She arrived at Subic Bay, Luzon, Philippines, from her third and last war patrol on 20 July 1945.

On 10 July 1945, while in the Java Sea, Ensign John Thomas Beahan, a gunnery officer, was inspecting a .50-caliber gun on the deck of the USS Blueback (SS 326) when it unexpectedly fired two rounds, fatally striking him in the chest. Beahan was buried at sea two days later. Beahan was only Blueback's non-combat casualty.

==== Post-World War II ====
On 31 August 1945, Blueback got underway from Subic Bay bound for Guam in the Mariana Islands, where she arrived on 4 September 1945. She was assigned to Submarine Squadron 36 and conducted daily underway training. On 28 November 1945, she left Guam in company with Submarine Squadron 3 for a training cruise to the Caroline Islands and Admiralty Islands. The submarines returned to Guam on 15 December 1945.

Blueback departed Guam on 12 January 1946 bound for San Diego, California. She conducted operations locally from San Diego unti1 12 August 1946, when she embarked upon a cruise to the Far East. Her ports of call included Pearl Harbor, Truk in the Caroline Islands, Subic Bay, and Tsingtao and Shanghai in China. She returned to San Diego on 29 November 1946 and resumed local operations. On 17 February 1947, she set out on a training voyage to Pearl Harbor. After several weeks of operations in Hawaiian waters, she returned to San Diego on 4 April 1947 and resumed local operations and training along the coast of California, which she continued until March 1948.

On 4 March 1948, Blueback departed San Diego and, after a stop at Naval Submarine Base New London in Groton, Connecticut, proceeded across the Atlantic Ocean and the Mediterranean Sea to İzmir, Turkey, where she arrived on 11 May 1948. She was decommissioned and transferred to Turkey on 23 May 1948. She was stricken from the Naval Vessel Register on 28 May 1948.

==== Honors and awards ====
- Asiatic-Pacific Campaign Medal with two battle stars for World War II service
- World War II Victory Medal
- China Service Medal

=== Turkish Naval Forces ===
On 25 May 1948, the submarine was commissioned in the Turkish Naval Forces as TCG İkinci Inönü (D-2) (also written TCG 2. Inönü (D-2), English "Second Inönü"), the second of three Turkish submarines named for the Second Battle of İnönü, fought from 23 March to 1 April 1921 during the Greco-Turkish War of 1919–1922, a part of the larger Turkish War of Independence. İkinci Inönü received the new pennant number S-18 in 1955, and in 1959 was renumbered S 331 in accordance with the North Atlantic Treaty Organization (NATO) pennant system.

After long service in the Turkish Naval Forces, İkinci Inönü was decommissioned and transferred back to the United States on 30 November 1973. She then was renamed TCG Ceryan Botu-2 (Y-1241) and it was used to charge the batteries of other submarines until 1975. She subsequently was transferred back to the United States and sold for scrapping.
