= USS Mero =

Submarine of the United States

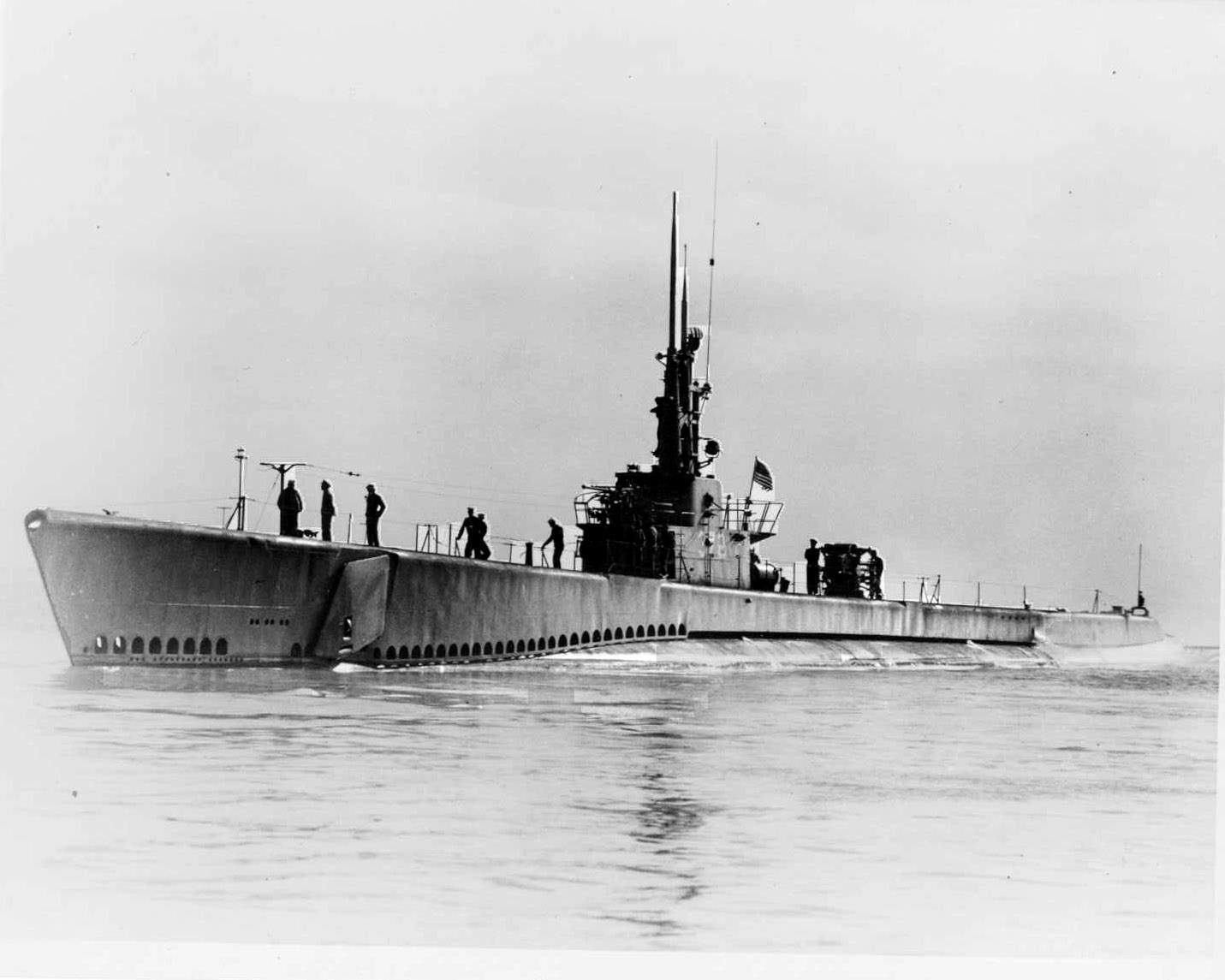

History

United States
- Name: USS Mero (SS-378)
- Builder: Manitowoc Shipbuilding Company, Manitowoc, Wisconsin
- Laid down: 22 July 1944
- Launched: 17 January 1945
- Commissioned: 17 August 1945
- Decommissioned: 15 June 1946
- Recommissioned: 29 December 1959
- Decommissioned: 20 April 1960
- Stricken: 1 August 1973
- Fate: Transferred to Turkey, 20 April 1960, sold to Turkey, 1 August 1973

Turkey
- Name: TCG Hızırreis (S 344)
- Acquired: 20 April 1960
- Commissioned: 23 August 1960
- Fate: Discarded 1977; used for spare parts

General characteristics
- Class & type: Balao class diesel-electric submarine
- Displacement: 1,526 tons (1,550 t) surfaced; 2,424 tons (2,463 t) submerged
- Length: 311 ft 9 in (95.02 m)
- Beam: 27 ft 3 in (8.31 m)
- Draft: 16 ft 10 in (5.13 m) maximum
- Propulsion: 4 × General Motors Model 16-278A V16 diesel engines driving electrical generators; 2 × 126-cell Sargo batteries; 4 × high-speed General Electric electric motors with reduction gears; 2 × propellers; 5,400 shp (4.0 MW) surfaced; 2,740 shp (2.0 MW) submerged
- Speed: 20.25 knots (38 km/h) surfaced; 8.75 knots (16 km/h) submerged
- Range: 11,000 nautical miles (20,000 km) surfaced at 10 knots (19 km/h)
- Endurance: 48 hours at 2 knots (3.7 km/h) submerged; 75 days on patrol
- Test depth: 400 ft (120 m)
- Complement: 10 officers, 70–71 enlisted
- Armament: 10 × 21-inch (533 mm) torpedo tubes; 6 forward, 4 aft; 24 torpedoes; 1 × 5-inch (127 mm) / 25 caliber deck gun; Bofors 40 mm and Oerlikon 20 mm cannon

USS Mero (SS-378), a Balao-class submarine, was a ship of the United States Navy named for the mero, any of several large groupers found in warm ocean waters.

== Construction and commissioning ==
Mero was laid down by the Manitowoc Shipbuilding Company at Manitowoc, Wisconsin, on 22 July 1944; launched on 17 January 1945, sponsored by Mrs. Henry G. Taylor; and commissioned at Manitowoc on 17 August 1945. She was the last submarine built at Manitowoc.

== Operational history ==
=== United States Navy ===
Mero got underway for shakedown in Lake Michigan 25 August; thence, between 6 September and 17 November she cruised the Great Lakes and visited several ports including Detroit, Cleveland, and Chicago. The Mero tied up at The Michigan Avenue bridge in Chicago and was open to visitors who were allowed aboard for a tour of the boat. Placed in floating drydock 9 November – 2 November, she reached New Orleans via the Mississippi River 29 November, on 6 December sailed for the Canal Zone, trained there a month, then sailed for Pearl Harbor 19 January 1946.

Mero reached Pearl 5 February and operated out of there until sailing for the west coast 22 February. Arriving San Francisco Bay 1 March, after preinactivation overhaul, she steamed to Mare Island 14 March to join the 19th Fleet, and decommissioned there 15 June 1946. Assigned to the Pacific Reserve Fleet, she remained berthed at Mare Island until converted to a Fleet Snorkel submarine in 1960.

=== Turkish Navy ===
On 20 April 1960, Mero was transferred on loan to Turkey under the Military Assistance Program. The Turkish Navy renamed her TCG Hızırreis (S 344). After her voyage from San Francisco, Hızırreis was commissioned into Turkish Navy service on 23 August 1960.

On 1 August 1973, Hızırreis was formally sold to Turkey and struck from the U.S. Naval Vessel Register. She was discarded by the Turkish Navy in 1977 and used for spare parts.
