= USS Sea Fox =

Submarine of the United States

Coordinates: 31°10′N 129°41′E

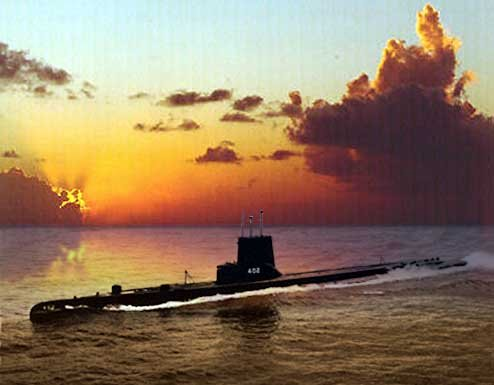
- Sea Fox (SS-402) underway, off San Francisco, California

History

United States
- Name: USS Sea Fox
- Builder: Portsmouth Naval Shipyard, Kittery, Maine
- Laid down: 2 November 1943
- Launched: 28 March 1944
- Commissioned: 13 June 1944
- Decommissioned: 15 October 1952
- Recommissioned: 5 June 1953
- Decommissioned: 14 December 1970
- Stricken: 14 December 1970
- Identification: SS-402
- Fate: Transferred to Turkey, 14 December 1970

Turkey
- Name: TCG Burakreis
- Acquired: 14 December 1970
- Commissioned: 8 August 1971
- Stricken: 1996
- Identification: S335

General characteristics
- Class & type: Balao-class diesel-electric submarine
- Displacement: 1,526 tons (1,550 t) surfaced; 2,391 tons (2,429 t) submerged
- Length: 311 ft 6 in (94.95 m)
- Beam: 27 ft 3 in (8.31 m)
- Draft: 16 ft 10 in (5.13 m) maximum
- Propulsion: 4 × Fairbanks-Morse Model 38D8-⅛ 10-cylinder opposed piston diesel engines driving electrical generators; 2 × 126-cell Sargo batteries; 4 × high-speed Elliott electric motors with reduction gears; two propellers; 5,400 shp (4.0 MW) surfaced; 2,740 shp (2.0 MW) submerged
- Speed: 20.25 knots (38 km/h) surfaced; 8.75 knots (16 km/h) submerged
- Range: 11,000 nautical miles (20,000 km) surfaced at 10 knots (19 km/h)
- Endurance: 48 hours at 2 knots (3.7 km/h) submerged; 75 days on patrol
- Test depth: 400 ft (120 m)
- Complement: 10 officers, 70–71 enlisted
- Armament: 10 × 21-inch (533 mm) torpedo tubes; 6 forward, 4 aft; 24 torpedoes; 1 × 5-inch (127 mm) / 25 caliber deck gun; Bofors 40 mm and Oerlikon 20 mm cannon

General characteristics (Guppy IIA)
- Class & type: none
- Displacement: 1,848 tons (1,878 t) surfaced; 2,440 tons (2,479 t) submerged
- Length: 307 ft (94 m)
- Beam: 27 ft 4 in (8.33 m)
- Draft: 17 ft (5.2 m)
- Propulsion: Snorkel added; One diesel engine and generator removed; Batteries upgraded to Sargo II
- Speed: Surfaced: 17.0 knots (19.6 mph; 31.5 km/h) maximum; 13.5 knots (15.5 mph; 25.0 km/h) cruising; Submerged: 14.1 knots (16.2 mph; 26.1 km/h) for ½ hour; 8.0 knots (9.2 mph; 14.8 km/h) snorkeling; 3.0 knots (3.5 mph; 5.6 km/h) cruising
- Armament: 10 × 21-inch (533 mm) torpedo tubes; (six forward, four aft); all guns removed

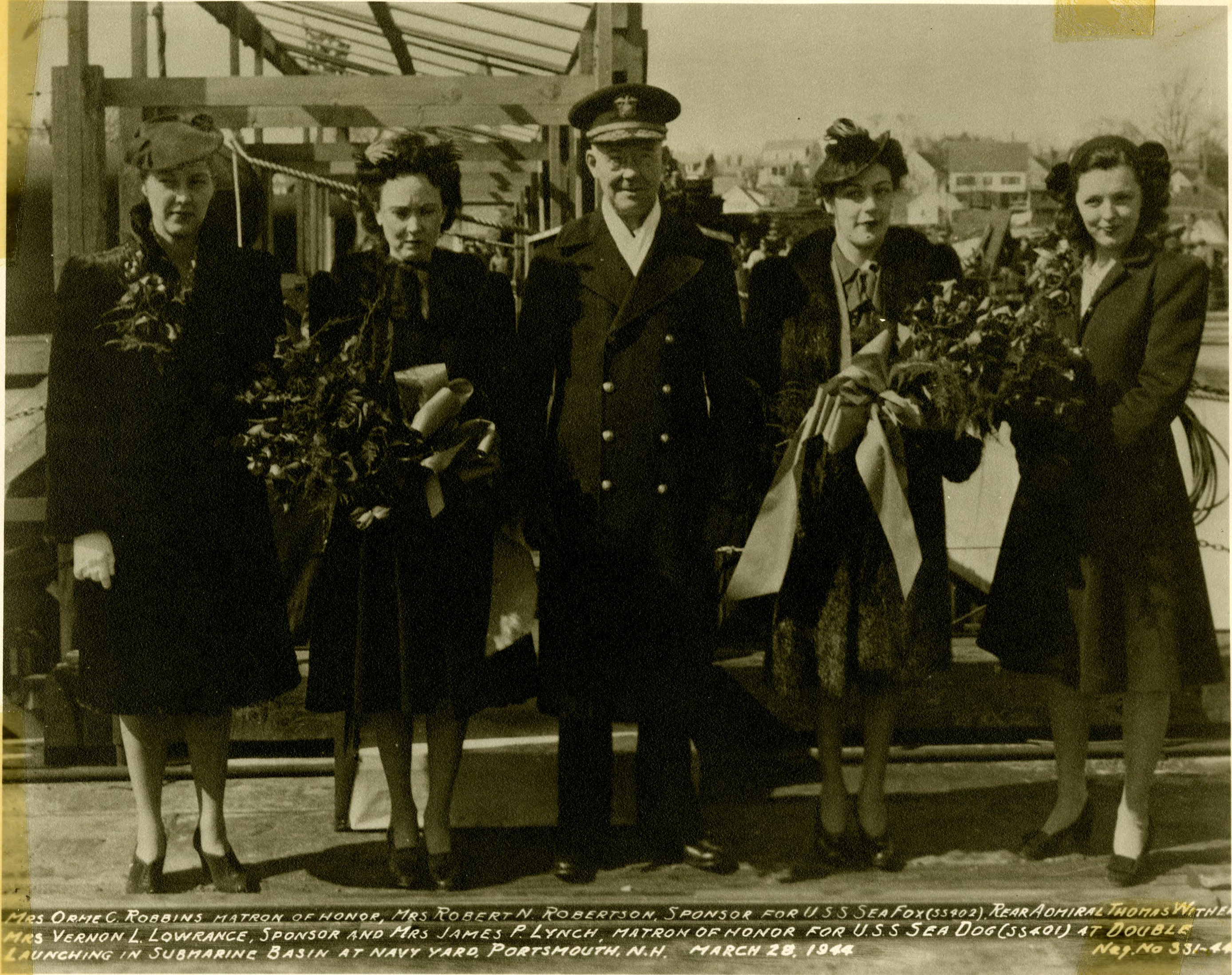
Original caption: Mrs. Orme C. Robbins, matron of honor, Mrs. Robert N. Robertson, sponsor for USS Sea Fox. Rear Admiral Thomas Withers, Mrs. Vernon L. Lowrance, sponsor, and Mrs. James P. Lynch, matron of honor for USS Sea Dog at double launching in submarine basin at Navy Yard, Portsmouth, N.H. 28 March 1944.

USS Sea Fox (SS-402), a Balao-class submarine, was a vessel of the United States Navy named for the sea fox, a large shark, also called the thresher shark, which frequents the coast of Europe and the Americas.

Sea Fox was laid down on 2 November 1943 at the Portsmouth Navy Yard in Kittery, Maine; launched on 28 March 1944, sponsored by Mrs. Robert N. Robertson, widow of Lieutenant Robert N. Robertson, who survived the sinking of USS Squalus only to be lost during the war as executive officer of USS Argonaut. The submarine was commissioned on 13 June 1944.

== Service history ==
=== First patrol: October–November 1944 ===
Two months after commissioning, Sea Fox departed New London for Hawaii and duty in Submarine Division 282 (SubDiv 282). She arrived at Pearl Harbor on 11 September and, on 4 October, got underway on her first war patrol. On 16 October, she entered her initial patrol area near the Bonin Islands, and remained in the Bonin-Volcano Islands area through 25 October, hunting enemy shipping and serving on lifeguard duty for B-24 Liberator aircraft strikes against Iwo Jima.

On 26 October, she conducted her first attack and damaged an enemy freighter; then proceeded on to the Nansei Shoto in the Ryukyus. There, on 8 November, after firing 11 torpedoes in four attacks, she sank an engines-aft cargoman. Of the 11 torpedoes fired, several broached and one circled and passed over Sea Fox's conning tower. On 15 November, the submarine departed her assigned area and arrived at Majuro on 24 November for refit.

=== Second patrol: December 1944 – February 1945 ===
On her second war patrol, 20 December 1944 to 5 February 1945, Sea Fox returned to the Nansei Shoto as a unit of Task Group 17.19, a coordinated attack group composed of her, Blueback, and Puffer. En route to Saipan to top off with fuel, the submarines and their PC escort picked up survivors of a downed Liberator. On 28 December, the submarines departed the Marianas for the Ryukyus; and, on 1 January 1945, Sea Fox reached her patrol area.

Nine days later, she made her only contact worthy of torpedo fire but, despite two attacks, was unsuccessful. Puffer, to which she reported the contact, later sank the target, Coast Defense Vessel No. 42. In February 1945, while undergoing refit at Guam, five of her crewmembers were killed in a Japanese ambush.

=== Third and fourth patrols: March – July 1945 ===
Sea Fox's third war patrol, 8 March to 6 May 1945, saw her in the South China Sea–Formosa area. She made six contacts but was able to close and attack only one, a convoy of three merchantmen and four escorts. During that action, conducted in heavy fog on the morning of 1 April, she damaged one of the freighters.

That same day, Queenfish sank the "mercy" ship, Awa Maru; and, on 2 April, Sea Fox was ordered into the area to pick up survivors and wreckage to determine the type of cargo Awa Maru had been carrying. Sea Fox located no survivors but found bales of sheet rubber covering the area where the ship had gone down. She took aboard one of the sheets and continued her patrol.

The next day, one of Sea Fox's crew was accidentally shot by another crewman. Efforts to transfer the wounded man to a homeward-bound submarine were thwarted by rough seas, and the patient remained aboard for the duration of the patrol.

In mid-April, Sea Fox was off the northwest coast of Formosa where she encountered a shift in Japanese antisubmarine warfare (ASW) tactics. Patrol planes were numerous at night, precluding recharging. The planes, however, were relatively inactive during daylight hours, and Sea Fox surfaced and recharged accordingly.

On the night of 16–17 April, Sea Fox departed her patrol area. Progress toward Saipan was slowed by a casualty in the bow plane rigging mechanism on 19 April; but, on 26 April, she arrived in the Marianas, and she reached Pearl Harbor on 6 May. Refit took a month, and Sea Fox sailed on 7 June for her last war patrol. Assigned primarily to lifeguard duty during the 53-day patrol, she picked up nine Army aviators near Marcus Island and a tenth in the Nanpō Islands. On 29 July, she completed the patrol at Midway.

=== 1945–1952 ===
The war ended with the completion of refit, and Sea Fox headed toward Pearl Harbor for a two-week visit prior to getting underway for postwar duty with Submarine Squadron 5 (SubRon 5) in the Philippines. Based at Subic Bay, she operated in the Philippine area into 1946; then, on 12 January, got underway to return to the United States.

Sea Fox arrived in San Francisco Bay on 2 February. Overhaul followed; and in mid-May, she returned to Pearl Harbor where she rejoined Submarine Division 52 (SubDiv 52). During the remainder of the 1940s, she was deployed three times: to the central Pacific in the summer of 1946, and to the western Pacific in the winter of 1948 and in the fall of 1949. The end of the latter year also brought a brief assignment to SubDiv 13, but January 1950 saw her a unit of SubDiv 12. Six months later, the Korean War broke out; and Sea Fox's training exercises—mine planting, torpedo approaches, gunnery, and ASW—increased.

On 2 September 1951, the submarine sailed west. A six-month tour in the western Pacific followed during which she supported the United Nations' effort in Korea by providing services to the ASW training group and by patrolling in the northern Sea of Japan. In March 1952, she returned to the Hawaiian Islands to resume local operations and to prepare for a GUPPY IIA conversion.

=== 1953–1970 ===
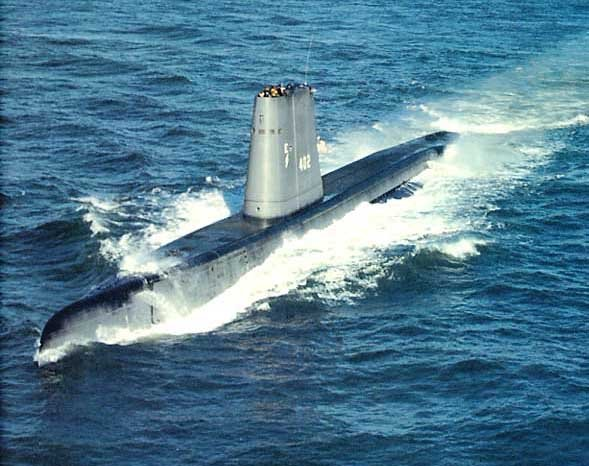
Sea Fox underway after her GUPPY conversion

Decommissioned on 15 October 1952 at Mare Island Naval Shipyard, Sea Fox completed conversion the following spring and was recommissioned on 5 June 1953. In August, she returned to Pearl Harbor and resumed operations—training exercises, special operations, and western Pacific deployments—as a unit of SubDiv 71.

Reassigned to SubDiv 33 at San Diego on 1 July 1955, she became flagship of the division on 1 August and commenced local operations off the southern California coast. A year later, she sailed west for another six-month tour with the 7th Fleet; and, from then until 1969, she continued to rotate between training operations out of San Diego and duty with the 7th Fleet in the western Pacific. From 1964, her tours in WestPac included support of the Allied effort in South Vietnam.

On 21 December 1968, Sea Fox returned to San Diego from her WestPac deployment. Local operations, overhaul, and training exercises followed then she completed her final WestPac tour in the summer of 1970. In November 1970, she was declared unfit for further service. She was decommissioned, her name was struck from the Navy List on 14 December 1970.

== TCG Burakreis (S 335) ==
Sea Fox was sold to Turkey on 14 December 1970 at Hunters Point Navy Yard in San Francisco. The Turkish Navy renamed her TCG Burakreis (S 335), after the great Ottoman admiral Burak Reis. She sailed for her new home on 9 April 1971 from San Diego after conducting ASW training. She was commissioned on 8 August 1971.

In 1996, Burakreis was struck from the Turkish Naval rolls.

== Honors and awards ==
As Sea Fox, the submarine earned four battle stars during World War II and four campaign stars for service during the Vietnam War. In 1964 and 1965 Sea Fox was twice awarded the Battle ready designation.
