= USS Pomfret =

Submarine of the United States

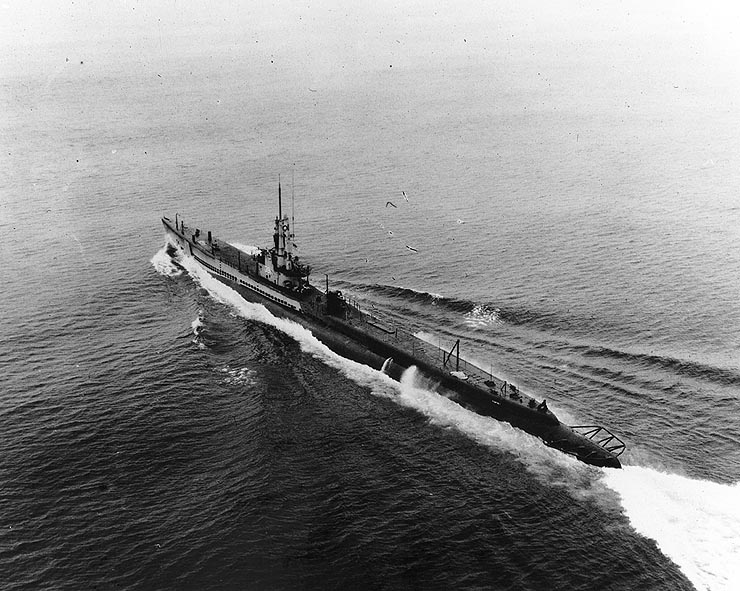
- USS Pomfret (SS-391) in 1951, prior to her "Guppy IIA" modernization.

History

United States
- Name: USS Pomfret (SS-391)
- Builder: Portsmouth Naval Shipyard, Kittery, Maine
- Laid down: 14 July 1943
- Launched: 27 October 1943
- Sponsored by: Miss Marilyn Maloney
- Commissioned: 19 February 1944
- Decommissioned: April 1952
- Recommissioned: 5 December 1952
- Decommissioned: 1 July 1971
- Stricken: 1 August 1973
- Fate: Transferred to Turkey, 1 July 1971, sold to Turkey 1 August 1973

Turkey
- Name: TCG Oruçreis (S 337)
- Acquired: 1 July 1971
- Commissioned: 3 May 1972
- Decommissioned: 1987

General characteristics
- Class & type: Balao-class diesel-electric submarine
- Displacement: 1,526 tons (1,550 t) surfaced; 2,391 tons (2,429 t) submerged
- Length: 311 ft 6 in (94.95 m)
- Beam: 27 ft 3 in (8.31 m)
- Draft: 16 ft 10 in (5.13 m) maximum
- Propulsion: 4 × Fairbanks-Morse Model 38D8-⅛ 10-cylinder opposed piston diesel engines driving electrical generators; 2 × 126-cell Sargo batteries; 4 × high-speed Elliott electric motors with reduction gears; two propellers; 5,400 shp (4.0 MW) surfaced; 2,740 shp (2.0 MW) submerged
- Speed: 20.25 knots (38 km/h) surfaced; 8.75 knots (16 km/h) submerged
- Range: 11,000 nautical miles (20,000 km) surfaced at 10 knots (19 km/h)
- Endurance: 48 hours at 2 knots (3.7 km/h) submerged; 75 days on patrol
- Test depth: 400 ft (120 m)
- Complement: 10 officers, 70–71 enlisted
- Armament: 10 × 21-inch (533 mm) torpedo tubes; 6 forward, 4 aft; 24 torpedoes; 1 × 5-inch (127 mm) / 25 caliber deck gun; Bofors 40 mm and Oerlikon 20 mm cannon

General characteristics (Guppy IIA)
- Class & type: none
- Displacement: 1,848 tons (1,878 t) surfaced; 2,440 tons (2,479 t) submerged
- Length: 307 ft (93.6 m)
- Beam: 27 ft 4 in (8.3 m)
- Draft: 17 ft (5.2 m)
- Propulsion: Snorkel added; One diesel engine and generator removed; Batteries upgraded to Sargo II
- Speed: Surfaced: 17.0 knots (19.6 mph; 31.5 km/h) maximum; 13.5 knots (15.5 mph; 25.0 km/h) cruising; Submerged: 14.1 knots (16.2 mph; 26.1 km/h) for ½ hour; 8.0 knots (9.2 mph; 14.8 km/h) snorkeling; 3.0 knots (3.5 mph; 5.6 km/h) cruising
- Armament: 10 × 21 inch (533 mm) torpedo tubes; (six forward, four aft); all guns removed

USS Pomfret (SS-391), a Balao-class submarine, was a ship of the United States Navy named for the pomfret, a fish of the seabream family which is a powerful and speedy swimmer, capable of operating at great depths.

== Construction and commissioning ==
Pomfret was laid down 14 July 1943 and launched 27 October 1943 by the Portsmouth Navy Yard, in Kittery, Maine, sponsored by Miss Marilyn Maloney, daughter of Senator Francis Maloney; and commissioned 19 February 1944.

== World War II ==
After training, the new submarine arrived at Pearl Harbor 1 June 1944. She departed Pearl Harbor 23 June and proceeded via Midway to her first patrol area—the east coast of Kyūshū and Bungo Suido. On 6 July she made an emergency dive when attacked by a Japanese plane. On 12 July she allowed a Japanese hospital ship to proceed in peace. After attempting an attack on a battleship, she arrived at Midway 16 August.

On 10 September she departed Midway for the Luzon Straits-South China Sea area to conduct her second patrol. She sighted two enemy battleships on 26 September, but their speed and the presence of an enemy submarine prevented an attack.

On 2 October Pomfret sank Tsuyama Maru, a 6,962-ton passenger-cargo vessel. After the usual depth charging, she departed for Saipan and moored in Tanapag Harbor 12 October.

After refit and training, Pomfret reentered the same patrol area 1 November as part of a wolf pack, with Cdr. John B. Hess now commanding. Pomfret sank Atlas Maru, 7,347-tons and Hamburg Maru, 5,271-tons. On 25 November, she sank Japanese Patrol Boat No.38 and cargo ship Shōhō Maru, 1,356-tons. Pomfret departed the area and proceeded via Midway to Pearl Harbor.

The submarine began her fourth patrol 25 January 1945 in another wolf pack. The mission was a picket boat sweep ahead of a carrier task force soon to strike the Tokyo-Nagoya area. After completing the sweep without encountering any picket boats, she moved south of Honshū for lifeguard work.

On 16 February she rescued a pilot from the aircraft carrier Hornet, Lieutenant (jg) Joe Farrel. The next day, she saved a pilot from Cabot, Ensign Robert L. Buchanan. The incident was described in "Silent Victory" by Clay Blair (Lippincott, 1975) as follows:

Pomfret, commanded by John Hess, made a spectacular rescue. A pilot from the carrier Cabot was forced to ditch in the outer waters of Tokyo Bay. Fighters circled over Pomfret, guiding Hess to the rubber life raft. Hess fearlessly took Pomfret into these restricted waters and rescued the pilot, Ensign R. L. Buchanan. During this same bold operation, Hess picked up another pilot, Lieutenant Joseph P. Farrell from Hornet, and a Japanese pilot. War correspondent Ernie Pyle devoted a column to the rescue entitled 'Even If You Was Shot Down in Tokyo Harbor, the Navy Would Be In to Get You'.

That day she also captured two prisoners. Unsuccessfully attacked by a Japanese destroyer on 10 March, she departed the area 23 March and arrived at Midway on 30 March. Departing Midway 26 April for the Kuril Islands-Okhotsk Sea area, she entered the area 5 May. On 26 May she fired torpedoes at an enemy anti-submarine hunter-killer group, but scored no hits. She returned to Midway 7 June.

On 2 July she departed for her sixth war patrol. After lifeguard duty south of Honshū, she began patrol in the East China Sea. On 19 July she sank the first of 44 floating mines. On 24 July, she shelled the Kuskaki Jima lighthouse and radio installations and, on 26 July, she destroyed a three-masted junk and a small schooner. On 8 August she rescued the entire five-man crew of a B-25 bomber. Pomfret continued to shell small craft and pick up Japanese and Korean survivors until the cessation of hostilities 15 August 1945. The following day she headed for Guam. On 9 September she arrived at San Francisco.

== Post-war service ==
On 2 January 1946 Pomfret departed Mare Island Naval Shipyard for Guam, arriving 22 January 1946. She proceeded to Subic Bay, Philippine Islands 9 March, and from there steamed to Tsingtao, China where for six weeks she acted as target for U.S. antisubmarine warfare vessels based at Tsingtao. On 18 May she returned to Pearl Harbor, her new homeport. During the next three years, she made two tours of duty in Western Pacific: the first, April to August 1947, and the second, December 1948 to April 1949.

Jimmy Carter, future President of the United States (1977–1981), served aboard Pomfret from 17 December 1948 to 1 February 1951 as his first submarine assignment. Carter is the only U.S. president to have qualified as a submariner. During this period Pomfret deployed to the Western Pacific Ocean and conducted operations in the waters off Japan and the coast of China.

In 1950 Pomfret arrived in San Diego. She operated along the United States West Coast until February 1951, participated in the Korean War until September and returned to San Diego to operate locally. Pomfret decommissioned in April 1952 for conversion at Mare Island to a Guppy IIA submarine. After conversion, she recommissioned 5 December and in the ensuing years alternated between coastal operations off San Diego and Western Pacific deployments.

She departed for Far Eastern waters 7 July 1967 on a cruise which included anti-submarine warfare exercises in the Gulf of Tonkin off Vietnam. She returned to San Diego 23 January 1968 and spent most of that year in exercises off San Diego.

== TCG Oruçreis (S 337) ==
In 1971, transfers to the Turkish Navy were resumed, starting with Pomfret. After three months of training, she was transferred on 1 July in San Diego, and renamed TCG Oruçreis (S 337), after the great Ottoman seaman Oruç Reis. Her new crew sailed to the Philadelphia Naval Yard for an overhaul, and then, before sailing to Turkey, she took part in ASW training in Key West, Florida between 27 February – 22 March 1972. Oruçreis was commissioned on 3 May 1972. Ex-Pomfret was purchased outright by Turkey and simultaneously struck from the US Naval Register, 1 August 1973.

She served in the Turkish Navy until 1987.

== Awards ==
- Asiatic-Pacific Campaign Medal with five battle stars
- World War II Victory Medal
- Navy Occupation Medal
- China Service Medal
- National Defense Service Medal with star
- Armed Forces Expeditionary Medal
- Vietnam Service Medal with two campaign stars
- Republic of Vietnam Campaign Medal

== Commemoration ==
Pomfret′s ship's bell is located in the officer's club of Dugway Proving Ground in Utah.
