= HMS P611 =

Submarine of the Royal Navy

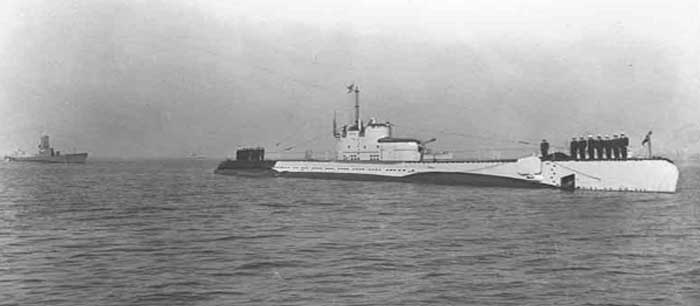

History

United Kingdom
- Name: HMS P611
- Namesake: Aruj Barbarossa, also known as Oruç Reis
- Builder: Vickers Armstrong, Barrow-in-Furness
- Laid down: 24 May 1939
- Launched: 19 July 1940
- Commissioned: 1 December 1941
- Fate: Transferred to the Turkish Navy, 9 May 1942

Turkey
- Name: Oruç Reis
- Acquired: 9 May 1942
- Fate: Broken up 1957

General characteristics
- Class & type: Oruç Reis-class submarine
- Displacement: 624 tons standard, 683 tons full load surfaced; 856 tons submerged
- Length: 64 m (210 ft)
- Beam: 6.81 m (22.3 ft)
- Draught: 3.61 m (11.8 ft)
- Propulsion: Two shaft diesel-electric; Vickers diesels – 1200 hp; Electric motors – 780 hp
- Speed: 13.7 knots (25.4 km/h) surfaced; 8.4 knots (15.6 km/h) submerged
- Range: 2,500 nautical miles (4,630 km) at 10 knots (19 km/h)
- Complement: 41 men
- Armament: 5 × 21 inch (533 mm) torpedo tubes – 4 bow internal, one stern external; nine torpedoes; 1 × 3 in (76 mm) gun; 1 × 20 mm gun

HMS P611 was a submarine of the Oruç Reis class originally built for the Turkish Navy intended to be named Oruç Reis, but commissioned into the Royal Navy after the outbreak of war.

== TCG Oruç Reis ==
She was a modified British S class design launched on 19 July 1940 by Vickers Armstrong at Barrow-in-Furness. Due to the pressing need for her, she was commissioned into the Royal Navy on 1 December 1941 so she could be sent to Turkey. It was not until 26 March 1942 that she left the Clyde for Gibraltar. On 7 April she left Gibraltar for Alexandria, where she arrived on 25 April. She arrived at the Turkish naval base at İskenderun on 9 May 1942 and was handed over to the Turkish Navy as Oruç Reis. She would continue in service with the Turkish Navy, operating in the Mediterranean, and remained in service after the Second World War ended. She was finally broken up in 1957.
