= USS Mapiro =

Submarine of the United States

History

United States
- Name: USS Mapiro (SS-376)
- Builder: Manitowoc Shipbuilding Company, Manitowoc, Wisconsin
- Laid down: 30 May 1944
- Launched: 9 November 1944
- Commissioned: 30 April 1945
- Decommissioned: 16 March 1946
- Recommissioned: 14 November 1959
- Decommissioned: 18 March 1960
- Stricken: 1 August 1973
- Fate: Transferred to Turkey, 18 March 1960, sold to Turkey 1 August 1973

Turkey
- Name: TCG Pirireis (S 343)
- Namesake: Ottoman Admiral Piri Reis
- Acquired: 18 March 1960
- Commissioned: 24 June 1960
- Out of service: 1973
- Fate: Sold for scrap, 1980

General characteristics
- Class & type: Balao class diesel-electric submarine
- Displacement: 1,526 tons (1,550 t) surfaced; 2,424 tons (2,463 t) submerged
- Length: 311 ft 9 in (95.02 m)
- Beam: 27 ft 3 in (8.31 m)
- Draft: 16 ft 10 in (5.13 m) maximum
- Propulsion: 4 × General Motors Model 16-278A V16 diesel engines driving electrical generators; 2 × 126-cell Sargo batteries; 4 × high-speed General Electric electric motors with reduction gears; 2 × propellers; 5,400 shp (4.0 MW) surfaced; 2,740 shp (2.0 MW) submerged
- Speed: 20.25 knots (38 km/h) surfaced; 8.75 knots (16 km/h) submerged
- Range: 11,000 nautical miles (20,000 km) surfaced at 10 knots (19 km/h)
- Endurance: 48 hours at 2 knots (3.7 km/h) submerged; 75 days on patrol
- Test depth: 400 ft (120 m)
- Complement: 10 officers, 70–71 enlisted
- Armament: 10 × 21-inch (533 mm) torpedo tubes; 6 forward, 4 aft; 24 torpedoes; 1 × 5-inch (127 mm) / 25 caliber deck gun; Bofors 40 mm and Oerlikon 20 mm cannon

USS Mapiro (SS-376), a Balao-class submarine, was a ship of the United States Navy named for the mapiro, a fish of the Gobioidea suborder occurring off the West Indies and the Atlantic coasts of Central America and Mexico.

== Construction and commissioning ==
Mapiro was laid down by Manitowoc Shipbuilding Company at Manitowoc, Wisconsin, on 30 May 1944; launched on 9 November 1944, sponsored by Mrs. Philip H. Ross; and commissioned on 30 April 1945.

== Operational history ==
Following trials on Lake Michigan, Mapiro entered a floating drydock at Lockport, Ill.; and was towed down the Chicago and Mississippi Rivers to New Orleans, La., to be readied for duty in the South Pacific. She sailed for the Canal Zone 31 May, arriving off Balboa 5 June for training. On 28 June the submarine got underway for Hawaii in company with Cutlass (SS-478), arriving Pearl Harbor 15 July.

Mapiro sailed for the Marianas on her first war patrol 4 August, arriving off Saipan the day Japan surrendered, 15 August. She remained on observation patrol until returning to the west coast in September, arriving at San Francisco for deactivation by 25 August.

On 16 March 1946, Mapiro decommissioned to enter the Pacific Reserve Fleet at Mare Island, Calif., 1 January 1947.

== TCG Pirireis (S-343) ==
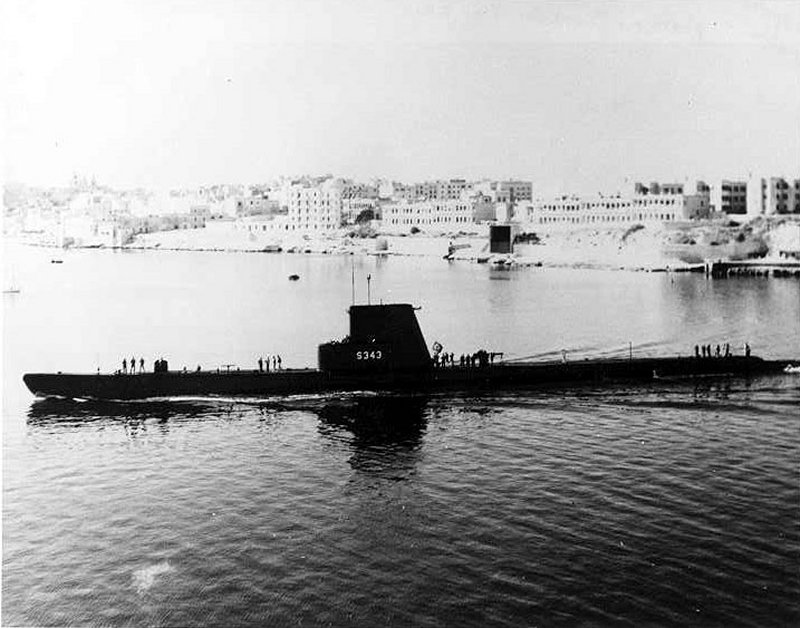
TCG Pirireis (S 343)

In 1960, Mapiro was converted to a Fleet Snorkel submarine. On 18 March 1960 she was transferred on loan under the Military Assistance Program to Turkey. The Turkish Navy renamed her TCG Pirireis (S-343), after Piri Reis (ca. 1465–1554), an Ottoman admiral and cartographer. She left San Francisco on 16 May 1960 for Istanbul via the Panama Canal, with her new Turkish crew. Pirireis arrived in Gölcük on 23 June 1960. She was commissioned into Turkish Navy the day after.

The submarine was struck from the US Naval Register, and sold outright to Turkey, 1 August 1973; she was scrapped by the Turkish Navy in 1973.

In 1983, a second ex-U.S. Navy submarine, the former USS Tang (SS-563), was renamed TCG Pirireis (S-343) reusing the same hull number.
