= Reis-class submarine =

Class of submarine in the Turkish Navy

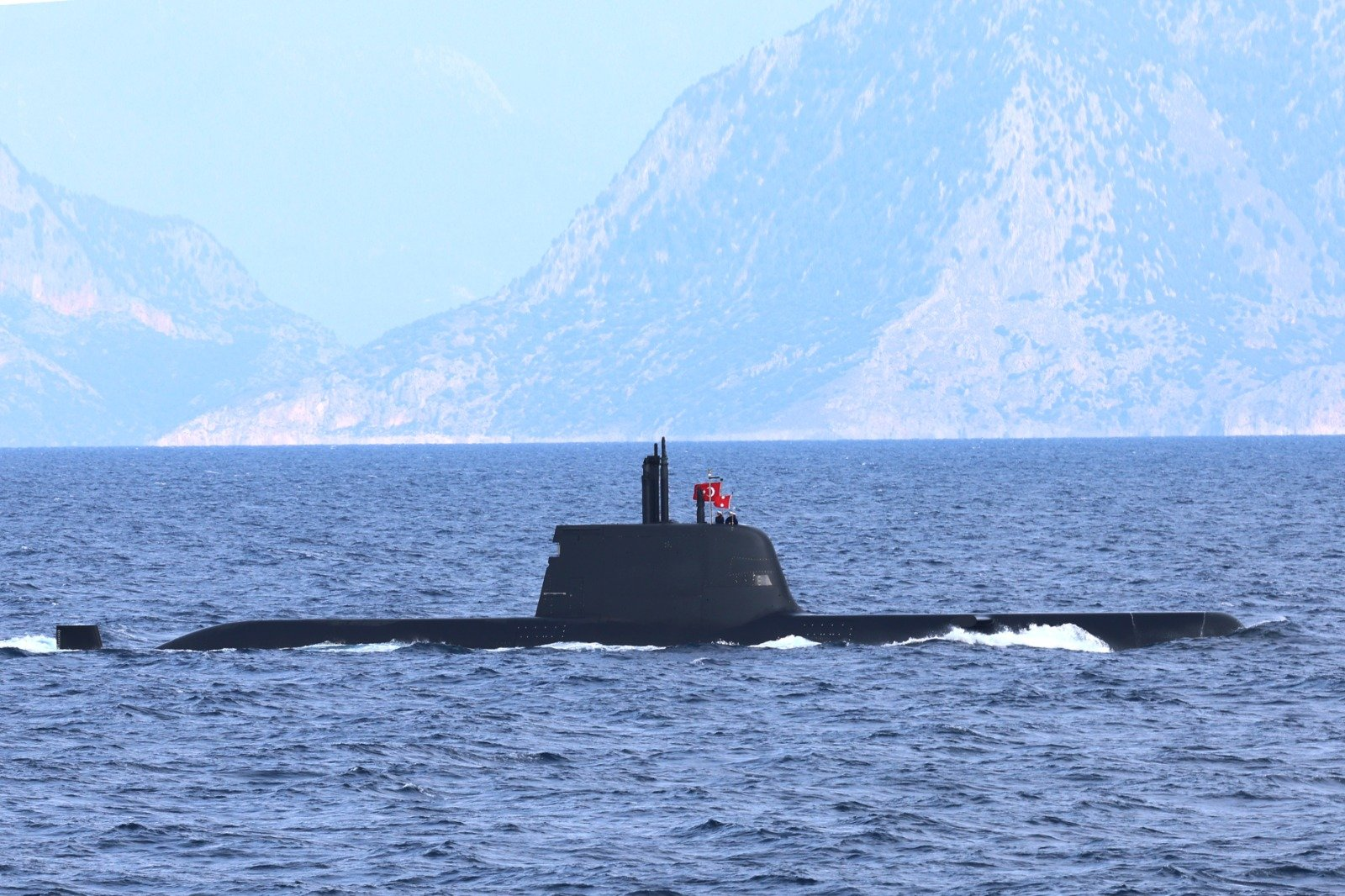
- TCG Piri Reis (S-330) during the Mavi Vatan 2025 exercise of the Turkish Naval Forces, 8 January 2025

Class overview
- Name: Reis class
- Builders: Gölcük Naval Shipyard, Turkey; STM (torpedo section); Aselsan (sensors and electronics)
- Operators: Turkish Navy
- Succeeded by: Atılay class
- Cost: € 2.06 billion
- Planned: 6
- Building: 4
- Completed: 2
- Active: 2

General characteristics
- Displacement: 1,860 t (1,830 long tons) (surfaced) 2,013 t (1,981 long tons) (submerged)
- Length: 68.35 m (224 ft 3 in)
- Beam: 6.30 m (20 ft 8 in)
- Height: 13.1 m (43 ft 0 in) (excluding periscopes)
- Draft: 5.8 m (19 ft 0 in)
- Propulsion: 3,900 kW (5,200 hp) main engine (Siemens Permasyn); 2× diesel generator (MTU 16V 396SE 64L cells); 2× batteries (324 Type 30PS15B); 2× 120 kW (160 hp) fuel cells (Siemens)
- Speed: 10 knots (19 km/h; 12 mph) (surfaced); 20 knots (37 km/h; 23 mph) (submerged)
- Range: 12,000 nmi (22,000 km; 14,000 mi) at 6 knots (11 km/h; 6.9 mph) (surfaced); 420 nmi (780 km; 480 mi) at 8 knots (15 km/h; 9.2 mph) (submerged)
- Complement: 30+11SAT
- Crew: 27
- Sensors & processing systems: ISUS 90-72 sonar and weapon control
- Armament: Torpedo tubes: 8 x 533 mm torpedo tubes: Torpedoes: Roketsan Akya; Mk48 Mod6T; DM2A4; Anti-ship missile: Atmaca

The Reis-class submarines are a group of six license-built submarines based on the Type 214 submarine with Turkish subsystems, armaments and modifications for the Turkish Navy.

== Project history ==
On 28 December 2006, the Undersecretariat for Defence Industries of the Turkish Ministry of National Defense issued a request for proposal, which was revised on 12 July 2007. By 22 November 2007, companies such as the DCNS of France, Navantia of Spain, and a German/British consortium consisting of Howaldtswerke-Deutsche Werft GmbH (HDW) and Marine Force International LLP (MFI) had submitted proposals. After completing the evaluation process, the decision was announced on 22 July 2008 to start contract negotiations first with HDW/MFI. By August 2008, the negotiations started. The diesel-electric Type 214 submarine of ThyssenKrupp featuring an air-independent propulsion (AIP) system was selected, and the program begin was set to early 2009.

The contract between the Turkish Undersecretariat for Defence Industries and the HDW/MFI consortium was signed on 2 July 2009. Amounting to €2.06 billion, the project came into force on 22 June 2011. The submarines are to be built at Gölcük Naval Shipyard with material packages supplied by the HDW/MFI. The shipyard's capability is to be improved regarding the construction and outfitting of the submarines.

The Turkish defense industry companies ASELSAN, HAVELSAN, MilSOFT, Defense Technologies Engineering and Trade Inc. (STM), Koç Information and Defense, TÜBİTAK Defense Industries Research and Development Institute, and Meteksan Defense, as well as marine industry companies Gürdesan, AYESAŞ, Sirena Marine, Arıtaş, İ-Marine, are involved in the project as subcontractors.

== Production ==
The production of the Reis-class, formerly Cerbe-class, submarines takes place in two large hangars, Block A and B, of the Submarine Production Plant ("Denizaltı İmalat Fabrikası") at Gölcük Naval Shipyard. Block A is for welding works of submarine hull sheets and putting them together, while Block B is used for assembly and outfitting works and can accommodate three boat at one time.

For the six submarines, the chosen names are TCG Pirireis, TCG Hızırreis, TCG Muratreis, TCG Aydınreis, TCG Seydialireis and TCG Selmanreis, after the 16th-century Ottoman Navy admirals Piri Reis, Kurtoğlu Hızır Reis, Murat Reis the Elder, Aydın Reis, Seydi Ali Reis and Selman Reis. Two submarines, USS Mapiro from 1960 to 1973 and USS Tang from 1980 to 2004, were formerly named TCG Pirireis.

The lead submarine, TCG Pirireis, was laid down on 28 September 2015, and launched on 22 December 2019. It began sea trials in December 2022 and was commissioned on 24 August 2024. The second submarine, TCG Hızırreis, commenced sea trials during the same ceremony, while the third submarine, TCG Murat Reis, was docked for fitting. The fourth, fifth, and sixth submarines—TCG Aydınreis, TCG Seydialireis, and TCG Selmanreis—are currently under construction.

The six submarines of the class are planned for delivery to the Turkish Navy at one-year intervals beginning with the lead boat in 2023.

== Characteristics ==
The Reis-class submarines are Type 214 submarines featuring air-independent propulsion (AIP) using fuel cell technology. The boats are able to deploy heavyweight torpedoes, anti-ship missiles and to lay mines.

== Submarines in class ==
Name	Pennant	Builder	Laid down	Launched	Commissioned	Status	Note
Piri Reis	S-330	Gölcük Naval Shipyard	2015	March 2021	24 August 2024	In service	Commissioned.
Hızır Reis	S-331	Gölcük Naval Shipyard	2017	25 May 2023	27 November 2025	In service	Commissioned.
Murat Reis	S-332	Gölcük Naval Shipyard	2018	29 May 2025		Planned	Launched.
Aydın Reis	S-333	Gölcük Naval Shipyard	2019			Planned	Under construction.
Seydi Ali Reis	S-334	Gölcük Naval Shipyard	2020			Planned	Under construction.
Selman Reis	S-335	Gölcük Naval Shipyard	2022			Planned	Under construction.

== See also ==
Equivalent submarines of the same era

- U212 NFS
- Invincible class
- Kalvari class
- Nagapasa class
