= Oruç Reis-class submarine =

Submarine class

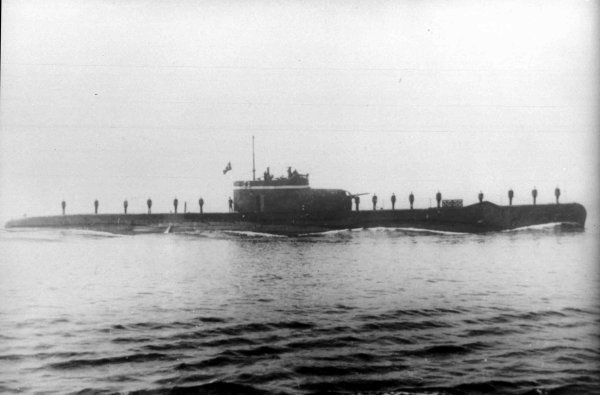
- Turkish submarine TCG Oruç Reis

Class overview
- Name: P611/Oruç Reis
- Operators: Royal Navy; Turkish Navy
- Preceded by: U class
- Succeeded by: V class
- Completed: 4
- Lost: 1
- Retired: 3

General characteristics
- Type: Submarine
- Displacement: 624 tons standard, 683 tons full load surfaced; 856 tons submerged
- Length: 64 m (210 ft)
- Beam: 6.81 m (22.3 ft)
- Draught: 3.61 m (11.8 ft)
- Propulsion: 2 shaft diesel-electric; Vickers diesels - 1,200 hp (890 kW); Electric motors - 780 hp (580 kW)
- Speed: 13.7 knots (25.4 km/h) surfaced; 8.4 knots (15.6 km/h) submerged
- Range: 2,500 nautical miles (4,630 km) at 10 knots (19 km/h)
- Complement: 40
- Armament: 5 × 21 in (533 mm) torpedo tubes - 4 bow internal, 1 stern external; 9 torpedoes; 1 × 3 in (76 mm) gun; 1 × 20 mm gun

The Oruç Reis-class submarines were ordered by the Turkish Navy from the British company Vickers in 1939. They were similar to the British S-class submarines, but slightly smaller. They had the S-class machinery but only four bow torpedo tubes. The four boats were requisitioned by the Royal Navy on the outbreak of World War II and fought in the British fleet as the P611 class. Two submarines were delivered to the Turks in 1942 in order to bolster Turkish strength against the threat from Nazi Germany and the remaining surviving submarine was delivered to the Turkish Navy after the end of the war in 1945. P615 had been sunk in 1943. The three Turkish boats were scrapped in 1957.

P614 and P615 appear in the film We Dive at Dawn as HMS Sea Tiger.

== Ships ==
All were built by Vickers in Barrow-in-Furness.

Construction data
Turkish name	Namesake	Royal Navy number	Laid Down	Launched	Commissioned	Fate
Burak Reis	Burak Reis	HMS P614	24 May 1939	19 October 1940	10 March 1942 (Royal Navy); 17 January 1946 (Turkish Navy)	Returned to Turkey 1945, Scrapped 1957
Murat Reis	Murat Reis	HMS P612	24 May 1939	20 July 1940	7 January 1942 (Royal Navy); 16 May 1942 (Turkish Navy)	Returned to Turkey May 1942, Scrapped 1957
Oruç Reis	Oruç Reis	HMS P611	24 May 1939	19 July 1940	1 December 1941 (Royal Navy); 9 May 1942 (Turkish Navy)	Returned to Turkey May 1942, Scrapped 1957
Uluç Ali Reis	Uluç Ali Reis	HMS P615	30 October 1939	1 November 1940	3 April 1942	Sunk by U-boat U-123 18 April 1943 near Sierra Leone

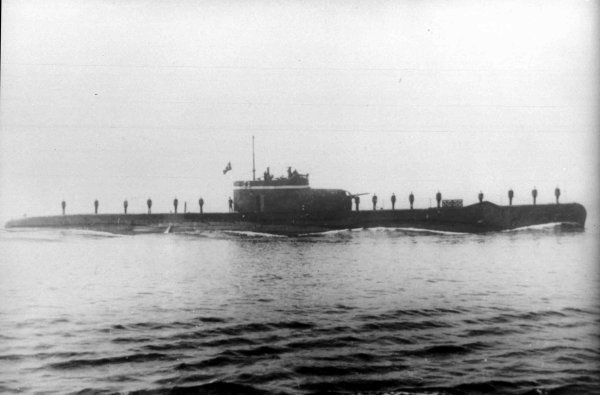
TCG Oruç Reis

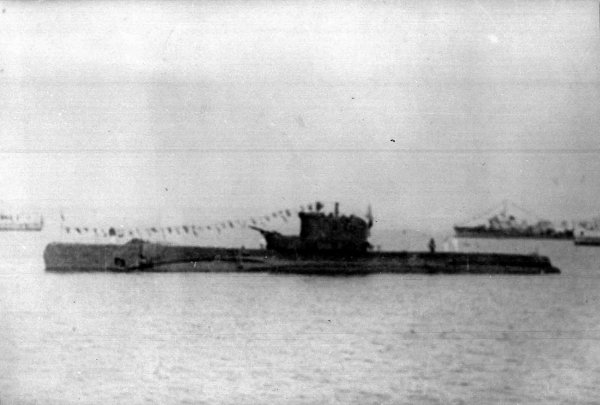
TCG Murat Reis

== See also ==
- HMS Agincourt A World War I warship paid for by Imperial Turkey but seized by the Royal Navy upon outbreak of war.
- HMS Erin Another World War I warship paid for by Imperial Turkey but seized by the Royal Navy upon outbreak of war.
