= Roy M. Davenport =

American rear admiral (1909–1987)

Roy Milton Davenport
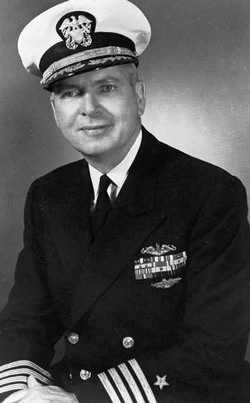
- Captain Roy Milton Davenport, c. 1950s
- Born: June 18, 1909; Kansas City, Kansas, U.S.
- Died: December 24, 1987 (aged 78); Laguna Hills, California, U.S.
- Military career
- Allegiance: United States
- Branch: United States Navy
- Service years: 1933–1959
- Rank: Rear Admiral
- Commands: USS General J. C. Breckinridge; USS Trepang; USS Haddock
- Conflicts: World War II; Korean War
- Awards: Navy Cross (5); Silver Star (2); Navy and Marine Corps Commendation Medal (2)

Rear Admiral Roy Milton Davenport (June 18, 1909 – December 24, 1987) was an American officer in the United States Navy. He is the first sailor to be awarded five Navy Crosses, the United States naval services' second highest decoration for valor. Davenport was awarded these military decorations while serving as a submarine commander in the Pacific during World War II.

Davenport made eleven submarine war patrols, six of them as a commanding officer. It was during these six patrols in command of the Gato-class submarine USS Haddock and the Balao-class submarine USS Trepang that he received five Navy Crosses, two Silver Stars, two Navy and Marine Corps Commendation Medals, two Presidential Unit Citations, Combat Action Ribbon, and the Navy Unit Commendation. He was also awarded the Submarine Combat Patrol Insignia with two silver star devices for a total of eleven successful war patrols. These are documented in his autobiography, Clean Sweep, 1986.

A student of Christian Science, Davenport was dubbed the "praying skipper" and was known for his daring attacks against Japanese ships, often executed on the surface to gain additional speed. In all, he was credited during the Pacific War with sinking 17 Japanese ships and damaging 10, but this was reduced to 8 by JANAC postwar evaluations. While none of the men under his command were lost, he and his crews experienced many close calls and escapes. He credited his religious faith for his successes.

== Early life and family ==
Davenport was born in Kansas City, Kansas, and grew up in the Midwest. In June 1933, he graduated from the United States Naval Academy as an ensign. In 1935, he married Jane Andre Gorham, who would be his wife for 52 years; together they had two daughters, Delia (Davenport) Gruenig and Bonnie (Davenport) Byhre.

== Naval career ==
Davenport's first naval assignment was on the battleship USS Texas. The next year he attended Submarine School in New London, Connecticut. Upon graduation he was temporarily assigned to the training ship USS R-2 until the USS Cachalot arrived on the East Coast to be re-engined. After some time in Panama, he arrived in Pearl Harbor in June 1939.

=== Outbreak of World War II ===
In 1941, Davenport was serving in USS Silversides, as executive officer under Lieutenant Commander Creed Burlingame. After four patrols aboard, Burlingame recommended Davenport for a command of his own.

Beyond the expected and usual depth charging after attacks on ships, there were close escapes. Once, a Japanese airplane dropped three bombs directly on Silversides. The sub survived; although during escape, it went into a hard dive with bow planes jammed, exceeding its design depth. At the last moment, Exec Davenport removed a cotter key, enabling the sub to level off to avoid being crushed. On another occasion, a torpedo, half stuck in the firing chamber required re-firing. If unsuccessfully re-fired, it could have sunk the sub. Another time, Davenport had to wrestle a pistol from a drunken gunner's mate who felt that he had been robbed in a dice game. The sailor was removed from the sub in a straitjacket.

=== USS Haddock ===
Davenport was given command of USS Haddock, replacing Commander Art Taylor, who was relieved at the orders of Admiral Robert English for circulating "subversive literature" (a poem critical of English and his staff). Haddock achieved three successful patrols; Davenport's first patrol in command was off the Palau Islands, sinking two confirmed ships, Toyo Maru and Arima Maru, for 9,200 tons. His wartime credit was one for 11,900. He was unable to close nearer than 12,000 yards (11,000 m) to the Japanese aircraft carriers Hiyō and Junyō. After 39 days at sea, Haddock went in for extensive refit to repair a defective, potentially lethal, conning tower. At a depth of 415 feet (126 m), it had almost imploded. To close the hatch to save the boat from sinking, Davenport hit the hatch with a sledgehammer. The conning tower held, and Haddock escaped.

On Davenport's second patrol, he returned to the Palaus, where he sank the 5,533-ton Saipan Maru, and on July 26, 1943 they fired a total of fifteen Mark XIV torpedoes at ranges between 2,000 and 4,000 yards (1,800 and 3,700 m) in four attacks, believing he scored one hit. Credited with one ship sunk for 10,900 tons and damage to another for 35,000 tons, he was awarded his first Navy Cross; this score was later corrected to one ship sunk at 5,500 tons.

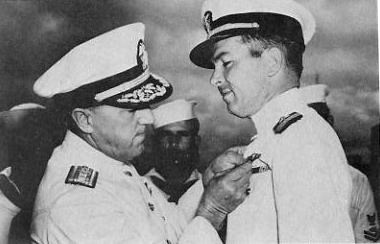
Vice Admiral Charles A. Lockwood, Commander Submarine Force Pacific Fleet, pinning a Silver Star on Davenport aboard USS Silversides

In August 1943, Davenport was dispatched to Truk, making a 27-day patrol that would earn him a second Navy Cross. He fired four torpedoes on a ship on September 15, claiming two hits and fire aboard the target, which nevertheless tried to ram, leading Davenport to fire two more "down the throat". On September 20, he encountered a large tanker, the 19,000-ton Tonan Maru II, and fired six torpedoes from 3,700 yards (3,400 m), claiming "at least three certain hits". On the night of September 21/22, he attacked another ship, missing with two torpedoes from 3,000 yards (2,700 m), and on the 23rd, firing a total of eight, his last, at another, claiming three hits. For his third patrol, he was credited with three ships sunk, a total of 39,200 tons.

Departing Pearl Harbor in October, he returned to Truk for another 27-day patrol, and on November 1/2, attacked a freighter and troopship on the surface firing four torpedoes at the freighter at 3,100 yards (2,800 m) and one at the troopship from 4,150 yards (3,790 m). The freighter was claimed to have sunk immediately, the troopship to have caught fire then settle. The next night, encountering three Japanese destroyers, Davenport fired four torpedoes at one of them from 2,000 yards (1,800 m), claiming a hit midships, and a sinking. And finally, on November 5/6, Haddock found two tankers, firing three bow torpedoes at each from 3,000 yards (2,700 m) and all four stern tubes at the escort. The stern shots all missed, but Davenport reported hits in both tankers. After reloading, he fired two more torpedoes at each, claiming both tankers sunk. The second Truk patrol earned Davenport credit for five ships and 32,600 tons, including the escort, plus damage to one for 4,000 tons. None were confirmed by postwar JANAC, while Davenport, backed by his executive officers, believe the Japanese attempted to deceive the Allies into thinking the tankers remained in service.

=== USS Trepang ===
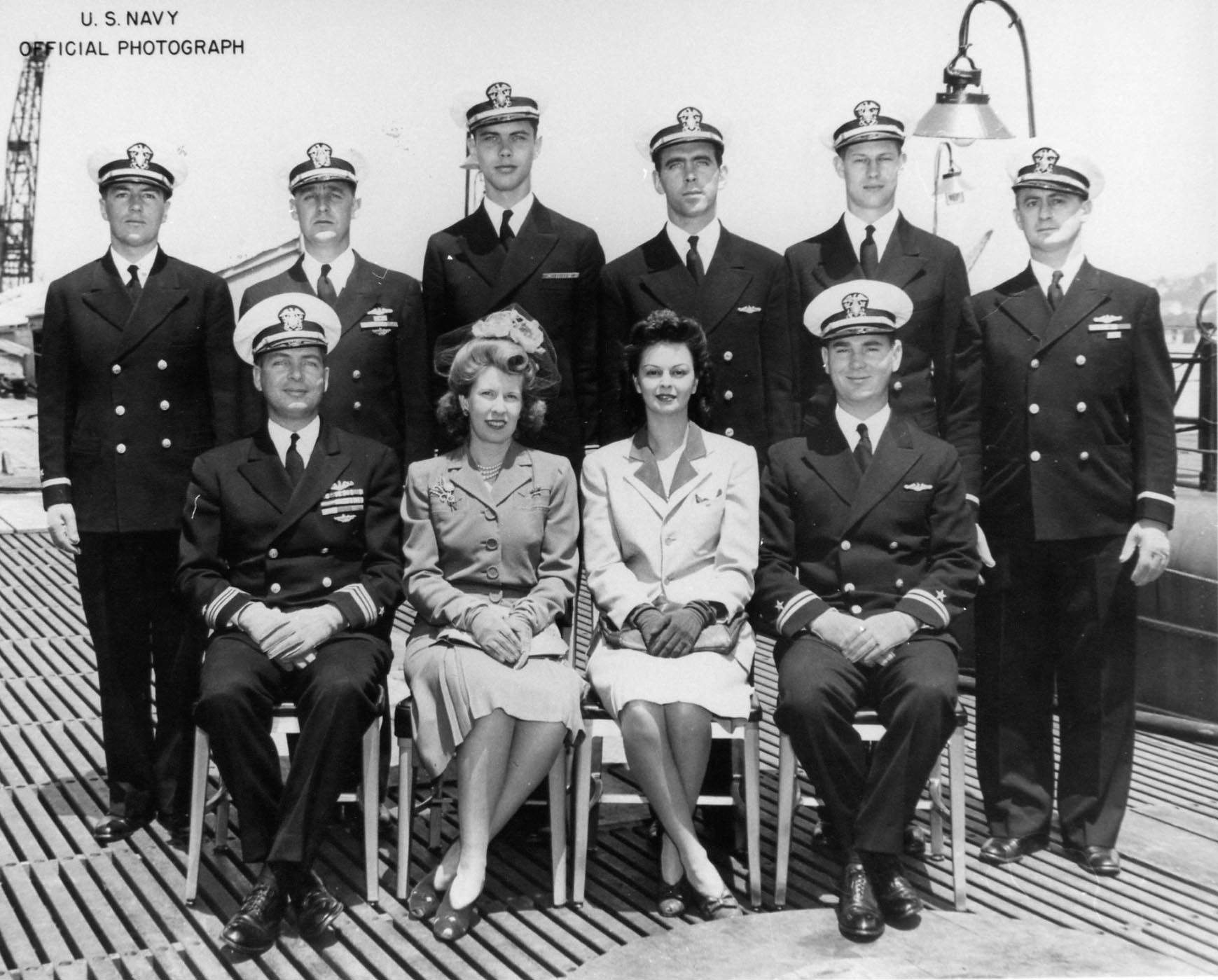
Roy M. Davenport (seated left) with other officers at the commissioning of Trepang, May 22, 1944. His wife, Jane Andre Davenport, is present as the ship sponsor

Afterward, "at his own request", Davenport was detached for a rest and new construction, and "Beetle" Roach was given Haddock. Davenport would return to duty with the new Balao class USS Trepang. On September 30, 1944 off Honshu, Davenport fired six torpedoes on two large tankers, a large freighter, and an escort, claiming a hit in one tanker; JANAC confirmed only sinking of a 750-ton freighter, Taknuan Maru.

Davenport weathered a typhoon and, on October 10/11, picked up a convoy of two tankers and one escort. Firing four stern tubes, he claimed three hits. No sinkings were confirmed in Japanese records. The next night, he fired four torpedoes at a Japanese landing craft, believing all missed. Postwar, he was credited with the 1,000-ton Transport No. 5. On October 12/13, lying 12 miles (19 km) off Iro Zaki, Davenport made radar contact with two ships, believing them at first to be aircraft carriers, then battleships, escorted by destroyers. He fired all six bow tubes at one "battleship". He claimed hits in one destroyer, suggesting it sank immediately, and at least one hit in the first "battleship". He then swung and fired all four stern tubes, his last remaining torpedoes, at the other "battleship"; all missed. Back in Majuro, he was credited with three ships of 22,300 tons and damage to a Yamashiro-class battleship for 29,300 tons, earning him a fourth Navy Cross.

On his next patrol to Luzon Strait, Davenport led a "wolfpack" called "Roy's Rangers" consisting of Trepang, James Fulp's Segundo, and Charles Brown's Razorback He fired twenty-two torpedoes in all, claiming four ships for 35,000 tons; this was reduced postwar to three for 13,000.

=== Later career and retirement ===
After completing this, his tenth war patrol, in December 1944, Davenport requested shore duty, and became a maritime engineering instructor at Annapolis. Except for those who earned the Medal of Honor, such as Dick O'Kane, he was the Submarine Force's most decorated member.

Davenport remained in the Navy after the war and saw "in theater" service during the Korean War. His last assignment was as commanding officer of the troop transport USS General J. C. Breckinridge from 1958 to August 1959 after which he retired from the navy after 26 years of service. Upon retirement, he was promoted to rear admiral in recognition of his combat decorations.

Davenport died on Christmas Eve 1987 at the age of 78.

== Television appearance ==
In 1954, the popular television program, This Is Your Life with host Ralph Edwards, recounted his wartime events with close family appearing with him. Davenport's cousin, General Maxwell D. Taylor, the Chairman of the Joint Chiefs of Staff under President John F. Kennedy, did not appear as only immediate family and those who interacted in Davenport's wartime adventures, were invited.

== Military awards and decorations ==
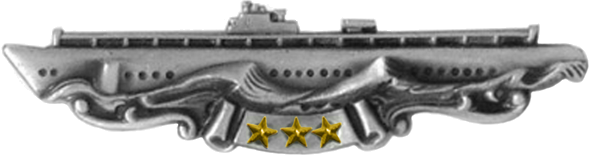
| Submarine Warfare insignia (Officer) |
| Submarine Combat Patrol insignia with two silver stars |

| Navy Cross with four 5/16" Gold stars |
| Silver Star Medal with one 5/16" Gold Star |
| Navy and Marine Corps Commendation Medal with one 5/16" Gold Star |
| Combat Action Ribbon |
| Navy Presidential Unit Citation with two 3/16" bronze stars |
| Navy Unit Commendation |
| American Defense Service Medal with Base Clasp (3/16" bronze star) |
| American Campaign Medal |
| Asiatic-Pacific Campaign Medal with four 3/16" bronze stars |
| National Defense Service Medal |
| Korean Service Medal |
| Philippine Liberation Medal |
| United Nations Service Medal |
| Navy Rifle Marksmanship Ribbon |
| Navy Pistol Marksmanship Ribbon |

=== Navy Cross citations ===
==== First ====
For extraordinary heroism as Commanding Officer of a United States Submarine during operations against enemy Japanese forces in the Pacific Area. Throughout numerous hazardous war patrols in enemy-infested waters, Lieutenant Commander Davenport pressed home his attacks with cool and courageous determination and despite intense and persistent hostile opposition, succeeded in sinking over 10,500 tons of enemy shipping and damaging over 35,500 tons. His aggressive fighting spirit, inspiring leadership and the splendid efficiency of the men in his command contributed immeasurably to the success of our operations in this vital area and were in keeping with the highest traditions of the United States Naval Service.

==== Second ====
For extraordinary heroism as Commanding Officer of a United States Submarine while that vessel was engaged in an aggressive and successful patrol against enemy Japanese in the Pacific War Area. Although operating in the presence of formidable concentrations of anti-submarine vessels, Lieutenant Commander Davenport pressed home a series of vigorous and persistent attacks which resulted in the sinking or damaging of an important amount of hostile shipping. Despite severe countermeasures on the part of the enemy, he brought his ship through many perilous encounters and his crew home without material damage or loss of life. His expert seamanship and cool courage in the face of great personal danger were in keeping with the highest traditions of the United States Naval Service.

==== Third ====
For extraordinary heroism as Commanding Officer of the U.S.S. HADDOCK during the Seventh War Patrol in enemy Japanese-controlled waters in the Pacific War Area. With superb tactical skill, Commander Davenport maneuvered his ship into striking position and in a daring surface torpedo attack against a hostile destroyer search group, sank one of the Japanese warships then, during the ensuing confusion, carried out a successful surface retirement. Contacting two heavily escorted enemy convoys, he and his gallant command delivered accurate and devastating attacks against the hostile vessels, sinking a large amount of Japanese shipping. Commander Davenport’s inspiring leadership and indomitable fighting spirit were in keeping with the highest traditions of the United States Naval Service.

==== Fourth ====
For extraordinary heroism as Commanding Officer of the U.S.S. TREPANG during the First War Patrol of that vessel in enemy waters. Effectively covering wide areas of the enemy’s shipping routes, Commander Davenport tracked Japanese surface forces with relentless determination, skillfully developing his contacts into highly aggressive torpedo attacks. Boldly launching his fire against hostile escorted convoys, he directed his command in the destruction of several important enemy vessels and continued his vigorous tactics by a night surface attack against a Japanese task force to sink or damage severely combatant ships of heavy fire power and vital to the enemy’s sustained prosecution of the war. His valiant ship-handling in evading severe enemy countermeasures despite the TREPANG’s inferior speed and highly phosphorescent seas and the gallant fighting spirit of the entire ship’s company reflect the highest credit upon Commander Davenport and the United States Naval Service.

==== Fifth ====
For extraordinary heroism as Commanding Officer of the U.S.S. TREPANG during the Second War Patrol of that vessel in enemy Japanese-controlled waters. Daringly penetrating a strong hostile escort screen to deliver a series of night surface attacks, Commander Davenport launched his torpedoes into an escorted convoy, holding to his targets grimly in the face of heavy countermeasures and sinking an important amount of Japanese tonnage. During this excellently planned and brilliantly executed engagement, the TREPANG effectively coordinated her efforts with other submarines and, as a result of the combined firepower of these gallant ships, contributed to the destruction of the entire convoy within a period of three hours. A courageous and expert seaman, forceful and inspiring in his leadership, Commander Davenport, as Group Commander, was largely responsible for the outstanding success of this vital and hazardous mission. His gallant conduct and the exceptional combat readiness of his command reflect the highest credit upon Commander Davenport and the United States Naval Service.

== See also ==
- Samuel David Dealey
- Eugene B. Fluckey
- Chesty Puller
