= Hoga (YT-146) =

United States Navy tugboat

Coordinates: 34.752273°N 92.266877°W

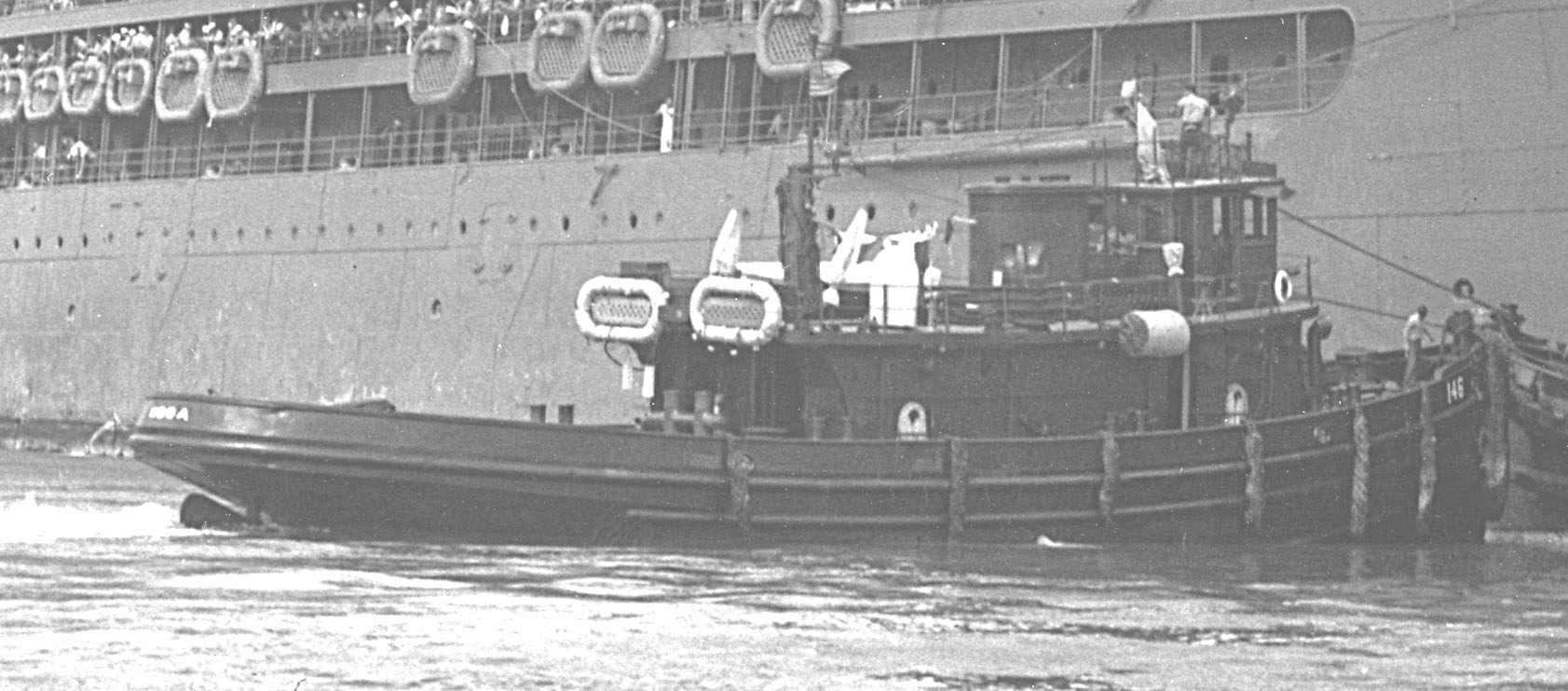
- Hoga at Pearl Harbor in 1942

History

United States
- Awarded: 1 June 1940
- Builder: Consolidated Shipbuilding Corporation
- Laid down: 25 July 1940
- Launched: 31 December 1940
- Acquired: 1 May 1941
- In service: 22 May 1941
- Out of service: July 1996
- Renamed: Port of Oakland (1948); City of Oakland
- Reclassified: YTB (15 May 1944); YTM (1962)
- Stricken: 12 July 1996
- Status: Museum ship

General characteristics
- Class & type: Woban-class district harbor tug
- Displacement: 325 tons
- Length: 100 ft (30 m)
- Beam: 25 ft (7.6 m)
- Draft: 9 ft 7 in (2.92 m)
- USS Hoga (City of Oakland) (Tug)
- U.S. National Register of Historic Places
- U.S. National Historic Landmark
- Built: 1941
- Architect: Consolidated Shipbuilding Corp.
- NRHP reference No.: 89001429

Significant dates
- Added to NRHP: 30 June 1989
- Designated NHL: 30 June 1989

Hoga (YT-146/YTB-146/YTM-146) is a United States Navy Woban-class district harbor tug named after the Sioux Indian word for "fish." After World War II, the tug was known as Port of Oakland and then City of Oakland when she was a fireboat in Oakland, California.

Authorized on 18 June 1940, she was built by the Consolidated Shipbuilding Corporation in Morris Heights, New York. Her keel was laid on 25 July 1940. Launched on 31 December 1940, she was christened Hoga (YT-146). Placed in service on 22 May 1941 at Norfolk, Virginia, Hoga was assigned to the 14th Naval District at Pearl Harbor. She made the trip there by way of the Panama Canal, San Diego, and San Pedro.

At Pearl Harbor, Hoga was berthed at the Yard Craft Dock, and worked moving cargo lighters and assisting ships in and out of berths. Like other YTs, she carried firefighting equipment. Hoga was present during the Attack on Pearl Harbor. The last surviving vessels from the attack are museum ships, the US Coast Guard cutter WHEC-37 (formerly USCGC Taney) in the Inner Harbor of Baltimore, Maryland, and Hoga at the Arkansas Inland Maritime Museum.

== At Pearl Harbor ==
Hoga was moored with other yard service craft near the drydocks at 1010 Dock when Pearl Harbor was attacked by Japanese forces on the morning of 7 December 1941.

Hoga was underway within ten minutes of the first strike. Steaming out into the harbor, she picked up two men in the water, landed them on the deck, and proceeded to the burning ships along Battleship Row. At the end, lay the shattered hulk of USS Arizona. Moored to Arizona was the badly damaged repair ship USS Vestal. Throwing lines to the stricken repair ship, Hoga helped pull Vestal away from Arizona at 8:30. Pulling in the tow lines that had been chopped free by Vestal's panicked crew, Hoga ran to the assistance of the minelayer USS Oglala, flagship of Rear Admiral William Rea Furlong, commanding Minecraft, Battle Force. As she reached Oglala at 8:50, Hoga was passed by the battleship USS Nevada, then making a run for the open sea.

As the first wave of planes struck at 7:50, Nevada, moored near Arizona, had partial steam up. At 8:03, the ship took a torpedo hit near frame 40 and began to list. Counterflooding kept Nevada from capsizing as her anti-aircraft batteries opened up on the attacking planes, shooting down the plane that had dropped the torpedo. The commanding officer, Captain F. W. Scanland, was not aboard; the senior officer was Lieutenant Commander J. F. Thomas, USNR. Thomas, aided by another junior officer, conned the ship away as burning oil from the destroyed Arizona began to threaten Nevada. Just as the second wave of planes struck, the damaged Nevada got underway at 8:45, her officers hoping to escape the trap and run for the open sea through the narrow harbor entrance. The Japanese "recognized a golden double opportunity to sink a battleship and at the same time bottle up Pearl Harbor." The planes concentrated their attack on Nevada, which continued running, bombs crashing around her and on her forward deck and superstructure. At 9:07, a second "hail of bombs" rained on the ship, one striking the forecastle. By 9:10, Nevada was sinking, and she was grounded on Hospital Point to avoid going down in the channel.

Meanwhile, Hoga, with another vessel, was assisting Oglala. Damaged by the detonation of a torpedo against the cruiser USS Helena, moored next to Oglala, the listing minesweeper required towing to clear the field of fire for Helena. As the sinking Oglala was moved aft of Helena by Hoga, "Admiral Furlong saw the Nevada 'give quite a heave,' and reflected to himself 'Well...there she is in the channel and there is going to be trouble if that ship sinks in the channel.' So he sent the two tugs that had been assisting Oglala to help nose the Nevada over toward Hospital Point."

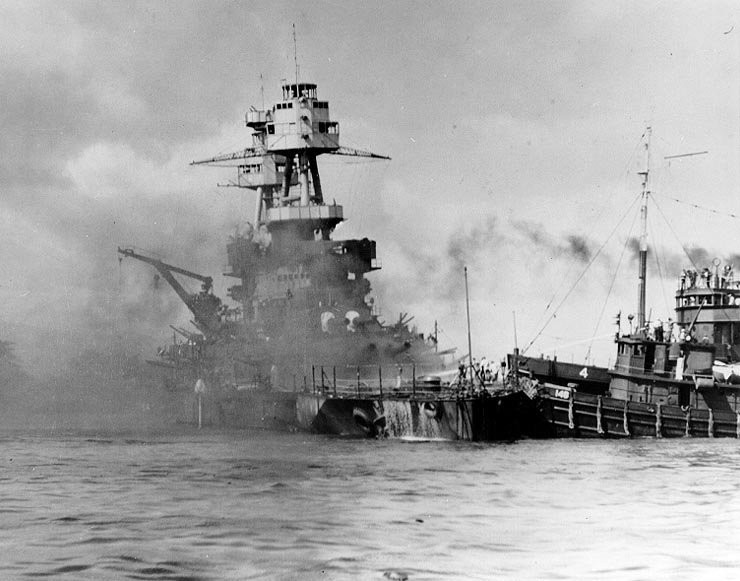
Hoga pushes the sinking USS Nevada to safety in soft sand after the attack on Pearl Harbor.

Hoga then worked with the other tug, YT-130, to pull the battleship free and move her to the western side of the harbor entrance, where by 10:45 she settled as Hoga poured water onto the burning deck and into the virtually destroyed forward section. Tied to the port bow, Hoga worked on a raging forecastle fire with the pilothouse monitor and four hose lines for over an hour before retiring.

From Nevada, Hoga returned to Battleship Row, fighting fires on USS Maryland, USS Tennessee, and finally Arizona. Hoga worked the Arizona fire from 16:00 hours on Sunday until 13:00 hours on Tuesday, 9 December. Following 72 continuous hours of firefighting, Hoga remained on active duty through the rest of the week, patrolling the harbor, assisting in body removal, and searching for Japanese submarines believed to be hiding in the harbor. The actions of the tug's skipper and crew did not go unrecognized. In February 1942, Admiral Chester Nimitz, CINCPAC, commended McManus, his men, and their tug for a job well done:

For distinguished service in line of your profession as Commanding Officer of the Navy Yard Tug Hoga, and efficient action and disregard of your own personal safety during the attack ... When another ship was disabled and appeared to be out of control, with serious fires on the fore part of that ship, you moored your tug to her bow and assisted materially in extinguishing the fires. When it was determined that the damaged ship should be beached, as there was serious danger of her sinking in the channel, you assisted in the beaching operations in an outstanding manner. Furthermore, each member of the crew of the Hoga functioned in a most efficient manner and exhibited commendable disregard of personal danger throughout the operations.

Following the Japanese attack, Hoga, along with other yard tugs and support craft, was pressed into additional duty cleaning debris from the harbor and the salvage efforts that began immediately on the sunken and battle-damaged vessels. This effort continued through the war years; Hoga was an active participant in this as well as in the continuing function of Pearl Harbor as an active Navy Base with increased responsibilities and duties as the springboard for the eventual reconquest of occupied Pacific islands and territories and victory over Japan. During the war Hoga was redesignated as a YTB (Yard Tug, Large) on 15 May 1944. Salvage work and heavy duty continued after the war, but in 1948, Hoga was transferred on loan to the Port of Oakland for use as a fireboat through the efforts of Congressman George P. Miller.

== Fireboat Service in Oakland ==
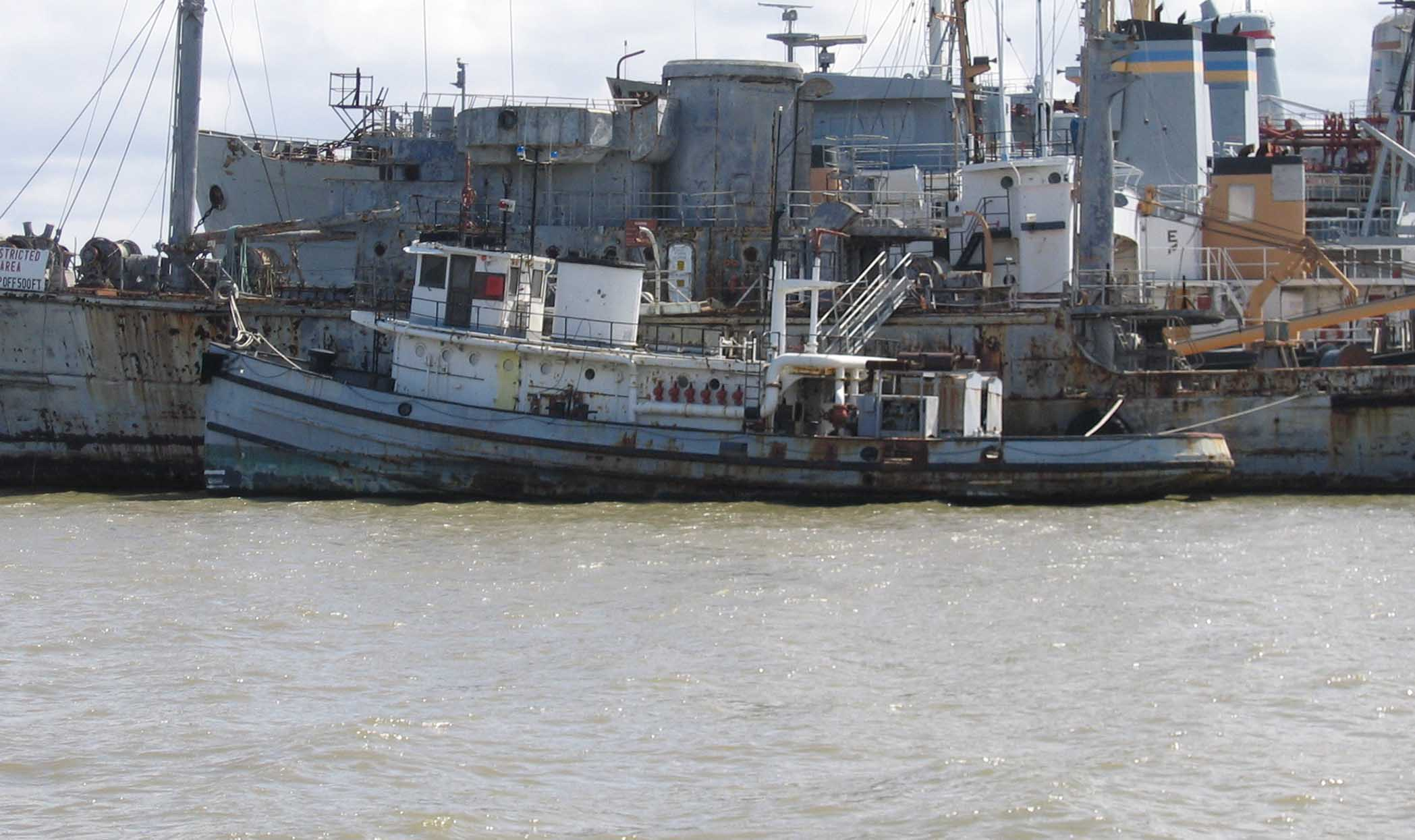
Hoga, laid up with the Suisun Bay Reserve Fleet in March 2006

Oakland, one of California's most active ports, surpassing her one-time rival San Francisco after the latter's nearly century-long reign as principal American port on the Pacific, was without municipal fireboat protection until Hoga's arrival. Heavy shipping of war material from the Oakland Army Base, an active part of the San Francisco Port of Embarkation, the presence of oil tankers calling at East Bay refineries, and the United States Naval Air Station at nearby Alameda contributed to the wartime significance of the port of Oakland. In April 1948, it was announced that Oakland would receive Hoga by loan from the Navy.

The arrangement between the Port of Oakland and the City Council by which the vessel was operated included Port-financed alterations to increase the pumping capacity from 4,000 to 10,000 US gal/min (0.25 to 0.63 m^{3}/s), a berth, new firehouse, and partial defrayment of the salaries of the crew. The city would operate and pay part of the fireboat crew's salaries. According to Mayor Joseph E. Smith, "by this arrangement Oakland will receive excellent fire protection along its valuable waterfront properties, and the cost of the service will be distributed between the City and the Port." Arriving in May, Hoga was brought by a Navy crew from Treasure Island to the Grove Street Pier in Oakland, where transfer papers were signed on 28 May 1948.

Reconditioned at a cost of $73,000 in 1948 by Pacific Coast Engineering at Pacific Drydock and Repair in Oakland, the fireboat, now christened Port of Oakland (later changed to City of Oakland) entered service in July 1948:

The fireboat is berthed at the foot of Broadway in Oakland, immediately adjacent to a firehouse from which she can draw her crew of seven hosemen and a Battalion Chief, and have them aboard within a very few minutes. A regularly licensed pilot and marine engineer continually man the fireboat. Under this arrangement the Port of Oakland can be fully manned and on her way at 14 knots (26 km/h) speed almost immediately.

The day after formal commissioning, Port of Oakland was called into service to help combat a shipboard fire on the freighter Hawaiian Rancher.

In her 40-year career as an Oakland fireboat, the vessel has combated numerous shipboard fires, waterfront blazes, rescued persons in the water, and served as a tour boat for President Jimmy Carter during a 35-minute tour of the port on 3 July 1980. One highlight of the President's visit was his playfully aiming of City of Oakland's bow monitor at the press boat. The fireboat was moved to a new berth at Jack London Square on 7 December 1982. The most recent adventure was responding to the burning tanker SS Puerto Rican in the rough seas outside the Golden Gate Bridge on 3 November 1984. The decline of large wooden warehouses and piers, better shipboard fire control, and the crowding of the harbor with smaller pleasure craft has limited the use of the fireboat, and the Port of Oakland, like other major ports, considered a smaller, more maneuverable vessel to meet the needs of the 21st century waterfront.

== Museum ship ==
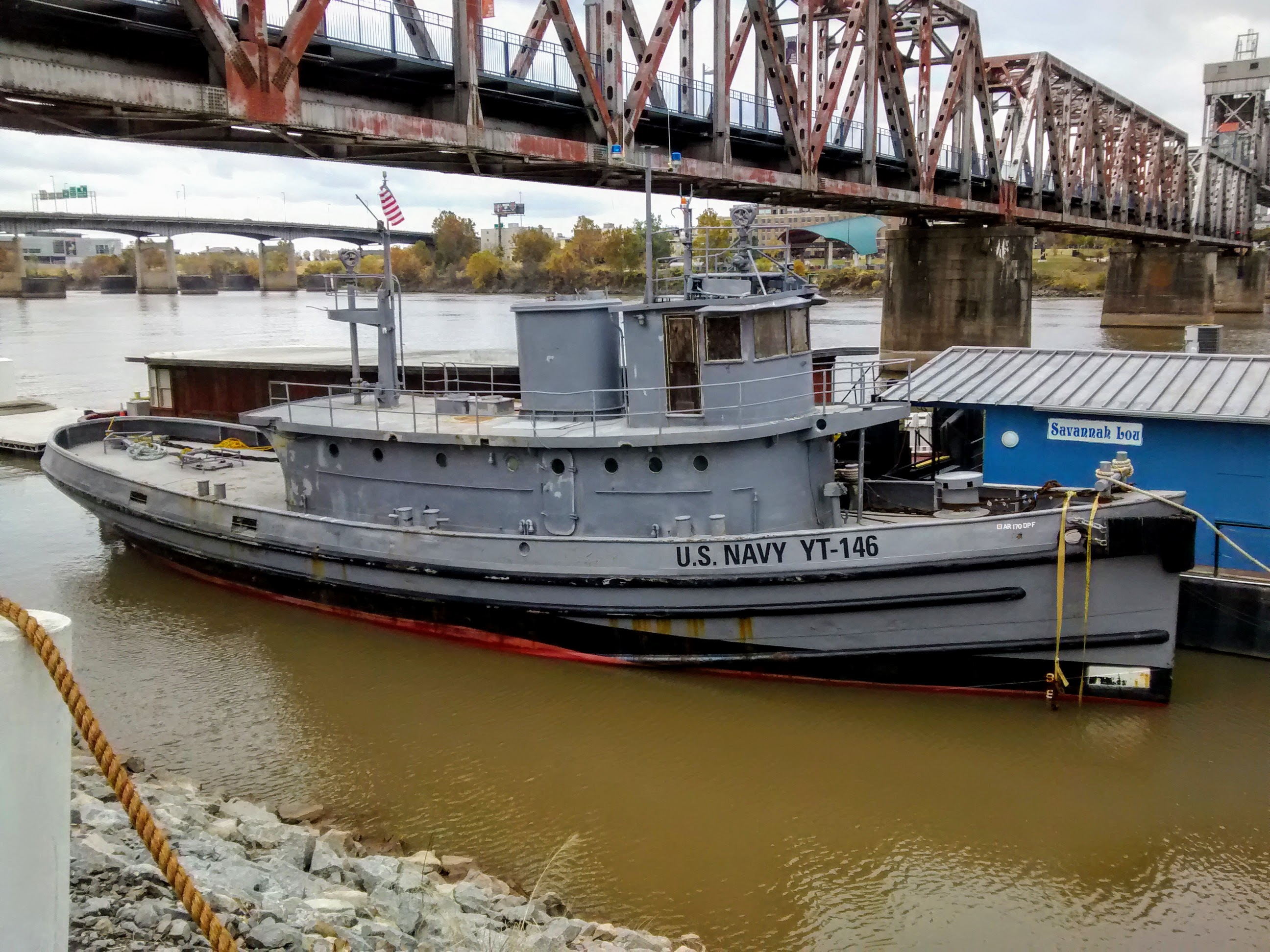
YT-146 on display at the Arkansas Inland Maritime Museum

The ship was declared a National Historic Landmark in 1989.

The City of Oakland returned Hoga to the Navy in 1994 at Treasure Island, where she was subsequently moved to the nearby Maritime Administration's Suisun Bay Reserve Fleet as part of the National Defense Reserve Fleet. After several years of being available for donation, the Navy selected the City of North Little Rock, Arkansas among four other competing applications. A donation transfer contract was signed on 29 July 2005, whereupon ownership of Hoga was transferred to the City of North Little Rock. Hoga remained at Suisun Bay until mid-2012. Hoga arrived at Vallejo's Mare Island drydocks (Allied Defense Recycling (ADR) facility) on 31 July 2012 to start work to make the tug seaworthy for its journey to Arkansas.

Hoga arrived at the Arkansas Inland Maritime Museum on 23 November 2015. After renovations she will be open for public tours. At the museum she is part of vessels that are bookends for the US in World War II, with Hoga from the beginning of the war at Pearl Harbor, alongside the submarine USS Razorback which was present in Tokyo Bay at the surrender of Japan.

== Awards ==
- American Defense Service Medal
- Asiatic-Pacific Campaign Medal with one battle star
- World War II Victory Medal

== See also ==
- List of National Historic Landmarks in Arkansas
- National Register of Historic Places listings in Pulaski County, Arkansas
