= S78 =

S78 may refer to:

- S78 (New York City bus) serving Staten Island
- County Route S78 (California)
- Greek submarine Poseidon (S-78)
