= Greek submarine Poseidon =

At least two ships of the Hellenic Navy have borne the name Poseidon (Greek: Ποσειδών), after the ancient Greek god of the sea Poseidon:

- Greek submarine Poseidon (S-78) a Gato-class submarine launched as USS Lapon in 1942 she was renamed on transfer to Greece in 1957. She was stricken in 1976.
- Greek submarine Poseidon (S-116) a Type 209 submarine commissioned in 1979.
