= Arkansas Inland Maritime Museum =

Museum in North Little Rock, Arkansas

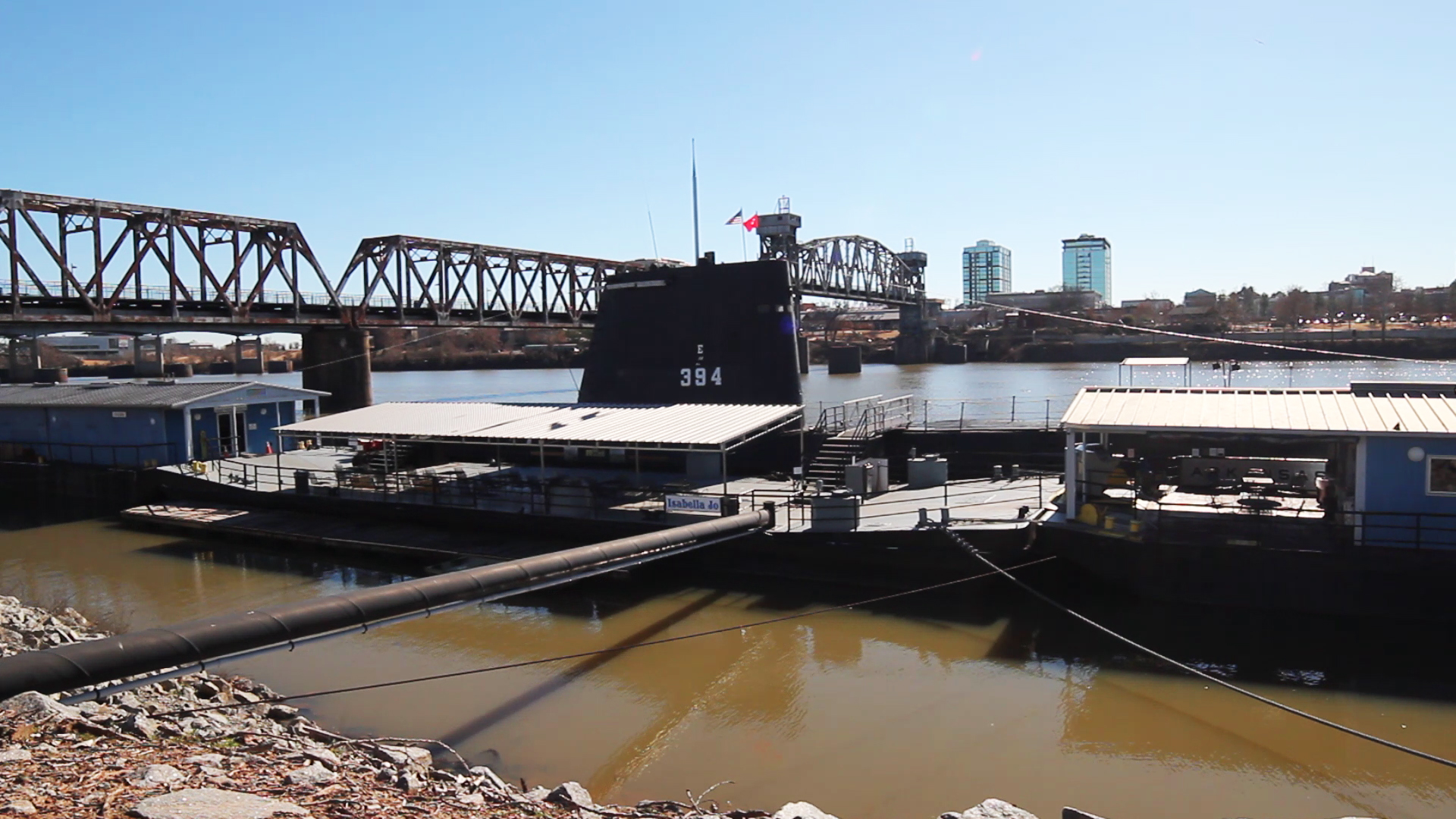
- Arkansas Inland Maritime Museum and USS Razorback in the Arkansas River
- Established: 2005
- Location: 120 Riverfront Park Drive; North Little Rock, Arkansas
- Coordinates: 34.752592°N 92.2667°W
- Type: Maritime museum
- Website: aimmuseum.org

The Arkansas Inland Maritime Museum is a maritime museum located at 120 Riverfront Park Drive, North Little Rock, Arkansas which opened on May 15, 2005. The museum's collection includes artifacts from multiple vessels from the state's history, as well as two World War 2 vessels.

== History ==
The genesis of the museum came in 2001, when a group of U.S. Navy veterans started efforts to bring the USS Razorback back to America from Turkey after its decommission from the Turkish Navy. The veterans approached North Little Rock Mayor Hayes and secured his support.

The museum was opened in July 2005 after the arrival of the USS Razorback a month prior. The museum consists of three Army Corp of Engineer barges, which hold the museum, waiting room, and observation deck. In November 2013, a memorial to the submarine USS Scorpion was added to the grounds of the museum.

== Exhibits ==
=== USS Razorback (SS-394) ===
The museum's primary exhibit is USS Razorback, a Balao-class submarine, which served during World War II (commissioned in 1944) and then served in the Korean, Vietnam and Cold Wars. The submarine was eventually transferred to the Turkish Navy (serving as TCG Muratreis until 2001) before returning to the US to become a museum ship. It is arguably the longest-serving submarine still existing in the world, and was commissioned by the United States and Turkey for 57 years of active duty (Taiwan has two World War II-era submarines that have been continuously in service since 1945 and 1946 first with the US Navy and then the Republic of China Navy, which are ROCS Hai Shih and ROCS Hai Pao). The museum provides tours of Razorback and even offers sleepovers on the submarine.

=== Hoga (YT-146) ===
The museum's collection also includes the Hoga, a US Navy tugboat. This vessel, which survived and responded to the Attack on Pearl Harbor, was acquired by the museum on 28 November 2015.

The museum has vessels that are bookends for the US in World War II, with Hoga from the beginning of the war at Pearl Harbor, alongside Razorback which was present in Tokyo Bay at the surrender of Japan.

=== USS Arkansas (BB-33) ===
The museum has an exhibit on the World War 1 Dreadnought, including the ship's bell and officer's china. The USS Arkansas was active in the U.S. Navy for 34 years, having seen combat at the occupation of Vera Cruz and Operation Overlord.

=== USS Arkansas (CGN 41) ===
The museum has an exhibit on the nuclear-powered cruiser USS Arkansas, including the ship's bell and anchor.

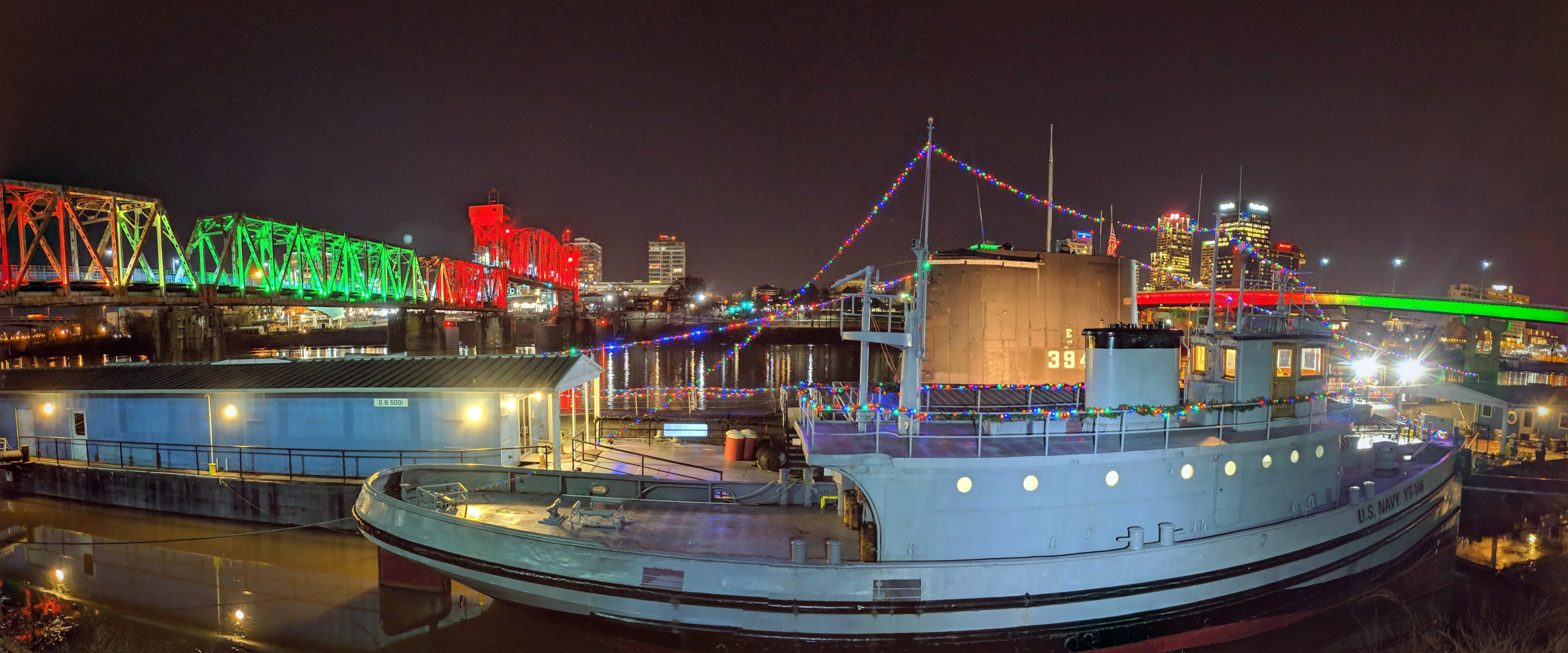
Starboard view of the tugboat Hoga

== See also ==
- List of maritime museums in the United States
- USS Razorback
