= Japanese cargo ship Mimasaka Maru (1944) =

History

Empire of Japan
- Name: Mimasaka Maru
- Builder: Ishikawajima Shipbuilding & Engineering Co. Ltd. Tokyo
- Laid down: 1943
- Launched: January 9, 1944
- Sponsored by: Nippon Yusen Kabushiki Kaisha, Tokyo
- Completed: February 6, 1944
- Identification: 51274
- Fate: Sunk, 9 April 1944
- Notes: Call sign: JNVS

General characteristics
- Type: Cargo ship
- Tonnage: 4,667 grt (13,215 m^{3}) standard
- Length: 112.00 m (367 ft 5 in) o/a
- Beam: 15.80 m (51 ft 10 in)
- Draught: 9.10 m (29 ft 10 in)
- Speed: 11.5 knots

Mimasaka Maru (Japanese: 美作丸) was a Japanese cargo ship during World War II.

== History ==
She was laid down in 1943 at the Tokyo shipyard of Ishikawajima Shipbuilding & Engineering Co. Ltd., for the benefit of Nippon Yusen Kabushiki Kaisha, Tokyo. She was one of 18 Wartime Standard Type B cargo ships laid down in 1943–1944 and one of seven built by Tokyo Ishikawajima (Bizen Maru (備前丸) Kokuyo Maru (國陽丸), Bicchu Maru (備中丸), Mino Maru (美濃丸), Miho Maru (美保丸), Mimasaka Maru (美作丸), and Miyama Maru (美山丸)). She was launched on January 9, 1944, and completed on February 6, 1944. On April 9, 1944, she was torpedoed and sunk by the American submarine USS Seahorse near the Mariana Islands.
