= USS General J. C. Breckinridge =

US Navy troop transport ship

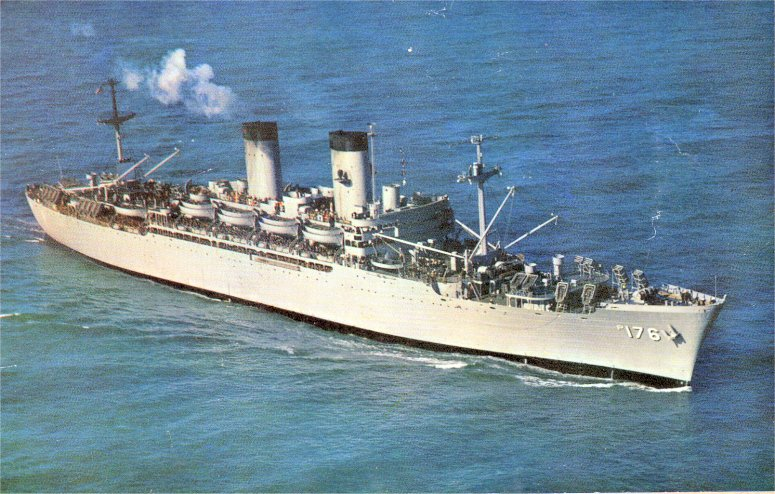
- USS General J. C. Breckinridge (T-AP-176) underway

History

United States
- Name: USS General J. C. Breckinridge
- Namesake: General James Carson Breckinridge, US Marine Corps
- Builder: Federal Shipbuilding & Drydock
- Launched: 18 March 1945
- Sponsored by: Mrs Dorothy T. Breckinridge
- Commissioned: 30 June 1945
- Reclassified: T-AP-176 (1 October 1949)
- Stricken: 1 December 1966
- Identification: MC hull type P2-S2-R2
- Honors and awards: Four service stars for Korean War service and one for the Vietnam War
- Fate: Scrapped 1988, Taiwan

General characteristics
- Class & type: General John Pope class transport
- Displacement: 11,450 tons (lt); 20,175 tons fully laden
- Length: 622 feet 7 inches (189.76 m)
- Beam: 75 feet 6 inches (23.01 m)
- Draft: 25 feet 6 inches (7.77 m)
- Installed power: 17,000 shp
- Propulsion: turbo-electric transmission, twin screw
- Speed: 21 knots (39 km/h)
- Capacity: 5,289
- Complement: 466
- Armament: 4 x single 5"/38 caliber dual purpose guns, 4 x 40mm guns, 20 x single 20mm guns

USS General J. C. Breckinridge (AP-176) was a troopship that served with the United States Navy in World War II, the Korean War and the Vietnam War. In October 1949 she was redesignated T-AP-176 but retained her Navy crew. Her namesake was United States Marine Corps Lieutenant General James Carson Breckinridge (1877–1942), who was the grandson of John Cabell Breckinridge, who served as Vice President of the United States from 1857 to 1861.

USS General J. C. Breckinridge, a General John Pope class troop transport, was built under United States Maritime Commission contract by the Federal Shipbuilding and Drydock Company at Kearny, New Jersey.

== World War II ==
She was commissioned with a United States Coast Guard crew in June 1945 and was en route to Marseille on her first operational voyage when the surrender of Japan ended World War II.

== Peacetime service ==
The transport made four more voyages to France to bring troops home, then was transferred to the Pacific, arriving at San Francisco in January 1946. A Navy crew replaced her Coast Guard crew there in February, probably after she was selected as one of six ships of her class to be retained in the postwar commissioned fleet. Following five trans-Pacific voyages, between October 1946 and January 1947 General J. C. Breckinridge was then converted at Philadelphia for peacetime employment, with special facilities for military dependents. She retained her armament but lost some of her lifeboats. Breckinridge then returned to the Pacific where she maintained a busy schedule of voyages between the west coast of the United States and numerous points in the Western Pacific.

In April 1948, the ship destroyed two floating mines in the San Francisco-Hawaii shipping lanes with gunfire, one 990 miles off the coast and the other 545 miles. They were among more than a dozen sighted recently off the Pacific coast and were thought to be remnants of Japanese mine fields torn loose by storms in the Aleutians.

In October 1949 all the ships in the Naval Transportation Service were reassigned to the newly created Military Sea Transportation Service (MSTS). As a ship, operationally subordinate to MSTS she was redesignated T-AP-176, but because she was a commissioned vessel with a Navy, not civilian, crew, General J. C. Breckinridge retained the designation "USS" instead of becoming "USNS."

== Korean War ==
In July 1950, immediately after the outbreak of the Korean War, General J. C. Breckinridge was reconverted to a troop transport at San Francisco and in August carried troops from Seattle to Yokosuka, Japan. She was diverted from her return voyage to support the assault on Inchon, where she arrived with fresh troops the day after the landing. In early November 1950 she sailed from Ft. Mason near San Francisco to Moji, Japan carrying about 3000 ground personnel of the 452nd USAFR Bomb Wing and later in that month assisted in the evacuation of Wonsan, and in December she helped evacuate Hungnam.

General J. C. Breckinridge made two more troop voyages in the war in Korea and then returned to regular MSTS transport duty, carrying both military and civilian passengers throughout the Pacific area. In 1955 she was again modified, losing her armament and receiving additional lifeboats. She remained an active part of the MSTS nucleus fleet as one of its few commissioned ships until December 1965, when she was inactivated and turned over to the Maritime Administration for layup in its reserve fleet.

From 1958 to 1959, Breckinridge was commanded by five time Navy Cross recipient Captain Roy M. Davenport. Davenport earned the decorations as a submarine commander during World War II and was the first person and the only sailor to receive five Navy Crosses.

== Vietnam War ==
Breckinridge played a small role in the Vietnam War in 1965 and received a service star for her service there. She landed troops off the coast of Vũng Tàu in Vietnam in May 1965. In June 1965 she landed troops at Cam Ranh Bay, Nha Trang and Qui Nhon.

Breckenridge also made at least one other voyage to South Vietnam in 1965, dropping off troops at Cam Ranh Bay and Qui Nhon (and perhaps other ports) from 11 to 17 September. Point of departure was Oakland, California, on or about 10 August.

== Decommission ==
General J. C. Breckinridge was stricken from the Naval Vessel Register and permanently transferred to the Maritime Administration in December 1966. The Maritime Administration sold her in August 1987 to a Japanese firm for scrapping.

== Awards ==
General J. C. Breckinridge received the following awards -

- European-African-Middle Eastern Campaign Medal
- World War II Victory Medal
- Navy Occupation Medal with "ASIA" clasp
- China Service Medal
- National Defense Service Medal with star
- Korean Service Medal with four battle stars
- Vietnam Service Medal with one campaign star
- Korean Presidential Unit Citation
- United Nations Korea Medal
- Korean War Service Medal
- Republic of Vietnam Campaign Medal
