= Japanese cargo ship Miho Maru (1943) =

History

Empire of Japan
- Name: Miho Maru
- Builder: Ishikawajima Shipbuilding & Engineering Co. Ltd. Tokyo
- Laid down: 1943
- Launched: 1943
- Sponsored by: Nippon Yusen Kabushiki Kaisha, Tokyo
- Completed: 20 December 1943
- Identification: 51272
- Fate: Sunk,
- Notes: Call sign: JNVT

General characteristics
- Type: Cargo ship
- Tonnage: 4,667 GRT standard
- Length: 112.00 m (367 ft 5 in) o/a
- Beam: 15.80 m (51 ft 10 in)
- Draught: 9.10 m (29 ft 10 in)
- Installed power: 2,000 shp (1,500 kW)
- Speed: 11.5 knots (21.3 km/h; 13.2 mph)

Miho Maru (Japanese: 美保丸) was a Japanese cargo ship of during World War II.

== History ==
She was laid down in 1943 at the Tokyo shipyard of Ishikawajima Shipbuilding & Engineering Co. Ltd., for the benefit of Nippon Yusen Kabushiki Kaisha, Tokyo. She was one of 18 Wartime Standard Type B Cargo Ships laid down in 1943–1944 and one of seven built by Tokyo Ishikawajima. Type B cargo ships built by Tokyo Ishikawajima were Bizen Maru (備前丸) Kokuyo Maru (國陽丸), Bicchu Maru (備中丸), Mino Maru (美濃丸), Miho Maru (美保丸), Mimasaka Maru (美作丸), and Miyama Maru (美山丸). She was launched in 1943 and completed on 20 December 1943. On 30 April 1945, she was torpedoed and sunk by the American submarine USS Trepang 70 miles (110 km) west of Heuksan (34°28′N 123°48′E).
