= Japanese cargo ship Kokuyo Maru (1943) =

History

Empire of Japan
- Name: Kokuyo Maru
- Builder: Ishikawajima Shipbuilding & Engineering Co. Ltd. Tokyo
- Launched: July 1943
- Sponsored by: Toyo Kisen Kaisha Co., Ltd, Tokyo
- Completed: 1943
- Identification: 50360
- Fate: Sunk, 12 March 1944
- Notes: Call sign: JNSS

General characteristics
- Type: Cargo ship
- Tonnage: 4,667 GRT standard
- Length: 112.00 m (367 ft 5 in) o/a
- Beam: 15.80 m (51 ft 10 in)
- Draught: 9.10 m (29 ft 10 in)
- Installed power: 2,900 hp (2,163 kW)
- Speed: 14.72 knots (27.26 km/h; 16.94 mph)

Kokuyo Maru (Japanese: 國陽丸) was a Japanese cargo ship of during World War II.

== History ==
She was launched in July 1943 at the Tokyo shipyard of Ishikawajima Shipbuilding & Engineering Co. Ltd., for the benefit of Nippon Yusen Kabushiki Kaisha, Tokyo. She was one of 18 Wartime Standard Type B Cargo Ships laid down in 1943–1944 and one of seven built by Tokyo Ishikawajima. Type B cargo ships built by Tokyo Ishikawajima were Bizen Maru (備前丸), Kokuyo Maru (國陽丸), Bicchu Maru (備中丸), Mino Maru (美濃丸), Miho Maru (美保丸), Mimasaka Maru (美作丸), and Miyama Maru (美山丸). She was launched in July 1943 and completed later in 1943. On 12 March 1944, she was torpedoed and sunk by the American submarine USS Sand Lance off the coast of the Izu Peninsula (32°52′N 139°12′E).
