= Japanese cargo ship Bizen Maru (1943) =

History

Empire of Japan
- Name: Bizen Maru
- Builder: Ishikawajima Shipbuilding & Engineering Co. Ltd. Tokyo
- Laid down: 1943
- Launched: 1943
- Sponsored by: Nippon Yusen Kabushiki Kaisha, Tokyo
- Completed: 15 June 1943
- Identification: 50262
- Fate: Sunk, 24 May 1944
- Notes: Call sign: JNIS

General characteristics
- Type: Cargo ship
- Tonnage: 4,603 GRT standard
- Length: 112.00 m (367 ft 5 in) o/a
- Beam: 15.80 m (51 ft 10 in)
- Draught: 9.10 m (29 ft 10 in)
- Installed power: 2,586 hp (1,928 kW)
- Speed: 11.5 knots (21.3 km/h; 13.2 mph)

Bizen Maru (Japanese: 備前丸) was a Japanese cargo ship during World War II.

== History ==
She was laid down in 1943 at the Tokyo shipyard of Ishikawajima Shipbuilding & Engineering Co. Ltd., for the benefit of Nippon Yusen Kabushiki Kaisha, Tokyo. She was one of 18 Wartime Standard Type B Cargo Ships laid down in 1943–1944 and one of seven built by Tokyo Ishikawajima. Type B cargo ships built by Tokyo Ishikawajima were Bizen Maru (備前丸) Kokuyo Maru (國陽丸), Bicchu Maru (備中丸), Mino Maru (美濃丸), Miho Maru (美保丸), Mimasaka Maru (美作丸), and Miyama Maru (美山丸). She was launched in 1943 and completed on 15 June 1943. On 24 May 1944, she was torpedoed and sunk by the American submarine USS Lapon, 250 miles (400 km) southeast of Saigon in the South China Sea (07°30′N 109°08′E).
