= USS Trepang (SS-412) =

Balao-class submarine in the United States Navy

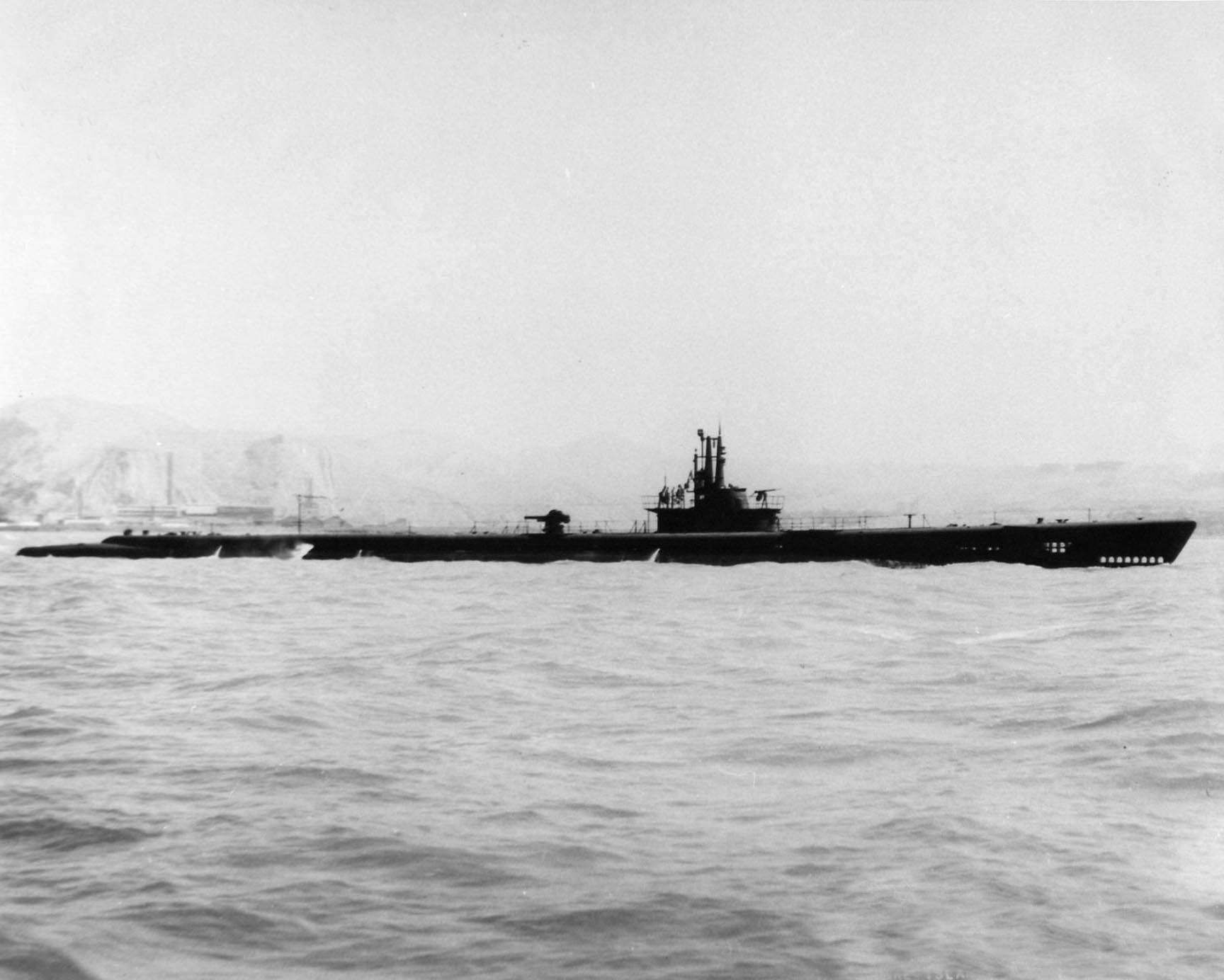
- USS Trepang (SS-412) underway off the Mare Island Navy Yard, California, on 12 July 1944.

History

United States
- Builder: Mare Island Navy Yard Vallejo, California
- Laid down: 25 June 1943
- Launched: 23 March 1944
- Commissioned: 22 May 1944
- Decommissioned: 27 June 1946
- Stricken: 30 June 1967
- Fate: Sunk as a target off southern California, 16 September 1969

General characteristics
- Class & type: Balao-class diesel-electric submarine
- Displacement: 1,526 long tons (1,550 t) surfaced; 2,424 long tons (2,463 t) submerged
- Length: 311 ft 10 in (95.05 m)
- Beam: 27 ft 4 in (8.33 m)
- Draft: 16 ft 10 in (5.13 m) maximum
- Propulsion: 4 × Fairbanks-Morse Model 38D8-⅛ 10-cylinder opposed piston diesel engines driving electrical generators; 2 × 126-cell Sargo batteries; 4 × high-speed General Electric electric motors with reduction gears; two propellers; 5,400 shp (4.0 MW) surfaced; 2,740 shp (2.0 MW) submerged
- Speed: 20.25 knots (38 km/h) surfaced; 8.75 knots (16 km/h) submerged
- Range: 11,000 nautical miles (20,000 km) surfaced at 10 knots (19 km/h)
- Endurance: 48 hours at 2 knots (3.7 km/h) submerged; 75 days on patrol
- Test depth: 400 ft (120 m)
- Complement: 10 officers, 70–71 enlisted
- Armament: 10 × 21-inch (533 mm) torpedo tubes; 6 forward, 4 aft; 24 torpedoes; 1 × 5-inch (127 mm) / 25 caliber deck gun; Bofors 40 mm and Oerlikon 20 mm cannon

The first USS Trepang (SS/AGSS-412) was a Balao-class submarine in the United States Navy. She was named after the trepang (or trīpang), an Indonesian name for a marine animal called a "sea slug" or a "sea cucumber," having a long, tough, muscular body and found in the coral reefs of the East Indies.

== Construction and commissioning ==
When the contract to build Trepang was awarded to Mare Island Navy Yard in Vallejo, California, SS-412 was to be named Senorita, which would have made her the only U.S. Navy ship to be named for the señorita, a brilliantly colored fish found along the California coast. She was renamed Trepang on 24 September 1942, and her keel was laid down on 25 June 1943. She was launched on 23 March 1944 sponsored by Mrs. Jane Andre Davenport (née Gorham), the wife of Trepang′s prospective commanding officer, Commander Roy Milton Davenport, and commissioned on 22 May 1944 with Commander Davenport — already a three-time Navy Cross winner — in command.

== Service history ==
=== World War II ===
==== May–September 1944 ====
Following shakedown at San Diego, California, Trepang departed San Diego on 15 August 1944 and proceeded to Pearl Harbor, Hawaii. where her crew trained and prepared the ship for combat.

==== First war patrol: September – October 1944 ====
Setting out from Pearl Harbor on 13 September 1944 for her first war patrol, Trepang prowled the waters south of Honshū, the largest and most important of Japan's home islands. She remained below during daylight hours and came up after dark to get a better view as she recharged her batteries and filled up with fresh air. On the night of 30 September, Trepang spotted a fast convoy departing Tokyo Bay. The submarine gave chase and closed in on a group of ships which included two large tankers, a small freighter, and an escort. The submarine fired an overlapping spread of torpedoes which struck the freighter, 750-ton Takunan Maru, and sent her to the bottom.

On 10 October, Trepang attacked her second convoy, which consisted of a pair of tankers and a single escort. Although the submarine claimed a "kill", a postwar assessment of the action did not credit her with a sinking. The following day, the error was reversed. The submarine launched four torpedoes at another Japanese ship, and her commanding officer recorded that all of the "fish" had missed. This time, however, postwar accounting credited Trepang with the destruction of the 1,000-ton Transport Number 105.

On 12 October, the submarine cruised some 12 miles (19 km) southwest of the entrance to Tokyo Bay. Soon after she came to the surface, and her radar swept the surrounding seas, four pips showed themselves on the phosphorescent screen—two large and two small—which were identified as two battleships and two destroyers.

Despite the fact that the phosphorescent waters would make his submarine stand out starkly in the night, Davenport closed at flank speed and fired a full spread of six torpedoes. The "fish" sped through the water toward their targets. He claimed success when explosions rumbled across the water, and flames lit up the night. Davenport turned the submarine to present her stern tubes to the enemy and loosed four more torpedoes. These all missed.

Davenport's gallant and skillfully pressed attacks earned him his fourth Navy Cross. He felt that he had damaged a Fusō-class battleship and had sunk a destroyer, but a study of Japanese records after the war did not verify either claim. [In fact the Trepang had damaged the Japanese destroyer Fuyutsuki off Omaesuki]

Her supply of torpedoes exhausted, Trepang cleared the area and headed for the Marshall Islands. She reached Majuro on 23 October for voyage repairs alongside submarine tender USS Bushnell (AS-15) and brief training.

==== Second war patrol: November – December 1944 ====
On 16 November, Trepang got underway for the Philippine Islands leading a "wolfpack" which also included sister ships USS Segundo (SS-398) and USS Razorback (SS-394). The wolfpack's nickname was "ROY'S RANGERS" as Trepang's own commanding officer, Roy M Davenport, was the officer in charge of the pack.

The weather was dark, windy, and rough on 6 December as Trepang's conning tower broke the surface after a day's submerged inshore patrol off Luzon. While shifting course toward deeper water, she detected a group of ships approaching from the northward. Upon closing to investigate, Trepang counted seven large ships and three escorts in the convoy which slowly approached the Philippines.

Trepang radioed news of her "find" to her packmaster and then submerged. The submarine shot straight and true, sending freighter Banshu Maru Number 31 and cargo ship Jinyo Maru to the bottom in quick succession and damaging a third vessel, Fukuyo Maru. However, as Trepang came about to administer the coup de grace to Fukuyo Maru, the third cargo ship obligingly blew up and sank. Meanwhile, as Segundo and Razorback arrived on the scene, Trepang fired all of her remaining torpedoes at a fourth ship which, she reported, blew up and sank soon thereafter. However, this fourth sinking was not confirmed by Japanese records. In the meantime, the other two American submarines were trying to finish off the fleeing remnants of the shattered convoy and managed to sink two ships, one with the aid of American naval aircraft. Trepang, now out of torpedoes, sped back to Pearl Harbor, arriving before Christmas.

Following this war patrol, Davenport, one of the most highly decorated submariners of the war, left Trepang for shore duty as an instructor at the United States Naval Academy.

==== Third war patrol: January – March 1945 ====
Again sailing for Honshū, Trepang—now under Cmdr. Allen R. Faust—teamed up with submarines USS Piper (SS-409), USS Pomfret (SS-391), USS Bowfin (SS-287), and USS Sterlet (SS-392), known as "Mac's Mops," on an anti-picket boat sweep past Nanpō Islands, the eastern island chain south of Tokyo, to clear the sea lanes for the aircraft carriers of Task Force 58 which in turn was about to strike the Japanese home islands to neutralize them during the assault on the strategic island of Iwo Jima. Trepang encountered no worthwhile targets during the patrol and had to settle for performing lifeguard duty for aircraft carrier assaults on Tokyo. On 24 February 1945, the submarine sank the 875-ton freighter Usuki Maru and blew the bow off another small coastal vessel. While maneuvering to finish off the crippled ship, several antisubmarine vessels appeared on the scene from behind a nearby headland and converged on the fleet boat. Trepang dove deep as the Japanese subjected her to a seven-hour depth charge barrage. On 14 March, Trepang sank the IJN Guardboat Kaiko Maru off Inubosaki. On 17 March, Trepang attacked and sank 117-ton picket boat Tsukiura Maru (a converted bonito and tunny fishing boat) off Torishima.

==== Fourth war patrol: April – May 1945 ====
Following her return to Guam in March, Trepang headed for the Yellow Sea, a "hazardous duty" area due to its vast stretches of shallow water. Despite the danger, the submarine performed well, sinking the 1000-ton landing craft Transport Number 146 on 28 April; the 4667-ton, heavily laden freighter, Miho Maru two days later; and Minesweeper Number 20 which blew sky-high with a hit on her magazine on 4 May. In addition, the submarine surfaced to shell a junk with a load of lumber. The sole member of this victim's crew, a Korean, understood little sign language, and looked to be of little value for intelligence purposes, so he was put back on board his barely seaworthy craft, with tools and food, and sent on his way. Leaving the Yellow Sea, Trepang did a short tour of lifeguarding for B-25 Mitchell strikes on Shanghai, China, and for the continuing series of B-29 Superfortress raids on Tokyo, before she returned to Guam.

==== Fifth war patrol: June – July 1945 ====
Trepang's fifth war patrol was divided into two parts—the first saw the ship operating in a lifeguard capacity while the second gave her a more offensive role off northeastern Honshū and eastern Hokkaidō. In the former role, she arrived on station to the southeast of Tokyo Bay. On 22 June 1945, she was on the surface in the Pacific Ocean 20 nautical miles (37 km; 23 mi) southeast of Daiozaki Light on the coast of Honshu, Japan, when a flight of seven United States Army Air Forces B-29 Superfortress bombers jettisoned three bombs which straddled her, one landing 1,000 yards (910 m) off her port bow and two landing 2,000 yards (1,800 m) off her starboard quarter. She suffered no damage or casualties.

Having experienced two previous tours of lifeguarding, Trepang's men otherwise expected a series of long dull days, spent moving in circles, squares, or triangles to break the monotony. However, shortly before 12:00 on 24 June 1945, her first day of lifeguard duty, lookouts spotted a blossoming parachute overhead and soon saw the splash of a crashed P-51 Mustang fighter damaged while escorting Superfortresses to Tokyo. Trepang bent on full power and soon picked up the downed aviator, Second Lieutenant Lamar Christian, USAAF, safe and sound. During the maneuver, another Mustang, piloted by First Lieutenant Frank Ayres, USAAF, radioed that it, too, was in trouble; and the pilot requested permission to bail out. Trepang replied telling Ayres to "be patient" until the first rescue was complete. Ayres circled the submarine until Christian was safely on board the submarine. Ayres then executed a perfect jump and landed some 400 yards (370 m) away from Trepang and was soon hauled on board.

On 27 June 1945, Trepang turned the two airmen over to the submarine USS Tigrone (SS-419) which was on her way home with 30 other aviators already on board. In the middle of the transfer, the submarines picked up a radio message from a "Boxkite" (rescue search plane) that the surviving crew of Superfortress 44-70109 of the 504th Bomb Group, downed on 26 June 1945, was floating a mere 7 nautical miles (13 km; 8.1 mi) from the Japanese seaport of Nagoya. Accompanied by her sister ship USS Springer (SS-414) which had also been discharging passengers to Tigrone, Trepang surged ahead.

The two submarines raced to save the Superfortress's crew. Trepang put on full speed and arrived on the scene first. She found eight survivors in four groups of rafts, spread over about 4 nautical miles (7.4 km; 4.6 mi) of ocean. By the time Springer arrived on the scene, Trepang had picked up seven of the fliers. Springer picked up the last man. Four other members of the Superfortress crew did not survive, either having been either trapped in the plane, killed when their burning parachutes failed, or gone missing.

On 30 June 1945 En route to a rendezvous with submarine USS Devilfish (SS-292), Trepang sighted a small, troop-laden freighter — described in an official ship's history both as a 492-displacement ton minesweeper and a 600-gross register ton cargo ship, in either case armed with two 37-millimeter guns — and sank the ship with her deck guns. A dozen or so Japanese soldiers from the flaming vessel refused to be picked up and taken prisoner and so were left to drown.

Subsequently, patrolling off the eastern coast of Honshū, Trepang went scoreless until 7 July 1945 when she spotted a coastal convoy of three ships. She torpedoed and sank the lead ship—Koun Maru Number Two—but the other vessels conducted evasive action and sped away from the scene at full speed. Heading to seaward, Trepang suddenly shuddered under the impact of two depth-charge explosions. A solitary Japanese plane had spotted Trepang's shadow in the shallow waters and had attacked her with depth charges. All missed their mark.

Given another lifeguarding assignment, Trepang stood on the alert to pick up possible downed airmen from British and American aircraft carrier strikes on the Japanese Home Islands. During this tour in July 1945, she rescued one pilot, Lieutenant, junior grade, Bill Kingston, USNR. In addition, on 14 July 1945, she witnessed a shore bombardment conducted by three battleships and a heavy cruiser against Kamaishi, Japan, during which, reportedly, Trepang sank a 100-gross register ton Lugger with her deck gun.

By now, the war was moving fast, and Trepang returned to Pearl Harbor for a refit. There, she watched the succession of headlines—first the atomic bombs on Hiroshima and Nagasaki, the Soviet Union's entry into the Far Eastern War, Japan's acceptance of surrender terms, and finally, on 15 August, peace at last.

=== Post-World War II ===
After completion of her refit, Trepang departed Pearl Harbor and arrived at San Diego on 3 September 1945. Decommissioned on 27 June 1946 and placed in reserve at Vallejo, California, at the Mare Island Naval Shipyard, Trepang remained in reserve until 1967. She was redesignated as an auxiliary submarine and given the hull classification symbol AGSS-412 on 11 June 1962.

== Disposal ==
Struck from the Naval Vessel Register on 30 June 1967 Trepang was authorized for disposal on 22 December 1967. She was sunk as a target in the Pacific Ocean off Southern California during Exercise "Strike Ex 4-69" on 16 September 1969 by the combined gunfire of the destroyers USS Henderson (DD-785) and USS Fechteler (DD-870).

== Honors and awards ==
Trepang received five battle stars for World War II service and a Navy Unit Commendation.

== In media ==
While in reserve, Trepang appeared in "Dennis at Boot Camp," the ninth episode of the fourth season of the American situation comedy Dennis the Menace, first broadcast in the United States on 25 November 1962.
