= Japanese cargo ship Bicchu Maru (1943) =

History

Empire of Japan
- Name: Bicchu Maru
- Builder: Ishikawajima Shipbuilding & Engineering Co. Ltd. Tokyo
- Launched: 1943
- Sponsored by: Nippon Yusen Kabushiki Kaisha, Tokyo
- Identification: 50361
- Fate: Sunk, 30 March 1944
- Notes: Call sign: JNVS

General characteristics
- Type: Cargo ship
- Tonnage: 4,667 GRT standard
- Length: 112.00 m (367 ft 5 in) o/a
- Beam: 15.80 m (51 ft 10 in)
- Draught: 9.10 m (29 ft 10 in)
- Speed: 15.23 knots (28.21 km/h; 17.53 mph)

Bicchu Maru (Japanese: 備中丸) was a Japanese cargo ship during World War II.

== History ==
She was laid down in 1943 at the Tokyo shipyard of Ishikawajima Shipbuilding & Engineering Co. Ltd., for the benefit of Nippon Yusen Kabushiki Kaisha, Tokyo. She was one of 18 Wartime Standard Type B cargo ships laid down in 1943–1944 and one of seven built by Tokyo Ishikawajima. Type B cargo ships built by Tokyo Ishikawajima were Bizen Maru (備前丸) Kokuyo Maru (國陽丸), Bicchu Maru (備中丸), Mino Maru (美濃丸), Miho Maru (美保丸), Mimasaka Maru (美作丸), and Miyama Maru (美山丸). She was launched in 1943. On 30 March 1944, she was bombed and sunk in an airstrike in Palau harbor conducted by aircraft carrier-based planes as part of Operation Desecrate One.
