= Japanese cargo ship Mino Maru (1943) =

History

Empire of Japan
- Name: Mino Maru
- Builder: Ishikawajima Shipbuilding & Engineering Co. Ltd. Tokyo
- Laid down: 1943
- Launched: 24 February 1944
- Sponsored by: Nippon Yusen Kabushiki Kaisha, Tokyo
- Completed: 6 March 1944
- Identification: 51273
- Fate: sunk
- Notes: Call sign: JNWT

General characteristics
- Type: Cargo ship
- Tonnage: 4,667 GRT standard
- Length: 112.00 m (367 ft 5 in) o/a
- Beam: 15.80 m (51 ft 10 in)
- Draught: 9.10 m (29 ft 10 in)
- Installed power: 2,000 shp (1,500 kW)
- Speed: 11.5 knots (21.3 km/h; 13.2 mph)

Mino Maru (Japanese: 美濃丸) was a Japanese cargo ship of during World War II.

== History ==
She was laid down in 1943 at the Tokyo shipyard of Ishikawajima Shipbuilding & Engineering Co. Ltd., for the benefit of Nippon Yusen Kabushiki Kaisha, Tokyo. She was one of 18 Wartime Standard Type B Cargo Ships laid down in 1943–1944 and one of seven built by Tokyo Ishikawajima. Type B cargo ships built by Tokyo Ishikawajima were Bizen Maru (備前丸) Kokuyo Maru (國陽丸), Bicchu Maru (備中丸), Mino Maru (美濃丸), Miho Maru (美保丸), Mimasaka Maru (美作丸), and Miyama Maru (美山丸). She was launched 24 February 1944 and completed on 6 March 1944. On 11 December 1944, she was bombed and sunk in an airstrike off the coast of Palompon (11°05′N 124°20′E).
