= USS Segundo =

Balao-class submarine

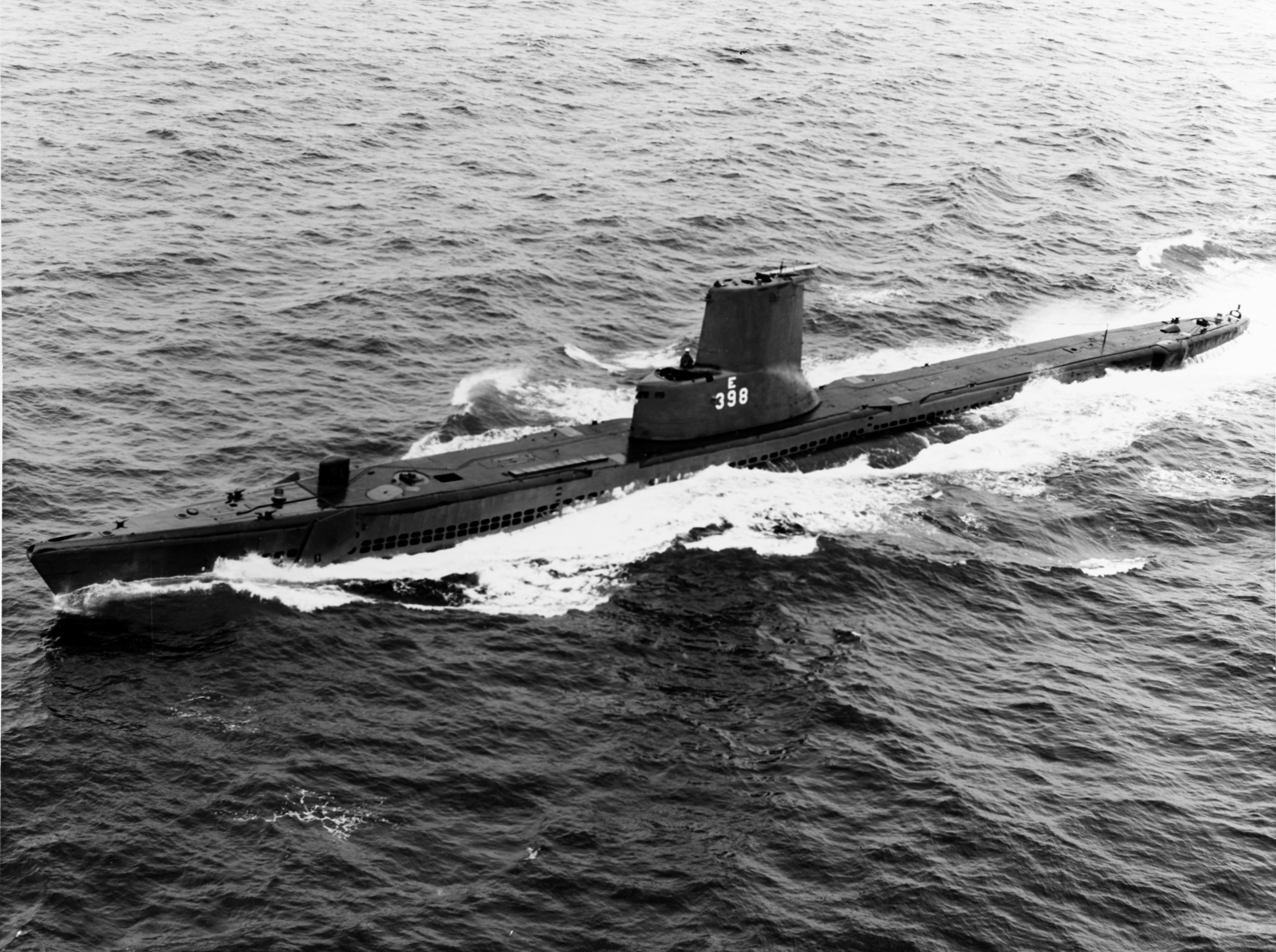
- USS Segundo (SS-398) underway at sea on 1 March 1966.

History

United States
- Name: Segundo
- Builder: Portsmouth Naval Shipyard, Kittery, Maine
- Laid down: 14 October 1943
- Launched: 5 February 1944
- Commissioned: 9 May 1944
- Decommissioned: 1 August 1970
- Stricken: 8 August 1970
- Fate: Sunk as a target, 8 August 1970

General characteristics
- Class & type: Balao-class diesel-electric submarine
- Displacement: 1,526 tons (1,550 t) surfaced; 2,391 tons (2,429 t) submerged
- Length: 311 ft 6 in (94.95 m)
- Beam: 27 ft 3 in (8.31 m)
- Draft: 16 ft 10 in (5.13 m) maximum
- Propulsion: 4 × Fairbanks-Morse Model 38D8-⅛ 10-cylinder opposed piston diesel engines driving electrical generators; 2 × 126-cell Sargo batteries; 4 × high-speed Elliott electric motors with reduction gears; two propellers; 5,400 shp (4.0 MW) surfaced; 2,740 shp (2.0 MW) submerged
- Speed: 20.25 knots (38 km/h) surfaced; 8.75 knots (16 km/h) submerged
- Range: 11,000 nautical miles (20,000 km) surfaced at 10 knots (19 km/h)
- Endurance: 48 hours at 2 knots (3.7 km/h) submerged; 75 days on patrol
- Test depth: 400 ft (120 m)
- Complement: 10 officers, 70–71 enlisted
- Armament: 10 × 21-inch (533 mm) torpedo tubes; 6 forward, 4 aft; 24 torpedoes; 1 × 5-inch (127 mm) / 25 caliber deck gun; Bofors 40 mm and Oerlikon 20 mm cannon

USS Segundo (SS-398) was a Balao-class submarine, of the United States Navy named for the segundo, a cavalla fish of Caribbean waters.

== Construction and commissioning ==
Segundo was laid down on 14 October 1943 by the Portsmouth Navy Yard in [Kittery, Maine, launched on 5 February 1944, sponsored by Mrs. John L. Sullivan, and commissioned on 9 May 1944.

== May–August 1944 ==
Segundo completed fitting out and contract trials then moved to New London, Connecticut, on 15 June and began training. The submarine stood out of New London on 26 June for the Panama Canal Zone en route to the Pacific war zone. She departed Balboa on 9 July and arrived at Pearl Harbor on 25 July. The next several weeks were spent in training exercises and weapons firing. The ship was combat loaded on 19 August and 20 August and, the next day, sailed on her first war patrol.

== First and second patrols, August 1944 – January 1945 ==
Segundo, together with submarines Seahorse, and Whale formed a wolf pack. They refueled at Saipan on 3 September and departed the next day for their patrol area in the Philippines near Surigao Strait. She was in the Philippine Sea 165 nautical miles (306 km; 190 mi) east of Catanduanes Island at 13°32′N 126°55′E on 13 September 1944 when two U.S. Navy planes mistook her for a Japanese submarine and strafed her as she crash-dived. No rounds struck her. Segundo found no worthwhile targets were found during the patrol, and she ended it at Majuro Atoll in the Marshall Islands on 21 October 1944 without having fired a shot.

The second patrol, from 16 November 1944 to 5 January 1945, was more profitable. Segundo, and sister boats Trepang, and Razorback were cruising between Luzon Strait and the South China Sea. On the evening of 6 December, a convoy of seven escorted merchant ships was sighted. The three submarines made night attacks which sank all of the merchantmen.

== Third patrol, February–March 1945 ==
Segundo refitted at Guam from the submarine tender Apollo and was in the East China Sea with Razorback and Sea Cat on 1 February. Three torpedo attacks were made on unescorted ships near the Korean coast in shallow water. The first attack was on 6 March against a small ship but all torpedoes missed. The next was made four days later against a medium-sized ship. Four torpedoes were fired at 1,000 yards (900 m) but they also missed.

The third attack was a night surface action against a cargo ship on 11 March. Two torpedoes of the spread hit. The first blew the stern off and the second hit amidships, sinking cargo ship Shori Maru in two minutes. The submarine ended her patrol at Pearl Harbor on 26 March and remained there for a month before putting to sea again.

== Fourth and fifth patrols, May–August 1945 ==
Segundo was assigned to a lifeguard station until 16 May when she departed for her assigned area in the East China Sea. On 29 May, she sank seven two-masted schooners of approximately 100 tons each with shellfire. Two days later, she sank a large four-masted full-rigged ship of approximately 1,250 tons with two torpedoes. She sank another on 3 June with her deck gun. On 9 June, two patrol ships were also sunk by her deck gun. On the night of 11 June, Fukui Maru was torpedoed and sunk. The submarine then sailed to Midway Atoll for upkeep.

Segundo began her fifth and final war patrol on 10 August in the Sea of Okhotsk. Ordered to proceed to Tokyo Bay on 24 August, the ship was proceeding south when she encountered the I-400-class submarine I-401, which was at the time the largest submarine in the world, by radar on 29 August. The enemy boat was ordered to halt by international signal. This was done; and, after several trips between the two submarines by their respective representatives, the Japanese agreed to accept a prize crew aboard and to proceed to Tokyo with Segundo. The two ships entered Sagami Wan on 31 August and, at 05:00, the American flag was raised aboard I-401.

== 1945–1953 ==
Segundo stood out of Tokyo Bay on 3 September 1945 en route to the west coast via Pearl Harbor. She was assigned to SubRon 3 in San Diego and began operations from there. The submarine made a three-month cruise to Australia and China in 1946 and a four-month cruise to China in 1948. The outbreak of the Korean War found Segundo in the Far East. She supported United Nations Forces in Korea from July to September 1950 before returning to San Diego in late November.

In 1951, Segundo was modernized and converted to a Fleet Snorkel submarine at the San Francisco Naval Shipyard. She returned to her home port and resumed operations until 15 August 1952 when she again joined the 7th Fleet off Korea. That deployment period ended on 16 February 1953.

== 1953–1970 ==
For the next 16 years, Segundo operated out of her home port and along the west coast. From 1953 through 1969, she was deployed to the western Pacific every year except 1961, and 1963.

Segundo departed for the Western Pacific Ocean on 27 November 1956 with stops in Pearl Harbor, Yokosuka, Japan, Hong Kong, China, Subic Bay and Manila, Philippines and Buckner Bay, Okinawa. The reason for this emergency departure was because of the Hungarian revolt that was taking place at the time. The Segundo was ordered into port in San Diego and shortly after departed for Peal Harbor, then the north Pacific on a special patrol, submerging on 21 December 1956 and resurfacing on 21 January 1957 before stopping in Yokosuka Japan.

In July 1970, a Survey Board found Segundo unfit for further naval service. The submarine was decommissioned 1 August 1970, struck from the Navy list on 8 August 1970, and sunk as a target by either the submarine Salmon or the submarine Sailfish (sources differ).

== Honors and awards ==
Segundo received four battle stars for World War II service and one for the Korean War.
