= USS Lapon (SS-260) =

Submarine of the United States

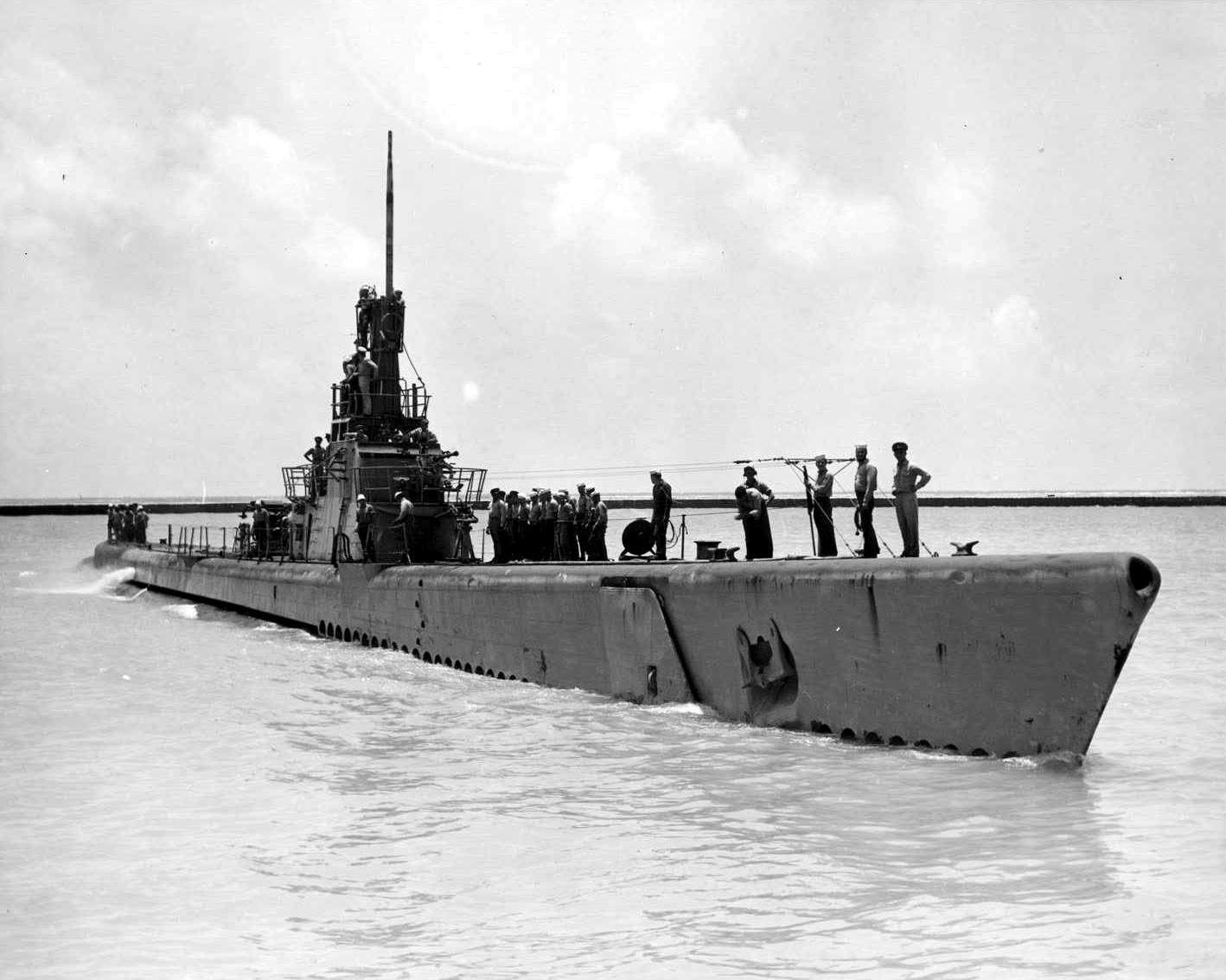
- Lapon (SS-260) arriving home after another patrol, c. 1945.

History

United States
- Name: USS Lapon
- Builder: Electric Boat Company, Groton, Connecticut
- Laid down: 21 February 1942
- Launched: 27 October 1942
- Sponsored by: Mrs. Jesse B. Oldendorf
- Commissioned: 23 January 1943
- Decommissioned: 25 July 1946
- Recommissioned: 13 April 1957
- Decommissioned: 10 August 1957
- Stricken: 31 December 1975
- Identification: SS-260
- Fate: Transferred to Greece, 10 August 1957

Greece
- Name: Poseidon
- Acquired: 10 August 1957
- Stricken: April 1976
- Identification: S-78
- Fate: Purchased outright in April 1976 and cannibalized for spare parts

General characteristics
- Class & type: Gato-class diesel-electric submarine
- Displacement: 1,525 long tons (1,549 t) surfaced; 2,424 long tons (2,463 t) submerged
- Length: 311 ft 9 in (95.02 m)
- Beam: 27 ft 3 in (8.31 m)
- Draft: 17 ft 0 in (5.18 m) maximum
- Propulsion: 4 × Hooven-Owens-Rentschler (H.O.R.) diesel engines driving electrical generators; 2 × 126-cell Sargo batteries; 4 × high-speed Allis-Chalmers electric motors with reduction gears; two propellers; 5,400 shp (4.0 MW) surfaced; 2,740 shp (2.0 MW) submerged
- Speed: 21 kn (39 km/h) surfaced; 9 kn (17 km/h) submerged
- Range: 11,000 nmi (20,000 km) surfaced at 10 knots (19 km/h)
- Endurance: 48 hours at 2 knots (4 km/h) submerged; 75 days on patrol
- Test depth: 300 ft (90 m)
- Complement: 6 officers, 54 enlisted
- Armament: 10 × 21-inch (533 mm) torpedo tubes; 6 forward, 4 aft; 24 torpedoes; 1 × 3-inch (76 mm) / 50 caliber deck gun; Bofors 40 mm and Oerlikon 20 mm cannon

USS Lapon (SS-260), a Gato-class submarine, was the first ship of the United States Navy to be named after the lapon, a scorpionfish of the Pacific coast of the United States.

== Construction and career ==
Her keel was laid down by the Electric Boat Company, Groton, Connecticut 21 February 1942. She was launched on 27 October 1942, sponsored by Mrs. J. B. Oldendorf, wife of Rear Admiral Jesse B. Oldendorf. Lapon was commissioned on 23 January 1943.

=== First and second war patrols, June – November 1943 ===
Completing trials and training in Long Island Sound, Lapon departed New London for the Pacific 4 May 1943. She reportedly was mistakenly machine-gunned by friendly forces at New London Sanctuary on 5 June, but continued her voyage and arrived at Pearl Harbor, Hawaii, on 1 June 1943. She departed 24 June for her first war patrol which was spent in the Sea of Okhotsk and Sea of Japan. On 3 July, Lapon, along with Permit (SS-178) and Plunger became the first U.S. submarines to slip through a mined strait into the Sea of Japan.

The entire time Lapon operated in the Sea of Japan, she was surrounded by thick fog and had problems with her radar. After she exited the Sea of Japan through La Perouse Strait, she patrolled off the east coast of Hokkaidō and Honshū. There she saw an aircraft carrier and a pair of destroyers. The escorts kept Lapon pinned down with the assistance of aircraft, and the carrier escaped.

The submarine departed 26 September for a close inshore patrol off the south coast of Honshū. After sinking cargo ship Taichu Maru 18 October, Lapon returned to Pearl Harbor 4 November 1943 and departed for the West Coast 7 November for an overhaul at Mare Island Navy Yard.

=== Third, fourth, and fifth war patrols, January – August 1944 ===
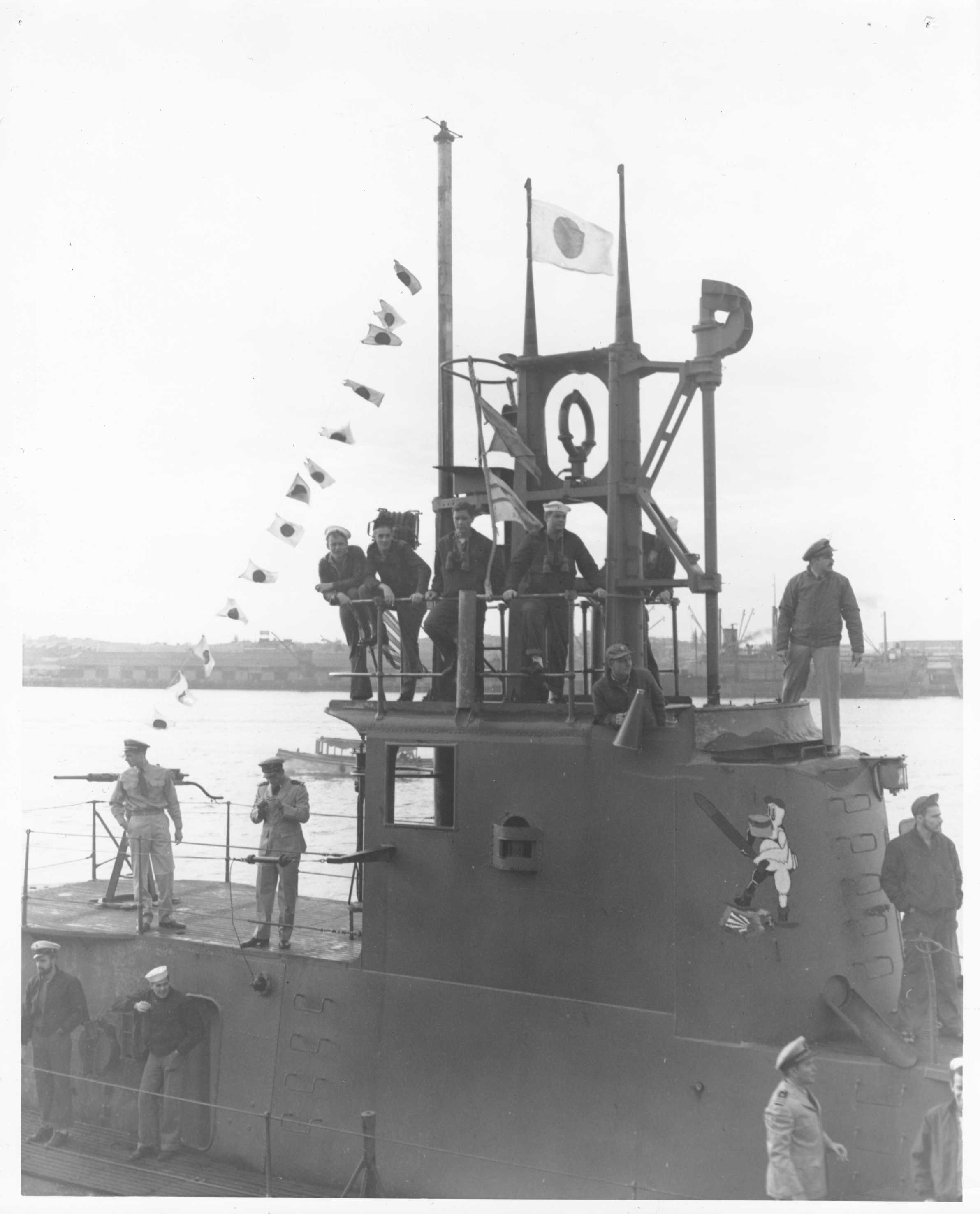
USS Lapon returning to port, possibly Fremantle

Refitted with four new engines, the submarine departed for the South China Sea via Pearl Harbor in February 1944. Lapon sought out torpedo targets and inflicted heavy damage on the enemy. She sank the cargo ship Toyokuni Maru on 8 March, Nichirei Maru on 9 March, and Hokuroku Maru (8359 tons) on 18 March, and inflicted heavy damage to several small craft. Lapon terminated this patrol in Fremantle, Australia, arriving 1 April 1944.

Departing 25 April, Lapon arrived in the South China Sea and on 23 May detected and tracked a convoy. During the early hours of 24 May, the submarine sank the cargo ships Wales Maru and Bizen Maru. Lapon cleared the area at flank speed chased by an escort and returned to Fremantle 6 June for refit.

USS Lapon stateroom, c. 1943

Underway for the eastern part of the South China Sea 29 June, Lapon spotted a cruiser and destroyer, the latter escaping at high speed. Four days later she sent cargo ship Kyodo Maru No. 36 to the bottom. In the early evening of 31 July 1944, a convoy was sighted in Palawan Passage. Lapon closed in for a night submerged radar attack and sunk the tanker Tinshin Maru and damaged two other vessels. Lapon then headed for Australia and moored at Fremantle 10 August.

=== Sixth and seventh war patrols, September 1944 – January 1945 ===
Lapon sailed for the South China Sea on 4 September, Lieutenant Commander (LCDR) Donald G. Baer in command. She rendezvoused with submarines Flasher and Bonefish and became a member of a wolfpack. Early in the morning of 21 September, the submarine contacted an enemy hospital ship and allowed the ship to pass unharmed. That afternoon, while rounding Palauic point, Lapon spotted smoke and commenced closing. As she neared attack position U.S. carrier-based planes attacked the convoy, inflicting heavy damage on the enemy. Lapon attacked remnants of the convoy 22 September and sank the cargo ship Shun Yuan. The next day Flasher and Lapon made a coordinated attack on several ships, Lapon sinking the tanker Hokki Maru. Patrolling off the coast of Luzon 10 October 1944, Lapon intercepted a Manila-bound convoy and sank the cargo ship Ejiri Maru. Assigned to lifeguard duty, the submarine was on station during the air attacks preliminary to the invasion of the Philippines; and 21 October departed for Australia, arriving at Fremantle 31 October.

Lapon left port for her seventh patrol 23 November and took position on a scouting line to prevent enemy reinforcements from reaching Mindoro and Leyte. Aircraft contacts were many and ship contacts few. Lapon was the last submarine to prowl Lingayen Gulf before the invasion of Luzon, and was ordered out of the area at high speed the day of the first landings. She headed for Pearl Harbor, arriving 21 January 1945. Departing for the West Coast 4 days later, she moored at Mare Island Navy Yard 31 January.

=== Eighth war patrol, April – July 1945 ===
Bound for her last patrol, Lapon arrived at Pearl Harbor 22 April, stayed there for a month, then headed for Guam, arriving 5 June. Next day she sailed on a special mission of lifeguarding for a British carrier strike force and for B-24 and B-29 bombers striking the Japanese homeland. Returning to Guam 20 June, she headed for Saipan 4 days later to join submarines for a picket boat sweep ahead of Admiral Halsey’s forces which were to attack Tokyo area targets. Upon completion of sweeps, Lapon went on lifeguard duty off Tori Shima until 7 July when she steamed for Midway Atoll, briefly stopping at Saipan for temporary repairs, mooring 23 July.

The day she was to sail for another war patrol, hostilities ended. Instead, Lapon departed for the Atlantic coast 26 August and arrived at New Orleans, Louisiana, 20 September 1945. She remained there until she departed 24 October for the Texas coast, arriving Galveston 25 October. Two days later she berthed at Houston. Lapon got underway for Staten Island, New York on 30 October, arriving 4 November. She remained at New York until 8 January 1946, when she sailed for New London, arriving the same day. Lapon was placed out of commission in reserve 25 July 1946.

=== Greek service ===
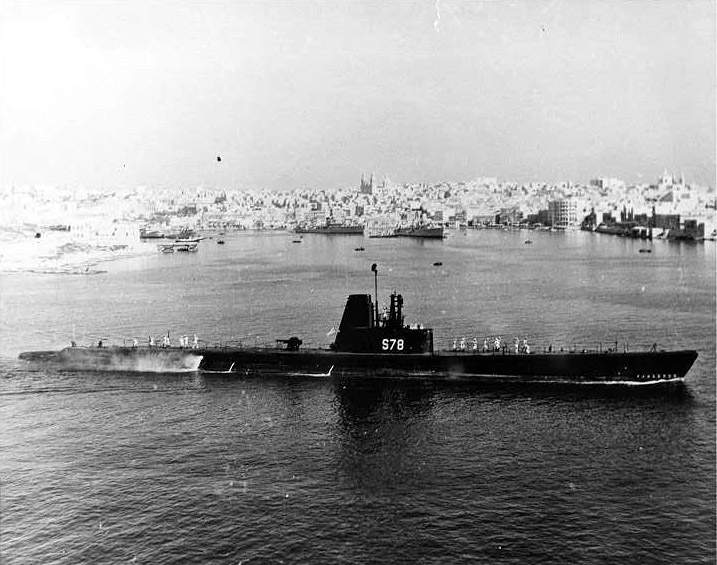
Poseidon (S-78), ex-Lapon, in 1961.

Recommissioned at Portsmouth Naval Shipyard, 13 April 1957, Lapon remained in the Portsmouth vicinity until 10 August, when she was decommissioned and struck from the Navy list. On 8 August 1957 she was transferred to Greece by Captain Samuel Francis under the Military Assistance Program and served the Greek Navy as Poseidon (S-78) (originally carrying pennant number Y-16).

Poseidon was purchased outright by Greece in April 1976 and stricken from active duty for use as spare parts for sister ships. SS-260 was stricken from the US Navy Register on 31 December 1975.

== Honors and awards ==
- Navy Unit Commendation
- Asiatic-Pacific Campaign Medal with four battle stars for World War II service

Lapon was credited with sinking 53,443 tons of Japanese shipping. She was awarded the Navy Unit Commendation for her brilliantly successful third, fourth, fifth, and sixth patrols.

== Bibliography ==
- Hinman, Charles R., and Douglas E. Campbell. The Submarine Has No Friends: Friendly Fire Incidents Involving U.S. Submarines During World War II. Syneca Research Group, Inc., 2019. ISBN 978-0-359-76906-3.
- Wright, C. C. (2005). "Question 17/03: Replacement of US Submarine Diesel Engines". Warship International. XLII (4): 431–434. ISSN 0043-0374.
