= USS Razorback =

Submarine of the United States

USS Razorback (SS-394)
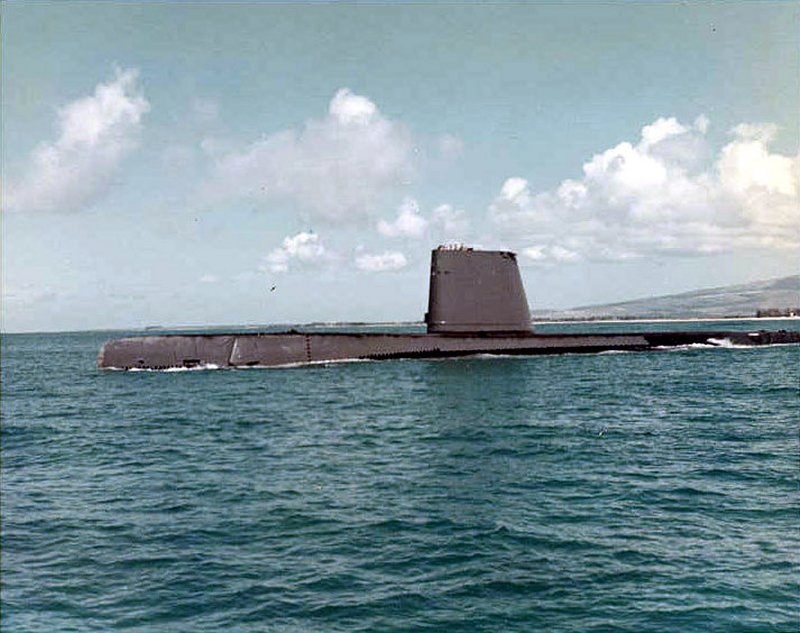
- Razorback off Hawaii ca. the 1960s after GUPPY IIA conversion.

History

United States
- Builder: Portsmouth Naval Shipyard, Kittery, Maine
- Laid down: 9 September 1943
- Launched: 27 January 1944
- Sponsored by: Mrs. H. F. D. Davis
- Commissioned: 3 April 1944
- Decommissioned: August 1952
- Recommissioned: 1954
- Decommissioned: 30 November 1970
- Stricken: 30 November 1970
- Fate: Sold to Turkey, 30 November 1970

Turkey
- Name: TCG Muratreis (S-336)
- Acquired: 30 November 1970
- Commissioned: 17 December 1971
- Decommissioned: 8 August 2001
- Fate: Sold 25 March 2004; Museum ship 15 May 2005

General characteristics
- Class & type: Balao-class diesel-electric submarine
- Displacement: 1,526 long tons (1,550 t) surfaced; 2,391 long tons (2,429 t) submerged
- Length: 311 ft 6 in (94.95 m)
- Beam: 27 ft 3 in (8.31 m)
- Draft: 16 ft 10 in (5.13 m) maximum
- Propulsion: 4 × Fairbanks-Morse Model 38D8-⅛ 10-cylinder opposed piston diesel engines driving electrical generators; 2 × 126-cell Sargo batteries; 4 × high-speed Elliott electric motors with reduction gears; two propellers; 5,400 shp (4.0 MW) surfaced; 2,740 shp (2.0 MW) submerged
- Speed: 20.25 knots (37.50 km/h; 23.30 mph) surfaced; 8.75 knots (16.21 km/h; 10.07 mph) submerged
- Range: 11,000 nmi (20,000 km; 13,000 mi) surfaced at 10 knots (19 km/h; 12 mph)
- Endurance: 48 hours at 2 knots (3.7 km/h; 2.3 mph) submerged; 75 days on patrol
- Test depth: 400 ft (120 m)
- Complement: 10 officers, 70–71 enlisted
- Armament: 10 × 21-inch (533 mm) torpedo tubes; 6 forward, 4 aft; 24 torpedoes; 1 × 4-inch (102 mm) / 50 caliber deck gun; Bofors 40 mm and Oerlikon 20 mm cannon

General characteristics (Guppy IIA)
- Class & type: none
- Displacement: 1,848 long tons (1,878 t) surfaced; 2,440 long tons (2,480 t) submerged
- Length: 307 ft (94 m)
- Beam: 27 ft 4 in (8.33 m)
- Draft: 17 ft (5.2 m)
- Propulsion: Snorkel added; One diesel engine and generator removed; Batteries upgraded to Sargo II
- Speed: Surfaced: 17.0 knots (31.5 km/h; 19.6 mph) maximum; 13.5 knots (25.0 km/h; 15.5 mph) cruising; Submerged: 14.1 knots (26.1 km/h; 16.2 mph) for 1/2 hour; 8.0 knots (14.8 km/h; 9.2 mph) snorkeling; 3.0 knots (5.6 km/h; 3.5 mph) cruising
- Armament: 10 × 21 inches (533 mm) torpedo tubes; (6 forward, 4 aft); all guns removed
- USS Razorback(SS-394)
- U.S. National Register of Historic Places
- Location within Arkansas
- Location: North bank of the Arkansas River at the Arkansas Inland Maritime Museum near I-30 Bridge, North Little Rock, Arkansas
- Coordinates: 34°45′7.60″N 92°16′1.12″W
- Area: less than 1 acre (0.40 ha)
- Built: 1943
- Architect: Portsmouth Naval Shipyard
- NRHP reference No.: 04001502
- Added to NRHP: 1 September 2005

USS Razorback (SS-394), a Balao-class submarine, was the only ship of the United States Navy to be named after the razorback. She is arguably the longest-serving combat front-line submarine still existing in the world, having been commissioned by two different countries for 56 years of active duty. She was in Tokyo Bay during the surrender of Japan. In 2004, the state of Arkansas adopted the submarine (although she was not named after the University of Arkansas Razorbacks mascot) and she is now a museum ship at the Arkansas Inland Maritime Museum.

== Construction and commissioning ==
Razorback's keel was laid down by the Portsmouth Navy Yard in Kittery, Maine on 9 September 1943. She was launched, sponsored by Hazel DuMont (Grant) Davis, wife of Captain H.F.D. Davis, manager of the Portland Navy Yard from June 1940 to June 1944, on 27 January 1944 Razorback was commissioned on 3 April 1944, Lt. Comdr. A. M. Bontier, commanding.

== Service history ==
=== U.S. Navy ===
==== World War II ====
During shakedown exercises off New London, Connecticut in late April 1944, Razorback ran aground on Race Point Ledge between Fisher Island's Race Point and Race Rock in Block Island Sound. A board of inquiry removed the captain and replaced him with Commander Roy S. Benson. The executive officer, Lt. Commander Haynes was also replaced, by Lt Commander C. Donald Brown.

After shakedown off New England, Razorback proceeded to Pearl Harbor, Hawaii. Her first war patrol, commencing 25 August, was conducted east of Luzon as a member of an offensive group in support of the mid-September Palau landings. After sighting only enemy antisubmarine planes, she headed northeastward, arriving at Midway Island on 19 October.

On 15 November Razorback sailed from Midway Island on her second war patrol in company with Trepang and Segundo. Operating with these submarines in the Luzon Straits, Razorback damaged 6933 ton freighter Kenjo Maru on 6 December and sank the old 820 ton destroyer Kuretake and damaged another freighter on 30 December. She arrived at Guam for refit on 5 January 1945.

On 1 February Razorback set out for the East China Sea for her third war patrol, this time accompanied by Segundo and Sea Cat. After sinking four wooden ships in three separate surface gun actions, she deposited three Japanese prisoners at Guam before terminating her patrol at Pearl Harbor on 26 March 1945.

On 7 May Razorback headed west again. Assigned to lifeguard duty in the Nanpō Islands and Tokyo Bay areas, she rescued Lieutenant Colonel Charles E. Taylor, a P-51 fighter pilot from the 21st Fighter Group on 25 May. On 5 June she rescued four B-29 Superfortress crewmen shot down during an air raid over Kobe, Japan. Razorback retired to Midway Island to end that patrol and refit on 27 June.

On 22 July Razorback departed Midway Island for patrol in the Okhotsk Sea, where she sank six wooden cargo sea trucks (i.e., small Imperial Japanese Navy ship types used for frontline logistics) and damaged two in a surface gun action. The remainder of the patrol was spent performing lifeguard services off Paramushiro for Alaska-based planes. On 31 August Razorback entered Tokyo Bay with 11 other submarines to take part in the formal Japanese surrender. She departed 3 September, arrived at Pearl Harbor, Hawaii on 11 September and San Diego, California on 20 September.

==== 1945–1954 ====
After the war she remained active with the Pacific Fleet serving off Japan and China in early 1948 and again in late 1949. She won the Navy "E" for overall excellence in 1949. In August 1952 she decommissioned incident to conversion to a GUPPY IIA-type submarine. She recommissioned in January 1954 and reported to Submarine Squadron 10 at New London, Connecticut, for shakedown and training.

==== 1954–1970 ====
Following shakedown Razorback was transferred to the United States West Coast and on 24 May 1954 became a unit of Submarine Squadron 3, based at Naval Station San Diego in San Diego, California. The remainder of 1954 and 1955 were spent providing antisubmarine training services for local surface and air units. In 1956 her range of operations was extended north to Canada and on 24 June 1957 she got underway for an extended Far East patrol that included extensive surveillance of the Russian port of Petropavlovsk. She won a second Battle "E" in 1959.

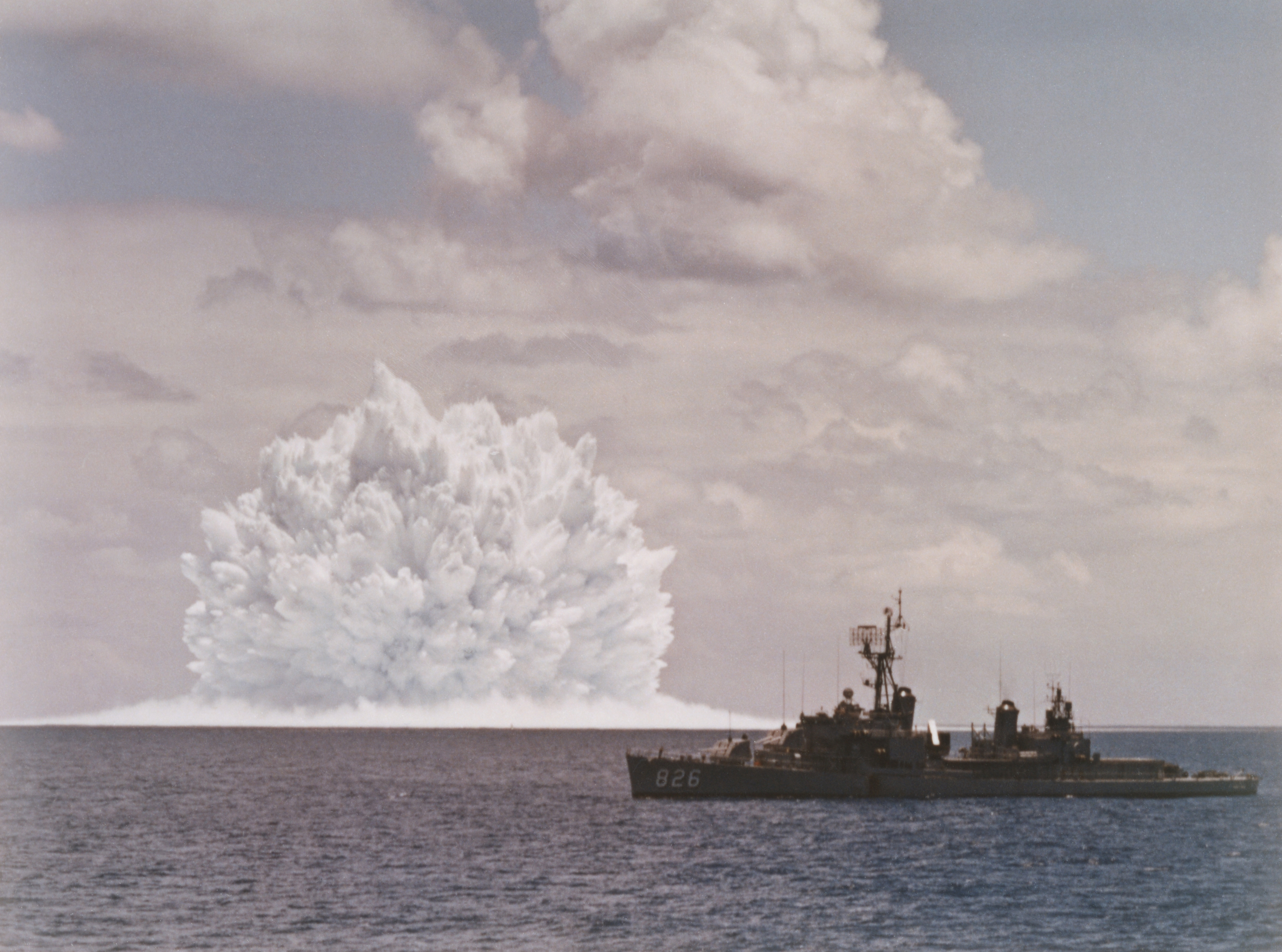
Shot Dominic Swordfish nuclear weapons test. Razorback was submerged 2 nautical miles (3.7 km; 2.3 mi) from the explosion.

On 11 May 1962, Razorback participated in the "SWORDFISH" nuclear weapons test, a test of the ASROC (Anti-Submarine Rocket). An ASROC with a 10-kiloton, W44 nuclear depth charge warhead was fired by the destroyer Agerholm at a target raft from a range of 2 nautical miles (3.7 km). Razorback was submerged at periscope depth approximately 2 miles (3.2 km) from the target raft. The explosion produced an underwater shock wave that shook Razorback. A video of this test is available from the Department of Energy.

Regularly deployed to the Seventh Fleet into the sixties Razorback sailed into the South China Sea on her 1965 deployment where she earned her first Vietnam Service Medal. She returned to San Diego on 1 February 1966, but was in the western Pacific from 29 December 1966 to 3 July 1967 and from 6 August 1968 to February 1969. During 1969 she continued to operate on the west coast out of San Diego, winning her third Battle "E" on 2 July 1969. Razorback's last deployment, again to the western Pacific, was from 30 January to 7 August 1970. During a stopover in Guam, scenes for the film Noon Sunday were shot aboard the boat. Not long after her return to the West Coast, she was decommissioned at Hunter's Point Naval Shipyard. Concurrent with her decommissioning on 30 November, Razorback was transferred to the Turkish Navy.

==== Honors and awards ====
In her 26 years of service in the U.S. Navy Razorback earned five battle stars for World War II service, four campaign stars for Vietnam War service and two awards of the Armed Forces Expeditionary Medal.

=== TCG Muratreis (S-336) ===
The submarine was recommissioned TCG Muratreis (S-336) on 17 December 1971, named after the great Ottoman admiral Murat Reis and served Turkey for 31 years, decommissioning on 8 August 2001.

== After decommissioning ==
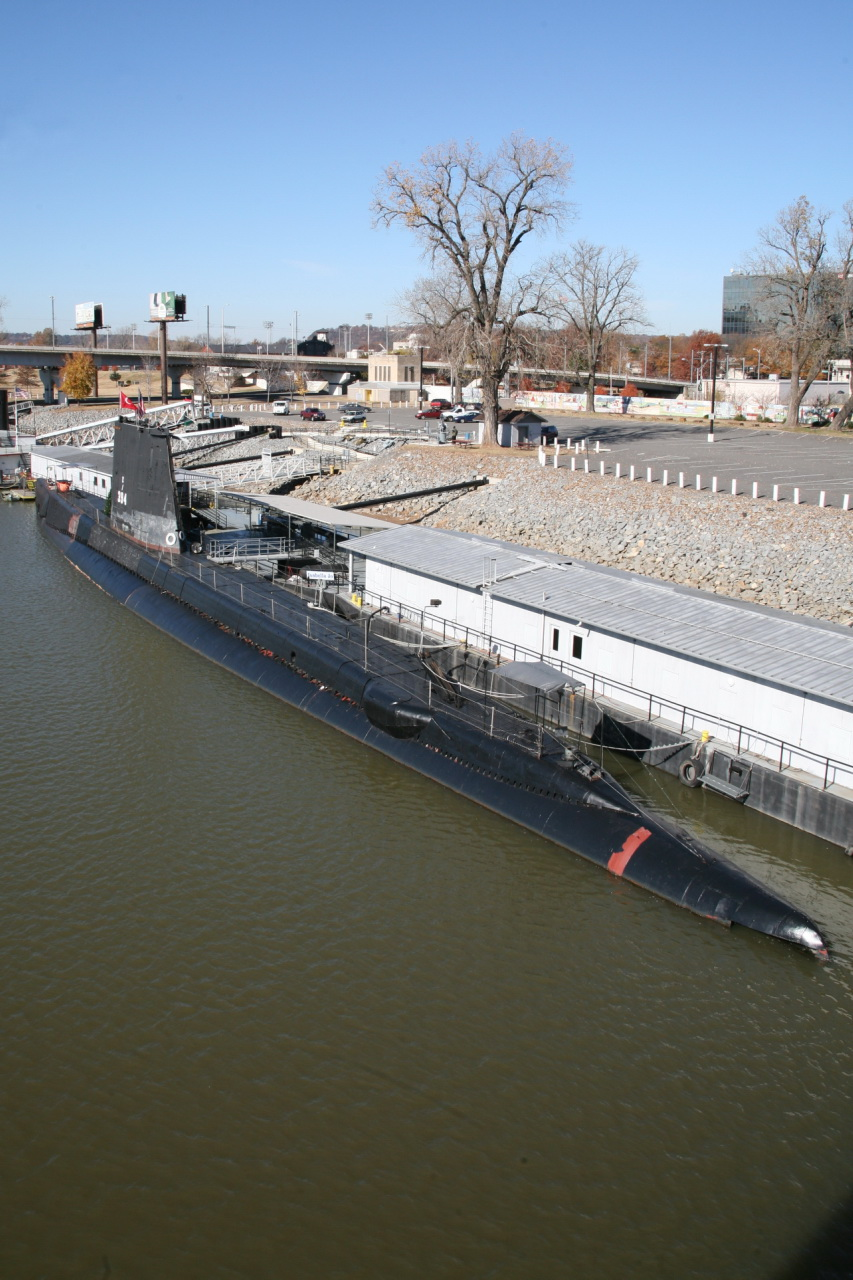
USS Razorback in the Arkansas River.

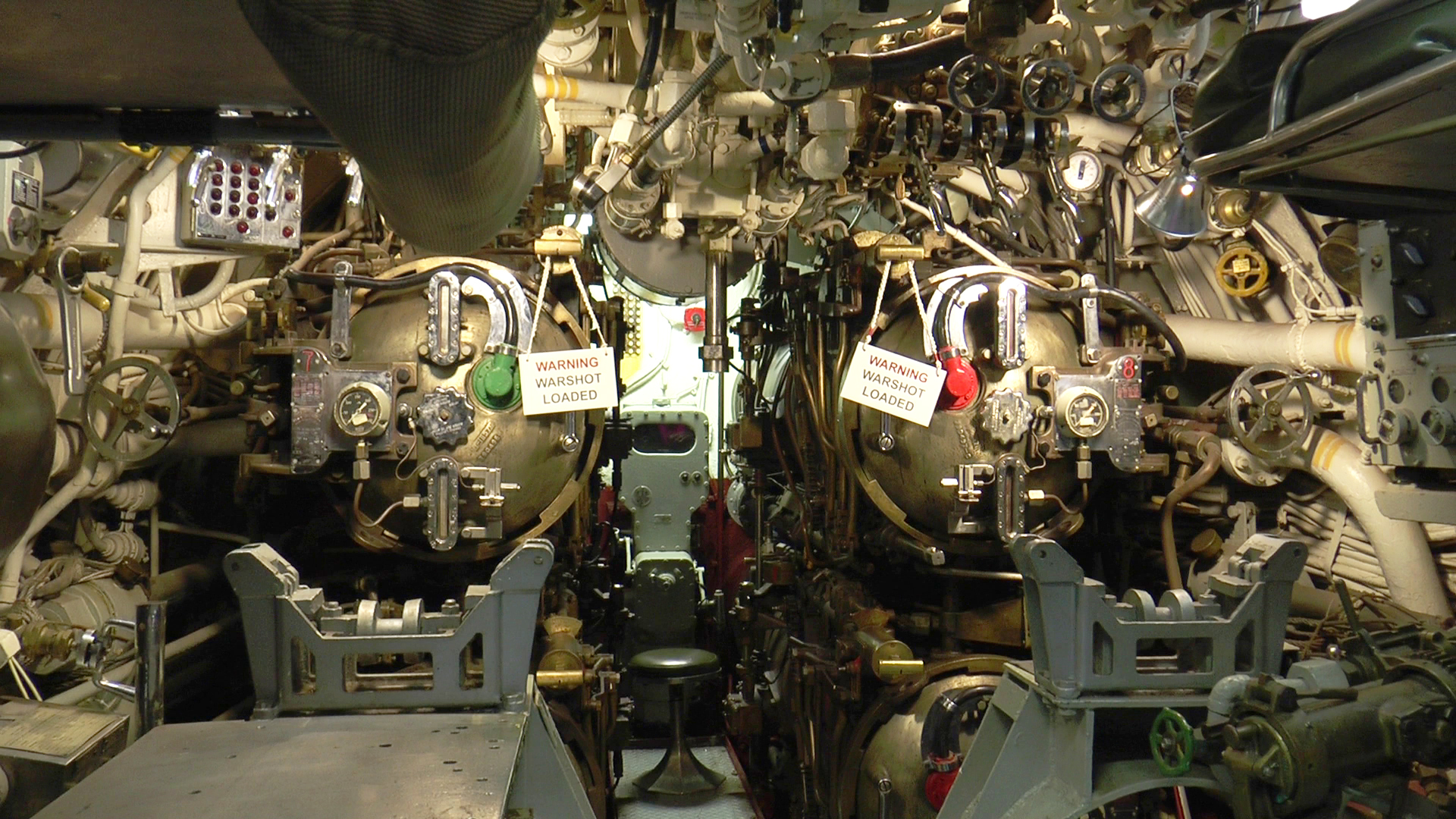
Interior view of bow torpedo room on board USS Razorback.

The city of North Little Rock, Arkansas purchased ex-Muratreis from Turkey on 25 March 2004 for US$37,500. Private donations provided the funds for the purchase and all towing costs.

The submarine departed Turkey under tow on 5 May 2004, crossed the Mediterranean Sea to Gibraltar, and then was towed across the Atlantic Ocean, arriving at Key West, Florida, on the evening of 13 June 2004. On 14 June 2004, she again was taken under tow, and she arrived in New Orleans, Louisiana, on 19 June 2004. From there she was towed up the Mississippi River and the Arkansas River to her permanent berth in North Little Rock.

After a stopover for the dedication of the Montgomery Point Lock and Dam on 16 July, her transit was delayed by the United States Army Corps of Engineers over safety concerns. At the time of transit, she was drafting 11.5 feet (3.5 m) at her bow and at nearly 15 feet (4.6 m) at her stern, while some portions of the Arkansas River were less than 9 feet (2.7 m) deep. A pair of barges were used as pontoons to lift the submarine a few feet to clear the river bottom while remaining low enough to pass under the bridges along her route, just as the submarine USS Batfish (SS-310) had 32 years earlier.

On 29 August 2004, Razorback reached her berth in North Little Rock, at the Arkansas Inland Maritime Museum. She officially opened to the public on 15 May 2005.

Razorback was also the meeting place the Quapaw Area Council Sea Scout ship number 394. Sea Scout Ship 394, as part of the Venturing program, had a particular emphasis on water-based activities. The Sea Scout Ship dissolved after only a few years of being chartered.

Razorback is the subject of a full-length documentary film, "Greyhound of the Sea: USS Razorback," slated for release in 2016. The film is a joint effort between the Arkansas Inland Maritime Museum and the University of Arkansas at Little Rock School of Mass Communication. Razorback shares her shoreline with memorials to the submarines USS Scorpion (SSN-589) and USS Snook (SS-279).

Visitors to the Arkansas Inland Maritime Museum can tour the submarine most Fridays, Saturdays, and Sundays.

== In popular culture ==
The USS Razorback is featured in the fictional book SSN Seadragon The Crucible of Leviathan by J.P. Ronald. Razorback already converted to GUPPY IIA reconnoiters the beaches off Inchon, and lands a covert CIA/Underwater Demolition Team operative to collect vital intelligence in the weeks leading up to the famous Inchon landings of 1950.

== Awards ==

China Service Medal
American Campaign Medal	Asiatic–Pacific Campaign Medal with five battle stars	World War II Victory Medal
Navy Occupation Service Medal	National Defense Service Medal with one star	Armed Forces Expeditionary Medal with six stars
Vietnam Service Medal	Gallantry Cross (Vietnam)	Vietnam Campaign Medal
