= List of Tench-class submarines =

List of Tench-class submarines and their dispositions. 29 of these boats were built during and after World War II, commissioned from October 1944 through February 1951, with 11 commissioned postwar. None of this class were lost in World War II. Ghazi (ex-Diablo (SS-479)) was lost in Pakistani service on 4 December 1971 during the Indo-Pakistani Naval War of 1971, sank by INS Rajput. Some of the class served actively in the US Navy through the middle 1970s, others served into the 1990s with foreign navies, and one (Hai Shih ex-Cutlass) is still active in Taiwan's Republic of China Navy.

The primary improvement of the Tench and Balao classes over the preceding Gato class was an increase in test depth from 300 feet (91 m) to 400 feet (120 m). This, combined with less wartime service than previous classes, led to these classes being preferred for modernization programs and active postwar service. 16 Tenches were modernized under various GUPPY conversion programs, plus 8 received the more austere "Fleet Snorkel" modernization.

== Cancellations ==
A total of 125 U.S. submarines were cancelled during World War II, all but three between 29 July 1944 and 12 August 1945. The exceptions were USS Wahoo (SS-516), USS Unicorn (SS-436), and USS Walrus (SS-437), cancelled 7 January 1946. References vary considerably as to how many of these were Balaos and how many were Tenches. Some references simply assume all submarines numbered after SS-416 were Tench class; however, USS Trumpetfish (SS-425) and USS Tusk (SS-426) were completed as Balaos. This yields 10 cancelled Balao-class, SS-353-360 and 379-380. The Register of Ships of the U. S. Navy differs, considering every submarine not specifically ordered as a Tench to be a Balao, and further projecting SS-551-562 as a future class. This yields 62 cancelled Balao class, 51 cancelled Tench class, and 12 cancelled SS-551 class. This article follows the information in the "Register". Two of the cancelled Balao-class submarines, Turbot and Ulua, were launched incomplete and served for years as experimental hulks at Annapolis and Norfolk, Virginia. Two of the cancelled Tench-class boats, Unicorn and Walrus, were also launched incomplete, never commissioned, but listed with the Reserve fleet until struck in 1958 and scrapped in 1959. The cancelled hull numbers, including those launched incomplete, were SS-353-360 (Balao), 379–380 (Balao), 427–434 (Balao), 436–437 (Tench), 438–474 (Balao), 491–521 (Tench), 526-529 (Tench), 530–536 (Balao), 537-550 (Tench), and 551-562 (SS-551 class).

== Abbreviations ==
Abbreviations and hull classification symbols for postwar redesignations/conversions:

- AGSS — auxiliary submarine (various roles including sonar testing and some pierside trainers)
- FS — "fleet snorkel" conversion, including a snorkel and streamlined sail
- G IA, G II, etc. — various GUPPY conversions, usually including a snorkel, streamlined sail, improved batteries, and upgraded sonar and electronics
- IXSS — unclassified submarine
- PT — pierside trainer for naval reservists, reportedly immobilized by removing the propellers
- SSR — radar picket submarine
- Struck — Struck (deleted) from the Naval Vessel Register, usually followed by scrapping or other final disposal, or sale to a foreign navy

== Ships in class ==
Construction data
Ship Name	Hull no.	Builder	Laid down	Launched	Comm./Recomm.	Decomm.	Fate
Tench	SS-417	Portsmouth Naval Shipyard, Kittery, Maine	1 Apr 1944	7 Jul 1944	6 Oct 1944	January 1947	G IA 1951, AGSS 1 Oct 1969, SS 30 Jun 1971; struck 15 Aug 1973, sold to Peru for spares 16 Sep 1976
Tench	SS-417	Portsmouth Naval Shipyard, Kittery, Maine	1 Apr 1944	7 Jul 1944	October 1950	8 May 1970	G IA 1951, AGSS 1 Oct 1969, SS 30 Jun 1971; struck 15 Aug 1973, sold to Peru for spares 16 Sep 1976
Thornback	SS-418	Portsmouth Naval Shipyard, Kittery, Maine	5 Apr 1944	7 Jul 1944	13 Oct 1944	6 Apr 1946	G IIA 1953; transferred to Turkey as Uluçalireis 1 Jul 1971; struck and sold to Turkey 1 Aug 1973, decommissioned 7 Aug 2000, memorial at the Rahmi M. Koç Museum in Istanbul, Turkey
Thornback	SS-418	Portsmouth Naval Shipyard, Kittery, Maine	5 Apr 1944	7 Jul 1944	2 Oct 1953	1 Jul 1971	G IIA 1953; transferred to Turkey as Uluçalireis 1 Jul 1971; struck and sold to Turkey 1 Aug 1973, decommissioned 7 Aug 2000, memorial at the Rahmi M. Koç Museum in Istanbul, Turkey
Tigrone	SS-419	Portsmouth Naval Shipyard, Kittery, Maine	8 May 1944	20 Jul 1944	25 Oct 1944	30 Mar 1946	SSR 5 Apr 1948, SS 1 Mar 1961, AGSS (sonar test boat) 1 Dec 1963; struck 27 Jun 1975, sunk as target 25 Oct 1976
Tigrone	SS-419	Portsmouth Naval Shipyard, Kittery, Maine	8 May 1944	20 Jul 1944	1 Nov 1948	1 Nov 1957	SSR 5 Apr 1948, SS 1 Mar 1961, AGSS (sonar test boat) 1 Dec 1963; struck 27 Jun 1975, sunk as target 25 Oct 1976
Tigrone	SS-419	Portsmouth Naval Shipyard, Kittery, Maine	8 May 1944	20 Jul 1944	10 Mar 1962	27 Jun 1975	SSR 5 Apr 1948, SS 1 Mar 1961, AGSS (sonar test boat) 1 Dec 1963; struck 27 Jun 1975, sunk as target 25 Oct 1976
Tirante	SS-420	Portsmouth Naval Shipyard, Kittery, Maine	28 Apr 1944	9 Aug 1944	6 Nov 1944	20 Jul 1946	G IIA 1953; struck 1 Oct 1973, sold for scrap 21 Mar 1974
Tirante	SS-420	Portsmouth Naval Shipyard, Kittery, Maine	28 Apr 1944	9 Aug 1944	26 Nov 1952	1 Oct 1973	G IIA 1953; struck 1 Oct 1973, sold for scrap 21 Mar 1974
Trutta	SS-421	Portsmouth Naval Shipyard, Kittery, Maine	22 May 1944	18 Aug 1944	16 Nov 1944	March 1946	G IIA 1953; struck and sold to Turkey as Cerbe 1 Jul 1972; decommissioned 23 Jul 1999, sold for scrap on unknown date
Trutta	SS-421	Portsmouth Naval Shipyard, Kittery, Maine	22 May 1944	18 Aug 1944	1 Mar 1951	14 May 1952	G IIA 1953; struck and sold to Turkey as Cerbe 1 Jul 1972; decommissioned 23 Jul 1999, sold for scrap on unknown date
Trutta	SS-421	Portsmouth Naval Shipyard, Kittery, Maine	22 May 1944	18 Aug 1944	2 Jan 1953	1 Jul 1972	G IIA 1953; struck and sold to Turkey as Cerbe 1 Jul 1972; decommissioned 23 Jul 1999, sold for scrap on unknown date
Toro	SS-422	Portsmouth Naval Shipyard, Kittery, Maine	27 May 1944	23 Aug 1944	8 Dec 1944	2 Feb 1946	AGSS 1 Jul 1962; struck 1 Apr 1963, sold for scrap April 1965
Toro	SS-422	Portsmouth Naval Shipyard, Kittery, Maine	27 May 1944	23 Aug 1944	13 May 1947	11 Mar 1963	AGSS 1 Jul 1962; struck 1 Apr 1963, sold for scrap April 1965
Torsk	SS-423	Portsmouth Naval Shipyard, Kittery, Maine	7 Jun 1944	6 Sep 1944	16 Dec 1944	4 Mar 1968	FS 1952, AGSS 1 May 1968, PT 1968-1971, IXSS 30 Jun 1971; struck 15 Dec 1971, memorial in Baltimore, Maryland
Torsk	SS-423	Portsmouth Naval Shipyard, Kittery, Maine	7 Jun 1944	6 Sep 1944	4 Mar 1968	15 Dec 1971	FS 1952, AGSS 1 May 1968, PT 1968-1971, IXSS 30 Jun 1971; struck 15 Dec 1971, memorial in Baltimore, Maryland
Quillback	SS-424	Portsmouth Naval Shipyard, Kittery, Maine	27 Jun 1944	1 Oct 1944	29 Dec 1944	April 1952	G IIA 1953; struck 23 Mar 1973, sold for scrap 21 Mar 1974
Quillback	SS-424	Portsmouth Naval Shipyard, Kittery, Maine	27 Jun 1944	1 Oct 1944	27 Feb 1953	23 Mar 1973	G IIA 1953; struck 23 Mar 1973, sold for scrap 21 Mar 1974
Corsair	SS-435	Electric Boat Company, Groton, Connecticut	1 Mar 1945	3 May 1946	8 Nov 1946	1 Feb 1963	AGSS 1 Apr 1960; struck 1 Feb 1963, sold for scrap 21 Oct 1963
Unicorn	SS-436	Electric Boat Company, Groton, Connecticut	21 Jun 1945	1 Aug 1946	—N/a	—N/a	Cancelled 7 Jan 1946, suspended 30 Jan 1946, reinstated 26 Feb 1946, accepted but never commissioned 3 Sep 1946, placed in reserve fleet; struck 9 Jun 1958, sold for scrap 10 Jul 1959
Walrus	SS-437	Electric Boat Company, Groton, Connecticut	21 Jun 1945	20 Sep 1946	—N/a	—N/a	Cancelled 7 Jan 1946, suspended 30 Jan 1946, reinstated 26 Feb 1946, accepted but never commissioned 2 Oct 1946, placed in reserve fleet; struck 9 Jun 1958, sold for scrap 7 Oct 1959
Argonaut	SS-475	Portsmouth Naval Shipyard, Kittery, Maine	28 Jun 1944	1 Oct 1944	15 Jan 1945	2 Dec 1968	FS 1952; struck and sold to Canada as Rainbow 2 Dec 1968; decommissioned by Canada 31 Dec 1974, sold for scrap 24 Mar 1977
Runner	SS-476	Portsmouth Naval Shipyard, Kittery, Maine	10 Jul 1945	17 Oct 1944	6 Feb 1945	29 Jun 1970	FS 1952, AGSS 1 Feb 1969, PT 1970-1971, IXSS 30 Jun 1971; struck 15 Dec 1971, sold for scrap 19 Jun 1973
Runner	SS-476	Portsmouth Naval Shipyard, Kittery, Maine	10 Jul 1945	17 Oct 1944	29 Jun 1970	15 Dec 1971	FS 1952, AGSS 1 Feb 1969, PT 1970-1971, IXSS 30 Jun 1971; struck 15 Dec 1971, sold for scrap 19 Jun 1973
Conger	SS-477	Portsmouth Naval Shipyard, Kittery, Maine	11 Jul 1944	17 Oct 1944	14 Feb 1945	29 Jul 1963	AGSS 9 Mar 1962; struck 1 Aug 1963, sold for scrap 9 Jul 1964
Cutlass	SS-478	Portsmouth Naval Shipyard, Kittery, Maine	22 Jul 1944	5 Nov 1944	17 Mar 1945	12 Apr 1973	G II 1948; struck and sold to Taiwan as Hai Shih 12 Apr 1973, reportedly still in service
Diablo	SS-479	Portsmouth Naval Shipyard, Kittery, Maine	11 Aug 1944	1 Dec 1944	31 Mar 1945	1 Jun 1964	AGSS 19 Jul 1962, FS 1964; struck and transferred to Pakistan as Ghazi on 1 Jun 1964, sank under mysterious circumstances on 4 Dec 1971
Medregal	SS-480	Portsmouth Naval Shipyard, Kittery, Maine	21 Aug 1944	15 Dec 1944	14 Apr 1945	1 Aug 1970	FS 1952, AGSS 1 May 1967, SS 1 Oct 1969; struck 1 Aug 1970, sold for scrap 13 Jun 1972
Requin	SS-481	Portsmouth Naval Shipyard, Kittery, Maine	24 Aug 1944	1 Jan 1945	28 Apr 1945	2 Dec 1968	Radar picket 1946, redesignated as SSR 20 Jan 1948, SS 15 Aug 1959, AGSS 29 Jun 1968, PT 1969-1971, IXSS 30 Jun 1971; struck 20 Dec 1971, memorial in Pittsburgh, PA
Requin	SS-481	Portsmouth Naval Shipyard, Kittery, Maine	24 Aug 1944	1 Jan 1945	2 Dec 1968	20 Dec 1971	Radar picket 1946, redesignated as SSR 20 Jan 1948, SS 15 Aug 1959, AGSS 29 Jun 1968, PT 1969-1971, IXSS 30 Jun 1971; struck 20 Dec 1971, memorial in Pittsburgh, PA
Irex	SS-482	Portsmouth Naval Shipyard, Kittery, Maine	2 Oct 1944	26 Jan 1945	14 May 1945	17 Nov 1969	Prototype FS 1947, AGSS 30 Jun 1969; struck 17 Nov 1969, sold for scrap 13 Sep 1971
Sea Leopard	SS-483	Portsmouth Naval Shipyard, Kittery, Maine	7 Nov 1944	2 Mar 1945	11 Jun 1945	27 Mar 1973	G II 1949; struck and sold to Brazil as Bahia 27 Mar 1973; decommissioned and scrapped 1998
Odax	SS-484	Portsmouth Naval Shipyard, Kittery, Maine	4 Dec 1944	10 Apr 1945	11 Jul 1945	8 Jul 1972	G I 1947, G II 1951; struck and sold to Brazil as Rio de Janeiro 8 Jul 1972; decommissioned 16 Nov 1978, sold for scrap 18 Jun 1981
Sirago	SS-485	Portsmouth Naval Shipyard, Kittery, Maine	3 Jan 1945	11 May 1945	13 Aug 1945	1 Jun 1972	G II 1949; struck 1 Jun 1972, sold for scrap 2 May 1973
Pomodon	SS-486	Portsmouth Naval Shipyard, Kittery, Maine	29 Jan 1945	12 Jun 1945	11 Sep 1945	1 Apr 1955	G I 1947, G II 1951; struck 1 Aug 1970, sold for scrap 26 Jan 1972
Pomodon	SS-486	Portsmouth Naval Shipyard, Kittery, Maine	29 Jan 1945	12 Jun 1945	2 Jul 1955	1 Aug 1970	G I 1947, G II 1951; struck 1 Aug 1970, sold for scrap 26 Jan 1972
Remora	SS-487	Portsmouth Naval Shipyard, Kittery, Maine	5 Mar 1945	12 Jul 1945	3 Jan 1946	29 Oct 1973	G II 1947, G III 1962; struck and sold to Greece as Katsonis 29 Oct 1973; decommissioned 30 Mar 1993, sold for scrap on unknown date
Sarda	SS-488	Portsmouth Naval Shipyard, Kittery, Maine	12 Apr 1945	24 Aug 1945	19 Apr 1946	1 Jun 1964	AGSS 19 Jul 1962; struck 1 Jun 1964, sold for scrap 14 May 1965
Spinax	SS-489	Portsmouth Naval Shipyard, Kittery, Maine	14 May 1945	20 Nov 1945	20 Sep 1946	11 Oct 1969	Completed as radar picket, redesignated as SSR 20 Jan 1948, SS 15 Aug 1959, AGSS 30 Jun 1969; struck 11 Oct 1969, sold for scrap 13 Jun 1972
Volador	SS-490	Portsmouth Naval Shipyard, Kittery, Maine	15 Jun 1945	21 May 1948	1 Oct 1948	18 Aug 1972	Suspended 30 Jan 1946, completed as G II 1948, G III 1963; transferred to Italy as Gianfranco Gazzana Priaroggia 18 Aug 1972, struck and sold to Italy 5 Dec 1977; struck by Italy 31 May 1981, fate unknown
Pompano	SS-491	Portsmouth Naval Shipyard, Kittery, Maine	16 Jul 1945	—N/a	—N/a	—N/a	Cancelled 12 Aug 1945, broken up on slip
Grayling	SS-492	Portsmouth Naval Shipyard, Kittery, Maine	—N/a	—N/a	—N/a	—N/a	Cancelled 12 Aug 1945
Needlefish	SS-493	Portsmouth Naval Shipyard, Kittery, Maine	—N/a	—N/a	—N/a	—N/a	Cancelled 12 Aug 1945
Sculpin	SS-494	Portsmouth Naval Shipyard, Kittery, Maine	—N/a	—N/a	—N/a	—N/a	Cancelled 12 Aug 1945
—N/a	SS-495 – SS-515	Portsmouth Naval Shipyard, Kittery, Maine	—N/a	—N/a	—N/a	—N/a	Cancelled 29 Jul 1944
Wahoo	SS-516	Mare Island Naval Shipyard, Vallejo, California	15 May 1944	—N/a	—N/a	—N/a	Cancelled 7 Jan 1946, broken up on slip
—N/a	SS-517	Mare Island Naval Shipyard, Vallejo, California	29 Jun 1944	—N/a	—N/a	—N/a	Cancelled 29 Jul 1944, broken up on slip
Wahoo	SS-518	Mare Island Naval Shipyard, Vallejo, California	—N/a	—N/a	—N/a	—N/a	Cancelled 29 Jul 1944
—N/a	SS-519 – SS-521	Mare Island Naval Shipyard, Vallejo, California	—N/a	—N/a	—N/a	—N/a	Cancelled 29 Jul 1944
Amberjack	SS-522	Boston Naval Shipyard, Charlestown, Massachusetts	8 Feb 1944	15 Dec 1944	4 Mar 1946	17 Oct 1973	G II 1947; struck and sold to Brazil as Ceará 17 Oct 1973, fate unknown
Grampus	SS-523	Boston Naval Shipyard, Charlestown, Massachusetts	8 Feb 1944	15 Dec 1944	26 Oct 1949	13 May 1972	Suspended 17 Jan 1946, completed as G II; struck and sold to Brazil as Rio Grande do Sul 13 May 1972, sold for scrap 18 Jun 1981
Pickerel	SS-524	Boston Naval Shipyard, Charlestown, Massachusetts	8 Feb 1944	15 Dec 1944	4 Apr 1949	18 Aug 1972	Suspended 17 Jan 1946, completed as G II, G III 1962; struck and transferred to Italy as Primo Longobordo 18 Aug 1972, sold to Italy 5 Dec 1977; decommissioned by Italy 31 Jan 1980, sold for scrap 31 May 1981
Grenadier	SS-525	Boston Naval Shipyard, Charlestown, Massachusetts	8 Feb 1944	15 Dec 1944	10 Feb 1951	15 May 1973	Suspended 17 Jan 1946, completed as G II; struck and sold to Venezuela as Picua 15 May 1973; decommissioned by Venezuela 16 Nov 1978, struck 1 Jan 1980, sold for scrap 18 Jun 1981
Dorado	SS-526	Boston Naval Shipyard, Charlestown, Massachusetts	—N/a	—N/a	—N/a	—N/a	Cancelled 29 Jul 1944
Comber	SS-527	Boston Naval Shipyard, Charlestown, Massachusetts	—N/a	—N/a	—N/a	—N/a	Cancelled 29 Jul 1944
Sea Panther	SS-528	Boston Naval Shipyard, Charlestown, Massachusetts	—N/a	—N/a	—N/a	—N/a	Cancelled 29 Jul 1944
Tiburon	SS-529	Boston Naval Shipyard, Charlestown, Massachusetts	—N/a	—N/a	—N/a	—N/a	Cancelled 29 Jul 1944
—N/a	SS-537 – SS-544	Boston Naval Shipyard, Charlestown, Massachusetts	—N/a	—N/a	—N/a	—N/a	Cancelled 29 Jul 1944
—N/a	SS-545 – SS-547	Electric Boat Company, Groton, Connecticut	—N/a	—N/a	—N/a	—N/a	Cancelled 28 Mar 1945
—N/a	SS-548 – SS-550	Portsmouth Naval Shipyard, Kittery, Maine	—N/a	—N/a	—N/a	—N/a	Cancelled 27 Mar 1945

== See also ==
- List of Gato-class submarines
- List of Balao-class submarines
