= List of submarine classes of the United States Navy =

Submarines of the United States Navy are built in classes, using a single design for a number of boats. Minor variations occur as improvements are incorporated into the design, so later boats of a class may be more capable than earlier. Also, boats are modified, sometimes extensively, while in service, creating departures from the class standard. However, in general, all boats of a class are noticeably similar.

Experimental use: an example is USS Albacore (AGSS-569), which used an unprecedented hull design. In this list such single boat "classes" are marked with "(unique)".

== Pre–World War I ==
Pre–World War I
Class name	No.	Laid down	Last comm.	Notes
Alligator	1	1861	1862	First submarine in the U.S. Navy. Purpose was to protect wooden ships against ironclads.
Holland	1	1896	1900	5 others were made; only Holland (SS-1) entered the U.S. Navy as it was the first officially commissioned submarine purchased on 11 April 1900.
Plunger	7	1900	1903	Later renamed A class in November 1911, when Navy stopped naming submarines. Essentially enlarged, more powerful Holland.
Viper	3	1905	1907	Last in series of Holland-like submarines. Later renamed to B class.
Octopus	5	1905	1910	Designed by Lawrence York Spear. Later renamed to C class.
Narwhal	3	1908	1910	Later renamed to D class. Designed to survive flooding in one compartment.
E	2	1909	1912	First US Navy diesel-powered submarine. Known as "pig boats", or "boats", due to foul living quarters and unusual hull shape.
F	4	1909	1913	In 1920, the class was designated SS-20–SS-23.
G	4	1909	1914	Used gasoline engine. G-1 (SS-19½) set the submerged depth record in 1915, 256 feet (78 m). G-1 (SS-19½) was given the number 19½ because SS- numbers were given after her decommissioning; she was between SS-19 & SS-20.
H	9	1911	1918	3 originally ordered by U.S. Navy. 17 ordered by the Imperial Russian Navy, 11 delivered. Other 6 bought by U.S. Navy. Known as "pig boats", or "boats", due to foul living quarters and unusual hull shape.
K	8	1912	1912	Known as "pig boats", or "boats", due to foul living quarters and unusual hull shape. K-1 (SS-32), K-2 (SS-33), K-5 (SS-36), K-6 (SS-37) were the first U.S. submarines to see action in World War I.
L	11	1914	1918	The first US submarines with a deck gun. Known as "pig boats", or "boats", due to foul living quarters and unusual hull shape. Designed for coastal defense.
M-1	1	1914	1918	Double-hull design. Twenty percent larger than the K class. Known as "pig boats", or "boats", due to foul living quarters and unusual hull shape. Considered failure by the submarine community.
N	7	1915	1918	Known as "pig boats", or "boats", due to foul living quarters and unusual hull shape. Used for coastal patrol.
O	16	1916	1918	Each cost $550,000. First submarines with reliable diesel engines. Every man had his own berth and locker. Known as "pig boats", or "boats", due to foul living quarters and unusual hull shape. O-11 through O-16 (built by Lake Torpedo Boat Company) also known as the "modified O-class". Modified boats proved to be disappointing and were scrapped in 1930; Lake went out of business in 1925.
AA-1	3	1916	1922	Later renamed T class. Designed for 5,540 miles (8,920 km) at 14 knots (7.2 m/s), but performed 3,000 miles (4,800 km) at 11 knots (5.7 m/s). Prototype "fleet submarines"—submarines fast enough (21 knots (11 m/s)) to travel with battleships. Twice the size of any concurrent or past U.S. submarine. A poor tandem engine design caused the boats to be decommissioned by 1923 and scrapped in 1930.

== World War I ==
World War I
Class name	No.	Laid down	Last comm.	Notes
R	20	1917	1918	Larger conning tower to serve as commanding officer's battle station. Fired Mark 10 torpedoes and traveled 5,000 miles (8,000 km) at 10 knots (5.1 m/s).
R-21	7	1917	1919	Designed by Simon Lake. Generally similar to R class, but smaller and reverted to 18-inch torpedo tubes. Scrapped in 1930; Lake went out of business in 1925.
S	51	1917	1922	The S class is subdivided into four groups of different designs.

== Interwar ==
Interwar
Class name	No.	First ship laid down	Last ship commissioned	Notes
Barracuda	3	USS Barracuda (SS-163) and USS Bass (SS-164); 20 October 1921	USS Bonita (SS-165); 22 May 1926	
Argonaut	1	1 May 1925	2 April 1928	Unique submarine; mine-laying submarine
Narwhal	2	USS Narwhal (SS-167); 10 May 1927	USS Nautilus (SS-168); 1 July 1930	
Dolphin	1	14 June 1930	1 June 1932	Unique submarine
Cachalot	2	USS Cachalot (SS-170); 7 October 1931	USS Cuttlefish (SS-171); 8 June 1934	
Porpoise	10	USS Porpoise (SS-172); 24 October 1933	USS Pompano (SS-181); 12 June 1937	
Salmon	6	USS Salmon (SS-182); 15 April 1936	USS Skipjack (SS-184); 30 June 1938	
Sargo	10	USS Sargo (SS-188); 12 May 1937	USS Seawolf (SS-197); 1 December 1939	
Tambor	12	USS Tambor (SS-198); 16 January 1939	USS Grayback (SS-208); 30 June 1941	
Mackerel	2	USS Mackerel (SS-204); 6 October 1939	USS Marlin (SS-205); 1 August 1941	
Gato	77	USS Drum (SS-228); 11 September 1940	USS Croaker (SS-246); 21 April 1944	USS Drum was only boat actually commissioned before US Entry to WWII

== World War II ==
World War II
Class name	No.	First ship laid down	Last ship commissioned	Notes
Balao	120	USS Devilfish (SS-292); 31 March 1942	USS Tiru (SS-416); 1 September 1948	62 cancelled
Tench	29	USS Amberjack (SS-522), USS Grampus (SS-523), USS Pickerel (SS-524), and USS Grenadier (SS-525); 8 February 1944	USS Grenadier (SS-525); 10 February 1951	51 cancelled

== Cold War ==
=== Diesel-Electric Submarines (SSs, SSKs, and SSGs) ===
Class Name	No.	First boat laid down	Last boat commissioned	Notes	Silhouette/Image
Barracuda	3	USS Barracuda (SSK-1); 1 July 1949	USS Bonita (SSK-3); 11 January 1952		
Tang	6	USS Tang (SS-563); 18 April 1949	USS Gudgeon (SS-567); 21 November 1952		
Grayback	2	USS Grayback (SSG-574); 1 July 1954	USS Growler (SSG-577); 30 August 1958	Regulus missile submarines	
Darter	1	10 November 1954	20 October 1956	Unique submarine	
Barbel	3	USS Barbel (SS-580); 18 May 1956	USS Blueback (SS-581); 15 October 1959	First production submarines with teardrop hull. U.S. Navy's last conventionally-powered submarines	

=== Nuclear Attack Submarines (SSNs) ===
Class Name	No.	First boat laid down	Last boat commissioned	Notes	Silhouette/Image
Nautilus	1	14 June 1952	30 September 1954	First nuclear submarine; hull design enlarged from fleet boat	
Seawolf	1	7 December 1953	30 March 1957	Unique submarine; liquid metal cooled (sodium) S2G reactor (replaced with a pressurized-water reactor in 1959)	
Skate	4	USS Skate (SSN-578); 21 July 1955	USS Seadragon (SSN-584); 5 December 1959		
Skipjack	6	USS Skipjack (SSN-585); 29 May 1956	USS Snook (SSN-592); 24 October 1961	First nuclear submarine class with teardrop hull form. USS Scorpion lost at sea 1968.	
Thresher/Permit	14	USS Thresher (SSN-593); 28 May 1958	USS Gato (SSN-615); 25 January 1968	First class with bow sonar sphere. Known as Thresher class until the loss of the USS Thresher (SSN-593) in 1963	
Tullibee	1	26 May 1958	9 November 1960	Unique submarine; turbo-electric transmission	
Sturgeon	37	USS Sturgeon (SSN-637); 10 August 1963	USS Richard B. Russell (SSN-687); 16 August 1975	Redesign of Thresher/Permit class using lessons learned from loss of Thresher.	
Narwhal	1	17 January 1966	12 July 1969	Unique submarine; natural circulation S5G reactor	
Glenard P. Lipscomb	1	5 June 1971	21 December 1974	Unique submarine; turbo-electric transmission	
Los Angeles	62	USS Los Angeles (SSN-688); 8 January 1972	USS Cheyenne (SSN-773); 13 September 1996		
Seawolf	3	USS Seawolf (SSN-21); 25 October 1989	USS Jimmy Carter (SSN-23); 19 February 2005	Planned successor of Los Angeles class. High costs caused only three to be built.	

=== Nuclear Cruise Missile Submarines (SSGNs) ===
Note: Several boats were converted into cruise missile submarines after construction; the USS Halibut was the only purpose built SSGN of the US Navy
Class Name	No.	First boat laid down	Last boat commissioned	Notes	Picture/Silhouette
Halibut	1	11 April 1957	4 January 1960	Unique submarine; Regulus missile submarine	

=== Nuclear Ballistic Missile Submarines (SSBNs) ===
Class Name	No.	First boat laid down	Last boat commissioned	Notes	Picture/Silhouette
George Washington	5	USS George Washington (SSBN-598); 1 November 1957	USS Abraham Lincoln (SSBN-602); 11 March 1961		
Ethan Allen	5	USS Ethan Allen (SSBN-608); 14 September 1959	USS Thomas Jefferson (SSBN-618); 4 January 1963	Ethan Allen was the only SSBN to fire live missile and detonate nuclear warhead at test range proving theory.	
Lafayette	9	USS Lafayette (SSBN-616); 17 January 1961	USS Daniel Webster (SSBN-626); 09 April 1964		
James Madison	10	USS Daniel Boone (SSBN-629); 6 February 1962	USS Nathanael Greene (SSBN-636); 19 December 1964		
Benjamin Franklin	12	USS Benjamin Franklin (SSBN-640); 25 May 1963	USS Will Rogers (SSBN-659); 1 April 1967	Redesigned using lessons learned from loss of Thresher.	
Ohio	18	USS Ohio (SSBN-726); 10 April 1976	USS Louisiana (SSBN-743); 6 September 1997		

=== Deep-submergence vehicles (DSVs) ===
Class Name	No.	First boat laid down	Last boat commissioned	Notes	Picture/Silhouette
Trieste class	2	Trieste (DSV-0); 1958	Trieste II (DSV-1); 1969	The Trieste was the first submarine which reached the Challenger Deep by Swiss Jacques Piccard and US Navy Lieutenant Don Walsh in 1960.	
Alvin class	4	Alvin (DSV-2); 5 June 1964	Nemo (DSV-5); 1970		
NR-1	1	10 June 1967	27 October 1969		

=== Miscellaneous Submarines (SSTs, SSRs, AGSSs & SSRNs) ===
Class Name	No.	First boat laid down	Last boat commissioned	Notes
Albacore	1	15 March 1952	6 December 1953	Unique submarine; teardrop hull form; no weapons
T-1	2	USS T-1, later USS Mackerel (SST-1); 1 April 1952	USS T-2, later USS Marlin (SST-2); 20 November 1953	Training and experimental submarines
Sailfish	2	USS Sailfish (SSR-572); 8 December 1953	USS Salmon (SSR-573); 25 August 1956	Radar picket
Triton	1	29 May 1956	10 November 1959	Unique submarine; Radar picket; Twin S4G Nuclear Reactors
Dolphin	1	9 November 1962	17 August 1968	Unique submarine; research and development for deep diving technologies; last operational U.S. Navy diesel-electric submarine; Decommissioned 15 January 2007

== Post–Cold War ==
Post–Cold War
Class name	Number of boats	First boat laid down	Last boat commissioned	Notes
Virginia	24 (of 66 planned)	USS Virginia (SSN-774); 2 September 1999	USS Massachusetts (SSN-798); March 28, 2026	Attack submarine.
Columbia	12 (planned)	USS District of Columbia (SSBN-826) (planned)		Ballistic missile submarine

== See also ==
- Submarines in the United States Navy
- List of submarines of the United States Navy
  - List of Gato class submarines
  - List of Balao class submarines
  - List of Tench class submarines
  - List of Sturgeon class submarines
  - List of Los Angeles class submarines
- List of most successful American submarines in World War II
- Allied submarines in the Pacific War
- List of submarines of the Second World War
- List of ship classes of the Second World War
- List of United States Navy ships
