= TCG Cerbe =

TCG Cerbe is the name of the following submarines of the Turkish Navy:

- TCG Cerbe (S 341), ex-USS Hammerhead (SS-364), a Gato-class submarine acquired in 1954 and decommissioned in 1972
- TCG Cerbe (S 340), ex-USS Trutta (SS-421), a Tench-class submarine acquired in 1972 and decommissioned in 1999
