= List of Gato-class submarines =

Seventy-seven Gato-class submarines were built during World War II, commissioned from November 1941 through April 1944. The class was very successful in sinking Japanese merchant ships and naval vessels: the top three US submarines in tonnage sunk were Gatos, along with three of the top seven in number of ships sunk. But success had a price: 20 of the 52 US submarines lost in that war were of this class, plus Halibut, a damaged boat that returned to the US but was considered a constructive total loss and not repaired. Although many of the class were in reserve postwar and scrapped in 1959-1960, some Gatos served actively with the US Navy into the late 1960s, and others served with foreign navies into the early 1970s.SS-361 through SS-364 were initially ordered as Balao-class and were assigned hull numbers that fall in the middle of the range of numbers for the Balao class (SS-285 through SS-416 & SS-425–426). Thus, in some references they are listed with that class. However, they were completed by Manitowoc as Gatos, due to an unavoidable delay in Electric Boat's development of Balao-class drawings. Manitowoc was a follow yard to Electric Boat and was dependent on them for designs and drawings.

== Abbreviations ==
Abbreviations and hull classification symbols for postwar redesignations/conversions:

- AGSS—auxiliary submarine (various roles, including sonar testing)
- APSS/LPSS — amphibious transport submarine
- FS — "fleet snorkel" conversion, including a snorkel and streamlined sail
- G IB — GUPPY IB conversion, including a snorkel, streamlined sail, and improved batteries
- IXSS — unclassified submarine
- PT—pier-side trainer for naval reservists, reportedly immobilized by removing the propellers
- SSG — guided missile submarine
- SSK — hunter-killer submarine
- SSO/AOSS — submarine oiler conversion
- SSR — radar picket submarine
- Struck — Struck (deleted) from the Naval Vessel Register, usually followed by scrapping or other final disposal

== Ships in class ==
Construction data
Ship name	Hull no.	Builder	Laid down	Launched	Comm./Recomm.	Decomm.	Fate
Gato	SS-212	Electric Boat Company, Groton, Connecticut	5 Oct 1940	21 Aug 1941	31 Dec 1941	16 Mar 1946	PT 1952-1960; struck 1 Mar 1960, sold for scrap
Gato	SS-212	Electric Boat Company, Groton, Connecticut	5 Oct 1940	21 Aug 1941	1952	1 Mar 1960	PT 1952-1960; struck 1 Mar 1960, sold for scrap
Greenling	SS-213	Electric Boat Company, Groton, Connecticut	12 Nov 1940	20 Sep 1941	21 Jan 1942	16 Oct 1946	PT 1946-1960; struck 1 Mar 1960, sold for scrap
Greenling	SS-213	Electric Boat Company, Groton, Connecticut	12 Nov 1940	20 Sep 1941	December 1946	1 Mar 1960	PT 1946-1960; struck 1 Mar 1960, sold for scrap
Grouper	SS-214	Electric Boat Company, Groton, Connecticut	28 Dec 1940	27 Oct 1941	12 Feb 1942	2 Dec 1968	SSK Jan 1951; AGSS 21 Jun 1958; struck 2 Dec 1968, sold for scrap
Growler	SS-215	Electric Boat Company, Groton, Connecticut	10 Feb 1941	22 Nov 1941	20 Mar 1942	—N/a	Lost to Japanese surface attack, 8 Nov 1944
Grunion	SS-216	Electric Boat Company, Groton, Connecticut	1 Mar 1941	22 Dec 1941	11 Apr 1942	—N/a	Lost due likely to circular run of own torpedo, 30 Jul 1942
Guardfish	SS-217	Electric Boat Company, Groton, Connecticut	1 Apr 1941	20 Jan 1942	8 May 1942	25 May 1946	PT 1948-1960; struck 1 Jun 1960, sold for scrap
Guardfish	SS-217	Electric Boat Company, Groton, Connecticut	1 Apr 1941	20 Jan 1942	18 Jun 1948	1 Jun 1960	PT 1948-1960; struck 1 Jun 1960, sold for scrap
Albacore	SS-218	Electric Boat Company, Groton, Connecticut	21 Apr 1941	17 Feb 1942	1 Jun 1942	—N/a	Lost to Japanese mine, 7 Nov 1944
Amberjack	SS-219	Electric Boat Company, Groton, Connecticut	15 May 1941	6 Mar 1942	19 Jun 1942	—N/a	Lost, possibly to Japanese surface attack, 16 Feb 1943
Barb	SS-220	Electric Boat Company, Groton, Connecticut	7 Jun 1941	2 Apr 1942	8 Jul 1942	12 Feb 1947	G IB 1954, transferred to Italy as Enrico Tazzoli 1954; returned to US and sold for scrap 15 Oct 1972
Barb	SS-220	Electric Boat Company, Groton, Connecticut	7 Jun 1941	2 Apr 1942	3 Dec 1951	5 Feb 1954	G IB 1954, transferred to Italy as Enrico Tazzoli 1954; returned to US and sold for scrap 15 Oct 1972
Barb	SS-220	Electric Boat Company, Groton, Connecticut	7 Jun 1941	2 Apr 1942	3 Aug 1954	13 Dec 1954	G IB 1954, transferred to Italy as Enrico Tazzoli 1954; returned to US and sold for scrap 15 Oct 1972
Blackfish	SS-221	Electric Boat Company, Groton, Connecticut	1 Jul 1941	18 Apr 1942	22 Jul 1942	11 May 1946	PT 1949-1954; struck 1 Sep 1958, sold for scrap
Blackfish	SS-221	Electric Boat Company, Groton, Connecticut	1 Jul 1941	18 Apr 1942	5 May 1949	19 May 1954	PT 1949-1954; struck 1 Sep 1958, sold for scrap
Bluefish	SS-222	Electric Boat Company, Groton, Connecticut	5 Jun 1942	21 Feb 1943	24 May 1943	12 Feb 1947	Struck 1 Sep 1958, sold for scrap 4 May 1959
Bluefish	SS-222	Electric Boat Company, Groton, Connecticut	5 Jun 1942	21 Feb 1943	7 Jan 1952	20 Nov 1953	Struck 1 Sep 1958, sold for scrap 4 May 1959
Bonefish	SS-223	Electric Boat Company, Groton, Connecticut	25 Jun 1942	7 Mar 1943	31 May 1943	—N/a	Lost to Japanese surface attack, 18 Jun 1945
Cod	SS-224	Electric Boat Company, Groton, Connecticut	21 Jul 1942	21 Mar 1943	21 Jun 1943	22 Jun 1946	PT 1960-1971, AGSS 1 Dec 1962, IXSS 30 Jun 1971, struck 15 Dec 1971. Museum ship currently moored in Cleveland, Ohio's North Coast Harbor at the USS Cod Submarine Memorial since 1 May 1976.
Cod	SS-224	Electric Boat Company, Groton, Connecticut	21 Jul 1942	21 Mar 1943	1 May 1960	15 Dec 1971	PT 1960-1971, AGSS 1 Dec 1962, IXSS 30 Jun 1971, struck 15 Dec 1971. Museum ship currently moored in Cleveland, Ohio's North Coast Harbor at the USS Cod Submarine Memorial since 1 May 1976.
Cero	SS-225	Electric Boat Company, Groton, Connecticut	24 Aug 1942	4 Apr 1943	4 Jul 1943	8 Jun 1946	PT 1959-1967; struck 30 Jun 1967, sold for scrap October 1970
Cero	SS-225	Electric Boat Company, Groton, Connecticut	24 Aug 1942	4 Apr 1943	4 Feb 1952	23 Dec 1953	PT 1959-1967; struck 30 Jun 1967, sold for scrap October 1970
Cero	SS-225	Electric Boat Company, Groton, Connecticut	24 Aug 1942	4 Apr 1943	12 Sep 1959	30 Jun 1967	PT 1959-1967; struck 30 Jun 1967, sold for scrap October 1970
Corvina	SS-226	Electric Boat Company, Groton, Connecticut	21 Sep 1942	9 May 1943	6 Aug 1943	—N/a	Lost to Japanese submarine attack, 16 Nov 1943
Darter	SS-227	Electric Boat Company, Groton, Connecticut	20 Oct 1942	6 Jun 1943	7 Sep 1943	—N/a	Lost to accidental grounding, 24 Oct 1944
Drum	SS-228	Portsmouth Naval Shipyard, Kittery, Maine	11 Sep 1940	12 May 1941	1 Nov 1941	16 Feb 1946	PT 1947-1968, AGSS 1 Dec 1962; struck 30 Jun 1968, memorial in Mobile, Alabama
Drum	SS-228	Portsmouth Naval Shipyard, Kittery, Maine	11 Sep 1940	12 May 1941	18 Mar 1947	30 Jun 1968	PT 1947-1968, AGSS 1 Dec 1962; struck 30 Jun 1968, memorial in Mobile, Alabama
Flying Fish	SS-229	Portsmouth Naval Shipyard, Kittery, Maine	6 Dec 1940	9 Jul 1941	10 Dec 1941	28 May 1954	AGSS 29 Nov 1950; struck 1 Aug 1958, sold for scrap 1 May 1959
Finback	SS-230	Portsmouth Naval Shipyard, Kittery, Maine	5 Feb 1941	25 Aug 1941	31 Jan 1942	21 Apr 1950	Struck 1 Sep 1958, sold for scrap 15 Jul 1959
Haddock	SS-231	Portsmouth Naval Shipyard, Kittery, Maine	31 Mar 1941	20 Oct 1941	14 Mar 1942	12 Feb 1947	PT 1948-1952, 1956-1960; struck 1 Jun 1960, sold for scrap 23 Aug 1960
Haddock	SS-231	Portsmouth Naval Shipyard, Kittery, Maine	31 Mar 1941	20 Oct 1941	August 1948	May 1952	PT 1948-1952, 1956-1960; struck 1 Jun 1960, sold for scrap 23 Aug 1960
Haddock	SS-231	Portsmouth Naval Shipyard, Kittery, Maine	31 Mar 1941	20 Oct 1941	June 1956	1 Jun 1960	PT 1948-1952, 1956-1960; struck 1 Jun 1960, sold for scrap 23 Aug 1960
Halibut	SS-232	Portsmouth Naval Shipyard, Kittery, Maine	16 May 1941	3 Dec 1941	10 Apr 1942	18 Jul 1945	Constructive total loss following Japanese air attack 14 Nov 1944, returned to US but not repaired, struck 8 May 1946, sold for scrap 9 Dec 1946
Herring	SS-233	Portsmouth Naval Shipyard, Kittery, Maine	14 Jul 1941	5 Jan 1942	4 May 1942	—N/a	Lost to Japanese shore batteries, 1 Jun 1944
Kingfish	SS-234	Portsmouth Naval Shipyard, Kittery, Maine	29 Aug 1941	2 Mar 1942	20 May 1942	9 Mar 1946	PT 1947-1960; struck 1 Mar 1960, sold for scrap 6 Oct 1960
Kingfish	SS-234	Portsmouth Naval Shipyard, Kittery, Maine	29 Aug 1941	2 Mar 1942	6 Oct 1947	1 Mar 1960	PT 1947-1960; struck 1 Mar 1960, sold for scrap 6 Oct 1960
Shad	SS-235	Portsmouth Naval Shipyard, Kittery, Maine	24 Oct 1941	15 Apr 1942	12 Jun 1942	24 Apr 1946	PT 1948-1960; struck 1 Apr 1960, sold for scrap 11 Jul 1960
Shad	SS-235	Portsmouth Naval Shipyard, Kittery, Maine	24 Oct 1941	15 Apr 1942	October 1947	1 Apr 1960	PT 1948-1960; struck 1 Apr 1960, sold for scrap 11 Jul 1960
Silversides	SS-236	Mare Island Naval Shipyard, Vallejo, California	4 Nov 1940	26 Aug 1941	15 Dec 1941	17 Apr 1946	PT 1947-1969, AGSS 1 Dec 1962; struck 30 Jun 1969, memorial in Chicago, Illinois 1973-1987, memorial in Muskegon, Michigan 1987-present
Silversides	SS-236	Mare Island Naval Shipyard, Vallejo, California	4 Nov 1940	26 Aug 1941	15 Oct 1947	30 Jun 1969	PT 1947-1969, AGSS 1 Dec 1962; struck 30 Jun 1969, memorial in Chicago, Illinois 1973-1987, memorial in Muskegon, Michigan 1987-present
Trigger	SS-237	Mare Island Naval Shipyard, Vallejo, California	1 Feb 1941	22 Oct 1941	31 Jan 1942	—N/a	Lost to Japanese surface attack, 28 Mar 1945
Wahoo	SS-238	Mare Island Naval Shipyard, Vallejo, California	28 Jun 1941	14 Feb 1942	15 May 1942	—N/a	Lost to Japanese air attack, 11 Oct 1943
Whale	SS-239	Mare Island Naval Shipyard, Vallejo, California	28 Jun 1941	14 Mar 1942	1 Jun 1942	1 Jun 1946	PT 1957-1960; struck 1 Mar 1960, sold for scrap 14 Oct 1960
Whale	SS-239	Mare Island Naval Shipyard, Vallejo, California	28 Jun 1941	14 Mar 1942	22 Jan 1957	1 Mar 1960	PT 1957-1960; struck 1 Mar 1960, sold for scrap 14 Oct 1960
Angler	SS-240	Electric Boat Company, Groton, Connecticut	9 Nov 1942	4 Jul 1943	1 Oct 1943	2 Feb 1947	SSK 18 Feb 1953, SS 15 Aug 1959, AGSS 1 Jul 1963, IXSS 30 Jun 1971, PT 1968-1971; struck 15 Dec 1971, sold for scrap 1 Feb 1974
Angler	SS-240	Electric Boat Company, Groton, Connecticut	9 Nov 1942	4 Jul 1943	2 Apr 1951	10 Nov 1952	SSK 18 Feb 1953, SS 15 Aug 1959, AGSS 1 Jul 1963, IXSS 30 Jun 1971, PT 1968-1971; struck 15 Dec 1971, sold for scrap 1 Feb 1974
Angler	SS-240	Electric Boat Company, Groton, Connecticut	9 Nov 1942	4 Jul 1943	10 Sep 1953	1 Apr 1968	SSK 18 Feb 1953, SS 15 Aug 1959, AGSS 1 Jul 1963, IXSS 30 Jun 1971, PT 1968-1971; struck 15 Dec 1971, sold for scrap 1 Feb 1974
Angler	SS-240	Electric Boat Company, Groton, Connecticut	9 Nov 1942	4 Jul 1943	1 Apr 1968	15 Dec 1971	SSK 18 Feb 1953, SS 15 Aug 1959, AGSS 1 Jul 1963, IXSS 30 Jun 1971, PT 1968-1971; struck 15 Dec 1971, sold for scrap 1 Feb 1974
Bashaw	SS-241	Electric Boat Company, Groton, Connecticut	4 Dec 1942	25 Jul 1943	25 Oct 1943	29 Jun 1949	SSK 18 Feb 1953, SS 15 Aug 1959, AGSS 1 Sep 1962; struck 13 Sep 1969, sold for scrap 4 Aug 1972 (some sources state sunk as target)
Bashaw	SS-241	Electric Boat Company, Groton, Connecticut	4 Dec 1942	25 Jul 1943	3 Apr 1951	10 May 1952	SSK 18 Feb 1953, SS 15 Aug 1959, AGSS 1 Sep 1962; struck 13 Sep 1969, sold for scrap 4 Aug 1972 (some sources state sunk as target)
Bashaw	SS-241	Electric Boat Company, Groton, Connecticut	4 Dec 1942	25 Jul 1943	28 Mar 1953	13 Sep 1969	SSK 18 Feb 1953, SS 15 Aug 1959, AGSS 1 Sep 1962; struck 13 Sep 1969, sold for scrap 4 Aug 1972 (some sources state sunk as target)
Bluegill	SS-242	Electric Boat Company, Groton, Connecticut	7 Dec 1942	8 Aug 1943	11 Nov 1943	1 Mar 1946	SSK 18 Feb 1953, SS 15 Aug 1959, AGSS 1 Apr 1966; struck 28 Jun 1969, scuttled off Hawaii 3 Dec 1970, wreck used for salvage training, towed to deep water and sunk with honors 6 Nov 1983
Bluegill	SS-242	Electric Boat Company, Groton, Connecticut	7 Dec 1942	8 Aug 1943	3 May 1951	7 Jul 1952	SSK 18 Feb 1953, SS 15 Aug 1959, AGSS 1 Apr 1966; struck 28 Jun 1969, scuttled off Hawaii 3 Dec 1970, wreck used for salvage training, towed to deep water and sunk with honors 6 Nov 1983
Bluegill	SS-242	Electric Boat Company, Groton, Connecticut	7 Dec 1942	8 Aug 1943	2 May 1953	28 Jun 1969	SSK 18 Feb 1953, SS 15 Aug 1959, AGSS 1 Apr 1966; struck 28 Jun 1969, scuttled off Hawaii 3 Dec 1970, wreck used for salvage training, towed to deep water and sunk with honors 6 Nov 1983
Bream	SS-243	Electric Boat Company, Groton, Connecticut	5 Feb 1943	17 Oct 1943	24 Jan 1944	31 Jan 1946	SSK 18 Feb 1953, SS 15 Aug 1959, AGSS 15 Apr 1965; struck 28 Jun 1969, sunk as target 7 Nov 1969
Bream	SS-243	Electric Boat Company, Groton, Connecticut	5 Feb 1943	17 Oct 1943	5 Jun 1951	10 Sep 1952	SSK 18 Feb 1953, SS 15 Aug 1959, AGSS 15 Apr 1965; struck 28 Jun 1969, sunk as target 7 Nov 1969
Bream	SS-243	Electric Boat Company, Groton, Connecticut	5 Feb 1943	17 Oct 1943	20 Jun 1953	28 Jun 1969	SSK 18 Feb 1953, SS 15 Aug 1959, AGSS 15 Apr 1965; struck 28 Jun 1969, sunk as target 7 Nov 1969
Cavalla	SS-244	Electric Boat Company, Groton, Connecticut	4 Mar 1943	14 Nov 1943	29 Feb 1944	16 Mar 1946	SSK 18 Feb 1953, SS 15 Aug 1959, AGSS 1 Jul 1963, PT 1968-1969; struck 30 Dec 1969, memorial in Galveston, Texas
Cavalla	SS-244	Electric Boat Company, Groton, Connecticut	4 Mar 1943	14 Nov 1943	10 Apr 1951	3 Sep 1952	SSK 18 Feb 1953, SS 15 Aug 1959, AGSS 1 Jul 1963, PT 1968-1969; struck 30 Dec 1969, memorial in Galveston, Texas
Cavalla	SS-244	Electric Boat Company, Groton, Connecticut	4 Mar 1943	14 Nov 1943	15 Jul 1953	3 Jun 1968	SSK 18 Feb 1953, SS 15 Aug 1959, AGSS 1 Jul 1963, PT 1968-1969; struck 30 Dec 1969, memorial in Galveston, Texas
Cavalla	SS-244	Electric Boat Company, Groton, Connecticut	4 Mar 1943	14 Nov 1943	3 Jun 1968	30 Dec 1969	SSK 18 Feb 1953, SS 15 Aug 1959, AGSS 1 Jul 1963, PT 1968-1969; struck 30 Dec 1969, memorial in Galveston, Texas
Cobia	SS-245	Electric Boat Company, Groton, Connecticut	17 Mar 1943	28 Nov 1943	29 Mar 1944	22 May 1946	PT 1959-1970, AGSS 1 Dec 1962; struck 1 Jul 1970, memorial in Manitowoc, Wisconsin
Cobia	SS-245	Electric Boat Company, Groton, Connecticut	17 Mar 1943	28 Nov 1943	6 Jul 1951	19 Mar 1954	PT 1959-1970, AGSS 1 Dec 1962; struck 1 Jul 1970, memorial in Manitowoc, Wisconsin
Cobia	SS-245	Electric Boat Company, Groton, Connecticut	17 Mar 1943	28 Nov 1943	12 Sep 1959	1 Jul 1970	PT 1959-1970, AGSS 1 Dec 1962; struck 1 Jul 1970, memorial in Manitowoc, Wisconsin
Croaker	SS-246	Electric Boat Company, Groton, Connecticut	1 Apr 1943	19 Dec 1943	21 Apr 1944	15 Jun 1946	SSK 9 Apr 1953, SS 15 Aug 1959, AGSS 1 May 1967, IXSS 30 Jun 1971, PT 1968-1971; struck 20 Dec 1971, memorial in Groton, CT 1977-1987, memorial in Buffalo, New York 1988-present
Croaker	SS-246	Electric Boat Company, Groton, Connecticut	1 Apr 1943	19 Dec 1943	7 May 1951	18 Mar 1953	SSK 9 Apr 1953, SS 15 Aug 1959, AGSS 1 May 1967, IXSS 30 Jun 1971, PT 1968-1971; struck 20 Dec 1971, memorial in Groton, CT 1977-1987, memorial in Buffalo, New York 1988-present
Croaker	SS-246	Electric Boat Company, Groton, Connecticut	1 Apr 1943	19 Dec 1943	11 Dec 1953	2 Apr 1968	SSK 9 Apr 1953, SS 15 Aug 1959, AGSS 1 May 1967, IXSS 30 Jun 1971, PT 1968-1971; struck 20 Dec 1971, memorial in Groton, CT 1977-1987, memorial in Buffalo, New York 1988-present
Croaker	SS-246	Electric Boat Company, Groton, Connecticut	1 Apr 1943	19 Dec 1943	2 Apr 1968	20 Dec 1971	SSK 9 Apr 1953, SS 15 Aug 1959, AGSS 1 May 1967, IXSS 30 Jun 1971, PT 1968-1971; struck 20 Dec 1971, memorial in Groton, CT 1977-1987, memorial in Buffalo, New York 1988-present
Dace	SS-247	Electric Boat Company, Groton, Connecticut	22 Jul 1942	25 Apr 1943	23 Jul 1943	12 Feb 1947	G IB 1955, transferred to Italy as Leonardo da Vinci 1955; returned to US and sold for scrap 15 Oct 1972
Dace	SS-247	Electric Boat Company, Groton, Connecticut	22 Jul 1942	25 Apr 1943	8 Aug 1951	15 Jan 1954	G IB 1955, transferred to Italy as Leonardo da Vinci 1955; returned to US and sold for scrap 15 Oct 1972
Dace	SS-247	Electric Boat Company, Groton, Connecticut	22 Jul 1942	25 Apr 1943	22 Oct 1954	31 Jan 1955	G IB 1955, transferred to Italy as Leonardo da Vinci 1955; returned to US and sold for scrap 15 Oct 1972
Dorado	SS-248	Electric Boat Company, Groton, Connecticut	27 Aug 1942	23 May 1943	28 Aug 1943	—N/a	Lost, probably to "friendly fire" air attack or German mine off Panama, 12 Oct 1943
Flasher	SS-249	Electric Boat Company, Groton, Connecticut	30 Sep 1942	20 Jun 1943	25 Sep 1943	16 Mar 1946	Struck 1 Jun 1959, sold for scrap 8 Jun 1963, conning tower preserved as memorial in Groton, Connecticut
Flier	SS-250	Electric Boat Company, Groton, Connecticut	30 Oct 1942	11 Jun 1943	18 Oct 1943	—N/a	Lost to Japanese mine, 13 Aug 1944
Flounder	SS-251	Electric Boat Company, Groton, Connecticut	5 Dec 1942	22 Aug 1943	29 Nov 1943	12 Feb 1947	Struck 1 Jun 1959, sold for scrap 2 Feb 1960
Gabilan	SS-252	Electric Boat Company, Groton, Connecticut	5 Jan 1943	19 Sep 1943	28 Dec 1943	23 Feb 1946	Struck 1 Jun 1959, sold for scrap 11 Jan 1960
Gunnel	SS-253	Electric Boat Company, Groton, Connecticut	27 Jul 1941	17 May 1942	20 Aug 1942	18 May 1946	Struck 1 Sep 1958, sold for scrap December 1959
Gurnard	SS-254	Electric Boat Company, Groton, Connecticut	2 Sep 1941	1 Jun 1942	18 Sep 1942	27 Nov 1945	PT 1949-1960; struck 1 May 1961, sold for scrap 29 Oct 1961
Gurnard	SS-254	Electric Boat Company, Groton, Connecticut	2 Sep 1941	1 Jun 1942	April 1949	June 1960	PT 1949-1960; struck 1 May 1961, sold for scrap 29 Oct 1961
Haddo	SS-255	Electric Boat Company, Groton, Connecticut	1 Oct 1941	21 Jun 1942	9 Oct 1942	16 Feb 1946	Struck 1 Aug 1958, sold for scrap 4 May 1959
Hake	SS-256	Electric Boat Company, Groton, Connecticut	1 Nov 1941	17 Jul 1942	30 Oct 1942	13 Jul 1946	PT 1956-1968, AGSS 1 Dec 1962; struck 19 Apr 1968; salvage training hulk in Chesapeake Bay 1968-1972, sold for scrap 5 Dec 1972
Hake	SS-256	Electric Boat Company, Groton, Connecticut	1 Nov 1941	17 Jul 1942	15 Oct 1956	19 Apr 1968	PT 1956-1968, AGSS 1 Dec 1962; struck 19 Apr 1968; salvage training hulk in Chesapeake Bay 1968-1972, sold for scrap 5 Dec 1972
Harder	SS-257	Electric Boat Company, Groton, Connecticut	1 Dec 1941	19 Aug 1942	2 Dec 1942	—N/a	Lost to Japanese surface attack, 24 Aug 1944
Hoe	SS-258	Electric Boat Company, Groton, Connecticut	2 Jan 1942	17 Sep 1942	16 Dec 1942	7 Aug 1946	PT 1956-1960; struck 1 May 1960, sold for scrap 10 Sep 1960
Hoe	SS-258	Electric Boat Company, Groton, Connecticut	2 Jan 1942	17 Sep 1942	September 1956	15 Apr 1960	PT 1956-1960; struck 1 May 1960, sold for scrap 10 Sep 1960
Jack	SS-259	Electric Boat Company, Groton, Connecticut	2 Feb 1942	16 Oct 1942	6 Jan 1943	8 Jun 1946	Snorkel added 1958, transferred to Greece as Amphitriti 1958; returned to US and struck 1 Sep 1967, sunk as target 5 Sep 1967
Jack	SS-259	Electric Boat Company, Groton, Connecticut	2 Feb 1942	16 Oct 1942	20 Dec 1957	21 Apr 1958	Snorkel added 1958, transferred to Greece as Amphitriti 1958; returned to US and struck 1 Sep 1967, sunk as target 5 Sep 1967
Lapon	SS-260	Electric Boat Company, Groton, Connecticut	21 Feb 1942	27 Oct 1942	23 Jan 1943	25 Jul 1946	Snorkel added 1957, transferred to Greece as Poseidon 1957; struck 31 Dec 1975, purchased by Greece for spare parts and sunk as target April 1976
Lapon	SS-260	Electric Boat Company, Groton, Connecticut	21 Feb 1942	27 Oct 1942	13 Apr 1957	10 Aug 1957	Snorkel added 1957, transferred to Greece as Poseidon 1957; struck 31 Dec 1975, purchased by Greece for spare parts and sunk as target April 1976
Mingo	SS-261	Electric Boat Company, Groton, Connecticut	21 Mar 1942	30 Nov 1942	12 Feb 1943	January 1947	Transferred to Japan as Kuroshio 15 Aug 1955; returned to US control 31 Mar 1966, struck and sold to Japan 20 Feb 1971, sunk as target 1973
Mingo	SS-261	Electric Boat Company, Groton, Connecticut	21 Mar 1942	30 Nov 1942	20 May 1955	15 Aug 1955	Transferred to Japan as Kuroshio 15 Aug 1955; returned to US control 31 Mar 1966, struck and sold to Japan 20 Feb 1971, sunk as target 1973
Muskallunge	SS-262	Electric Boat Company, Groton, Connecticut	7 Apr 1942	13 Dec 1942	15 Mar 1943	29 Jan 1947	Transferred to Brazil as Humaitá 18 Jan 1957; struck 1 Dec 1967, returned to US March 1968, sunk as target 9 Jul 1968
Muskallunge	SS-262	Electric Boat Company, Groton, Connecticut	7 Apr 1942	13 Dec 1942	31 Aug 1956	18 Jan 1957	Transferred to Brazil as Humaitá 18 Jan 1957; struck 1 Dec 1967, returned to US March 1968, sunk as target 9 Jul 1968
Paddle	SS-263	Electric Boat Company, Groton, Connecticut	1 May 1942	30 Dec 1942	29 Mar 1943	1 Feb 1946	Transferred to Brazil as Riachuelo 18 Jan 1957; returned to US control March 1968, struck 30 Jun 1968, used for spare parts by Brazil (one source says sunk (sic) about 30 Jun 1968)
Paddle	SS-263	Electric Boat Company, Groton, Connecticut	1 May 1942	30 Dec 1942	31 Aug 1956	18 Jan 1957	Transferred to Brazil as Riachuelo 18 Jan 1957; returned to US control March 1968, struck 30 Jun 1968, used for spare parts by Brazil (one source says sunk (sic) about 30 Jun 1968)
Pargo	SS-264	Electric Boat Company, Groton, Connecticut	21 May 1942	24 Jan 1943	26 Apr 1943	12 Jun 1946	PT 1946-1960; struck 1 Dec 1960, sold for scrap 16 May 1961
Pargo	SS-264	Electric Boat Company, Groton, Connecticut	21 May 1942	24 Jan 1943	12 Jun 1946	1 Dec 1960	PT 1946-1960; struck 1 Dec 1960, sold for scrap 16 May 1961
Peto	SS-265	Manitowoc Shipbuilding Company, Manitowoc, Wisconsin	15 Jun 1941	30 Apr 1942	21 Nov 1942	25 Dec 1942	Peto and Pogy (only) administratively decommissioned during barge delivery via Mississippi River, PT 1956-1960; struck 1 Aug 1960, sold for scrap 29 Nov 1960
Peto	SS-265	Manitowoc Shipbuilding Company, Manitowoc, Wisconsin	15 Jun 1941	30 Apr 1942	January 1943	25 Jun 1946	Peto and Pogy (only) administratively decommissioned during barge delivery via Mississippi River, PT 1956-1960; struck 1 Aug 1960, sold for scrap 29 Nov 1960
Peto	SS-265	Manitowoc Shipbuilding Company, Manitowoc, Wisconsin	15 Jun 1941	30 Apr 1942	November 1956	1 Aug 1960	Peto and Pogy (only) administratively decommissioned during barge delivery via Mississippi River, PT 1956-1960; struck 1 Aug 1960, sold for scrap 29 Nov 1960
Pogy	SS-266	Manitowoc Shipbuilding Company, Manitowoc, Wisconsin	15 Sep 1941	23 Jun 1942	10 Jan 1943	1 Feb 1943	Peto and Pogy (only) administratively decommissioned during barge delivery via Mississippi River; struck 1 Sep 1958, sold for scrap 1 May 1959
Pogy	SS-266	Manitowoc Shipbuilding Company, Manitowoc, Wisconsin	15 Sep 1941	23 Jun 1942	12 Feb 1943	30 Jul 1946	Peto and Pogy (only) administratively decommissioned during barge delivery via Mississippi River; struck 1 Sep 1958, sold for scrap 1 May 1959
Pompon	SS-267	Manitowoc Shipbuilding Company, Manitowoc, Wisconsin	26 Nov 1941	15 Aug 1942	17 Mar 1943	11 May 1946	SSR 11 Dec 1951; struck 1 Apr 1960, sold for scrap 22 Dec 1960
Pompon	SS-267	Manitowoc Shipbuilding Company, Manitowoc, Wisconsin	26 Nov 1941	15 Aug 1942	15 Jun 1953	1 Apr 1960	SSR 11 Dec 1951; struck 1 Apr 1960, sold for scrap 22 Dec 1960
Puffer	SS-268	Manitowoc Shipbuilding Company, Manitowoc, Wisconsin	16 Feb 1942	22 Nov 1942	27 Apr 1943	28 Jun 1946	PT 1946-1960; struck 1 Jul 1960, sold for scrap 3 Dec 1960
Puffer	SS-268	Manitowoc Shipbuilding Company, Manitowoc, Wisconsin	16 Feb 1942	22 Nov 1942	1946	10 Jun 1960	PT 1946-1960; struck 1 Jul 1960, sold for scrap 3 Dec 1960
Rasher	SS-269	Manitowoc Shipbuilding Company, Manitowoc, Wisconsin	4 May 1942	20 Dec 1942	8 Jun 1943	22 Jun 1946	SSR 11 Dec 1951, AGSS 1 Jul 1960, IXSS 30 Jun 1971, PT 1967-1971; struck 20 Dec 1971, sold for scrap 7 Aug 1974
Rasher	SS-269	Manitowoc Shipbuilding Company, Manitowoc, Wisconsin	4 May 1942	20 Dec 1942	14 Dec 1951	28 May 1952	SSR 11 Dec 1951, AGSS 1 Jul 1960, IXSS 30 Jun 1971, PT 1967-1971; struck 20 Dec 1971, sold for scrap 7 Aug 1974
Rasher	SS-269	Manitowoc Shipbuilding Company, Manitowoc, Wisconsin	4 May 1942	20 Dec 1942	22 Jul 1953	27 May 1967	SSR 11 Dec 1951, AGSS 1 Jul 1960, IXSS 30 Jun 1971, PT 1967-1971; struck 20 Dec 1971, sold for scrap 7 Aug 1974
Raton	SS-270	Manitowoc Shipbuilding Company, Manitowoc, Wisconsin	29 May 1942	24 Jan 1943	13 Jul 1943	11 Mar 1949	SSR 18 Jul 1952, AGSS 1 Jul 1960; struck 28 Jun 1969, sold for scrap 12 Oct 1973, hulk reportedly used as target
Raton	SS-270	Manitowoc Shipbuilding Company, Manitowoc, Wisconsin	29 May 1942	24 Jan 1943	21 Sep 1953	28 Jun 1969	SSR 18 Jul 1952, AGSS 1 Jul 1960; struck 28 Jun 1969, sold for scrap 12 Oct 1973, hulk reportedly used as target
Ray	SS-271	Manitowoc Shipbuilding Company, Manitowoc, Wisconsin	20 Jul 1942	28 Feb 1943	27 Jul 1943	12 Feb 1947	SSR 2 Jan 1951; struck 1 Apr 1960, sold for scrap 18 Dec 1960
Ray	SS-271	Manitowoc Shipbuilding Company, Manitowoc, Wisconsin	20 Jul 1942	28 Feb 1943	13 Aug 1952	30 Sep 1958	SSR 2 Jan 1951; struck 1 Apr 1960, sold for scrap 18 Dec 1960
Redfin	SS-272	Manitowoc Shipbuilding Company, Manitowoc, Wisconsin	3 Sep 1942	4 Apr 1943	31 Aug 1943	1 Nov 1946	SSR 2 Jan 1951, SS 15 Aug 1959, AGSS 28 Jun 1963, PT 1967-1970; struck 1 Jul 1970, sold for scrap 31 Mar 1971
Redfin	SS-272	Manitowoc Shipbuilding Company, Manitowoc, Wisconsin	3 Sep 1942	4 Apr 1943	13 Aug 1952	30 Sep 1958	SSR 2 Jan 1951, SS 15 Aug 1959, AGSS 28 Jun 1963, PT 1967-1970; struck 1 Jul 1970, sold for scrap 31 Mar 1971
Robalo	SS-273	Manitowoc Shipbuilding Company, Manitowoc, Wisconsin	24 Oct 1942	9 May 1943	28 Sep 1943	—N/a	Lost to Japanese mine, 26 Jul 1944
Rock	SS-274	Manitowoc Shipbuilding Company, Manitowoc, Wisconsin	23 Dec 1942	20 Jun 1943	26 Oct 1943	1 May 1946	SSR 18 Jul 1952, AGSS 31 Dec 1959; struck 13 Sep 1969, held for use as target, but sold for scrap 18 Sep 1972
Rock	SS-274	Manitowoc Shipbuilding Company, Manitowoc, Wisconsin	23 Dec 1942	20 Jun 1943	12 Oct 1953	13 Sep 1969	SSR 18 Jul 1952, AGSS 31 Dec 1959; struck 13 Sep 1969, held for use as target, but sold for scrap 18 Sep 1972
Runner	SS-275	Portsmouth Naval Shipyard, Kittery, Maine	8 Dec 1941	30 May 1942	30 Jul 1942	—N/a	Lost to unknown cause, possibly Japanese mine, circa 1 Jul 1943
Sawfish	SS-276	Portsmouth Naval Shipyard, Kittery, Maine	20 Jan 1942	23 Jun 1942	26 Aug 1942	20 Jun 1946	PT 1947-1960; struck 1 Apr 1960, sold for scrap 2 Dec 1960
Sawfish	SS-276	Portsmouth Naval Shipyard, Kittery, Maine	20 Jan 1942	23 Jun 1942	15 May 1947	1 Apr 1960	PT 1947-1960; struck 1 Apr 1960, sold for scrap 2 Dec 1960
Scamp	SS-277	Portsmouth Naval Shipyard, Kittery, Maine	6 Mar 1942	20 Jul 1942	18 Sep 1942	—N/a	Lost, probably to Japanese surface and air attack, 11 Nov 1944
Scorpion	SS-278	Portsmouth Naval Shipyard, Kittery, Maine	20 Mar 1942	20 Jul 1942	1 Oct 1942	—N/a	Lost to unknown cause, possibly Japanese mine, circa 5 Jan 1944
Snook	SS-279	Portsmouth Naval Shipyard, Kittery, Maine	17 Apr 1942	15 Aug 1942	24 Oct 1942	—N/a	Lost, possibly to Japanese surface attack circa 12 Apr 1945
Steelhead	SS-280	Portsmouth Naval Shipyard, Kittery, Maine	1 Jun 1942	11 Sep 1942	7 Dec 1942	29 Jun 1946	PT 1947-1960; struck 1 Apr 1960, sold for scrap 21 Dec 1960
Steelhead	SS-280	Portsmouth Naval Shipyard, Kittery, Maine	1 Jun 1942	11 Sep 1942	12 Nov 1947	1 Apr 1960	PT 1947-1960; struck 1 Apr 1960, sold for scrap 21 Dec 1960
Sunfish	SS-281	Mare Island Naval Shipyard, Vallejo, California	25 Sep 1941	2 May 1942	15 Jul 1942	26 Dec 1945	PT 1949-1960; struck 1 May 1960, sold for scrap 15 Dec 1960
Sunfish	SS-281	Mare Island Naval Shipyard, Vallejo, California	25 Sep 1941	2 May 1942	April 1949	1 May 1960	PT 1949-1960; struck 1 May 1960, sold for scrap 15 Dec 1960
Tunny	SS-282	Mare Island Naval Shipyard, Vallejo, California	10 Nov 1941	30 Jun 1942	1 Sep 1942	12 Feb 1946	SSG 18 Jul 1952, SS 15 May 1965, APSS 1 Oct 1966, LPSS 1 Jan 1969; struck 30 Jun 1969, sunk as target 19 Jun 1970
Tunny	SS-282	Mare Island Naval Shipyard, Vallejo, California	10 Nov 1941	30 Jun 1942	25 Feb 1952	30 Apr 1952	SSG 18 Jul 1952, SS 15 May 1965, APSS 1 Oct 1966, LPSS 1 Jan 1969; struck 30 Jun 1969, sunk as target 19 Jun 1970
Tunny	SS-282	Mare Island Naval Shipyard, Vallejo, California	10 Nov 1941	30 Jun 1942	6 Mar 1953	28 Jun 1969	SSG 18 Jul 1952, SS 15 May 1965, APSS 1 Oct 1966, LPSS 1 Jan 1969; struck 30 Jun 1969, sunk as target 19 Jun 1970
Tinosa	SS-283	Mare Island Naval Shipyard, Vallejo, California	21 Feb 1942	7 Oct 1942	15 Jan 1943	23 Jun 1949	Struck 1 Sep 1958, used as ASW target, scuttled November 1960
Tinosa	SS-283	Mare Island Naval Shipyard, Vallejo, California	21 Feb 1942	7 Oct 1942	4 Jan 1952	2 Dec 1953	Struck 1 Sep 1958, used as ASW target, scuttled November 1960
Tullibee	SS-284	Mare Island Naval Shipyard, Vallejo, California	1 Apr 1942	11 Nov 1942	15 Feb 1943	—N/a	Lost due to circular run of own torpedo, 26 Mar 1944
Golet	SS-361	Manitowoc Shipbuilding Company, Manitowoc, Wisconsin	27 Jan 1943	1 Aug 1943	30 Nov 1943	—N/a	Lost to Japanese surface attack, 14 Jun 1944
Guavina	SS-362	Manitowoc Shipbuilding Company, Manitowoc, Wisconsin	3 Mar 1943	29 Aug 1943	23 Dec 1943	8 Jun 1946	SSO 16 Aug 1948, AGSS 11 Dec 1951, AOSS 22 Jun 1957, PT 1960-1967; struck 30 Jun 1967, sunk as target 14 Nov 1967
Guavina	SS-362	Manitowoc Shipbuilding Company, Manitowoc, Wisconsin	3 Mar 1943	29 Aug 1943	1 Feb 1950	27 Mar 1959	SSO 16 Aug 1948, AGSS 11 Dec 1951, AOSS 22 Jun 1957, PT 1960-1967; struck 30 Jun 1967, sunk as target 14 Nov 1967
Guavina	SS-362	Manitowoc Shipbuilding Company, Manitowoc, Wisconsin	3 Mar 1943	29 Aug 1943	February 1960	30 Jun 1967	SSO 16 Aug 1948, AGSS 11 Dec 1951, AOSS 22 Jun 1957, PT 1960-1967; struck 30 Jun 1967, sunk as target 14 Nov 1967
Guitarro	SS-363	Manitowoc Shipbuilding Company, Manitowoc, Wisconsin	7 Apr 1943	26 Sep 1943	26 Jan 1944	6 Dec 1945	Snorkel added 1954, transferred to Turkey as Preveze 7 Aug 1954, struck and sold to Turkey 1 Jan 1972, decommissioned by Turkey 4 May 1972, used as battery charging hulk until scrapped September 1983, sail preserved as memorial at Gölcük Naval Base until earthquake 17 Aug 1999
Guitarro	SS-363	Manitowoc Shipbuilding Company, Manitowoc, Wisconsin	7 Apr 1943	26 Sep 1943	6 Feb 1952	22 Sep 1953	Snorkel added 1954, transferred to Turkey as Preveze 7 Aug 1954, struck and sold to Turkey 1 Jan 1972, decommissioned by Turkey 4 May 1972, used as battery charging hulk until scrapped September 1983, sail preserved as memorial at Gölcük Naval Base until earthquake 17 Aug 1999
Hammerhead	SS-364	Manitowoc Shipbuilding Company, Manitowoc, Wisconsin	5 May 1943	24 Oct 1943	1 Mar 1944	9 Feb 1946	Snorkel added 1954, transferred to Turkey as Cerbe 23 Oct 1954, struck and sold to Turkey 1 Jan 1972, decommissioned by Turkey 4 May 1972, subsequently scrapped
Hammerhead	SS-364	Manitowoc Shipbuilding Company, Manitowoc, Wisconsin	5 May 1943	24 Oct 1943	6 Feb 1952	21 Aug 1953	Snorkel added 1954, transferred to Turkey as Cerbe 23 Oct 1954, struck and sold to Turkey 1 Jan 1972, decommissioned by Turkey 4 May 1972, subsequently scrapped

== See also ==
- List of most successful American submarines in World War II
- List of lost United States submarines
- List of Balao-class submarines
- List of Tench-class submarines
