= USS Walrus (SS-437) =

Submarine of the United States

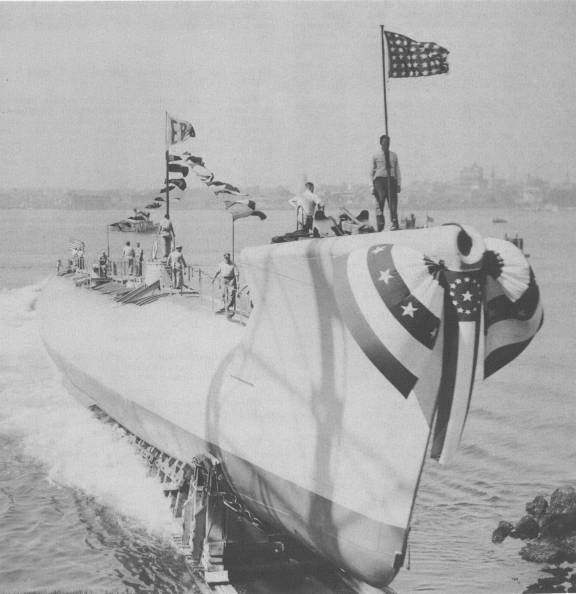
- USS Walrus (SS-437) is launched by the Electric Boat Company at Groton, Connecticut, on 20 September 1946.

History

United States
- Name: USS Walrus
- Namesake: The walrus
- Builder: Electric Boat Company, Groton, Connecticut
- Laid down: 21 June 1945
- Launched: 20 September 1946
- Sponsored by: Miss Winifred P. Nagle
- Completed: Never
- Commissioned: Never
- Stricken: 9 June 1958
- Fate: Construction contract cancelled 7 January 1946; Sold incomplete for scrapping 1958

General characteristics
- Class & type: Tench-class diesel-electric submarine
- Displacement: 1,570 tons (1,595 t) surfaced; 2,416 tons (2,455 t) submerged
- Length: 311 ft 8 in (95.00 m)
- Beam: 27 ft 4 in (8.33 m)
- Draft: 17 ft 0 in (5.18 m) maximum
- Propulsion: 4 × Fairbanks-Morse Model 38D8-⅛ 10-cylinder opposed piston diesel engines driving electrical generators; 2 × 126-cell Sargo batteries; 2 × low-speed direct-drive General Electric electric motors; two propellers; 5,400 shp (4.0 MW) surfaced; 2,740 shp (2.0 MW) submerged
- Speed: 20.25 knots (38 km/h) surfaced; 8.75 knots (16 km/h) submerged
- Range: 11,000 nautical miles (20,000 km) surfaced at 10 knots (19 km/h)
- Endurance: 48 hours at 2 knots (3.7 km/h) submerged; 75 days on patrol
- Test depth: 400 ft (120 m)
- Complement: 10 officers, 71 enlisted
- Armament: 10 × 21-inch (533 mm) torpedo tubes; (6 forward, 4 aft); 28 torpedoes; 1 × 5-inch (127 mm) / 25 caliber deck gun; Bofors 40 mm and Oerlikon 20 mm cannon

USS Walrus (hull number SS-437), a World War II Tench-class submarine, was the third ship of the United States Navy to be named for the walrus, a gregarious, aquatic mammal found in Arctic waters, related to the seal and a prime source of leather, oil, ivory, and food. Like the second USS Walrus (SS-431), she was not completed.

Walrus's keel was laid down on 21 June 1945 by the Electric Boat Company at Groton, Connecticut. Work on the submarine was suspended on 7 January 1946 when the contract for her construction was cancelled, although she was launched on 20 September 1946, sponsored by Miss Winifred P. Nagle.

Walrus's hull was assigned to the Atlantic Reserve Fleet, New London Group of the Atlantic Reserve Fleet on 9 December 1952. Her name was stricken from the Naval Vessel Register on 9 June 1958 and she was sold incomplete for scrapping.
