= Mofu Point =

Location in Hainan, China

Mofu Point lies as the northeast extremity of Hainan at 20 degrees, 1 minute north latitude and 110 degrees, 56 minutes east longitude. It is the site of the wreck of the S.S. Antung in 1933 and was used as a lifeguard station by the submarine USS Tigrone (SS-419) in 1945.
