= USS Unicorn (SS-436) =

Submarine of the United States

History

United States
- Name: USS Unicorn
- Namesake: The narwhal, sometimes called the "sea unicorn"
- Builder: Electric Boat Company, Groton, Connecticut
- Laid down: 25 April 1945
- Launched: 1 August 1946
- Sponsored by: Mrs. William A. Rowan
- Completed: Never
- Commissioned: Never
- Stricken: 29 July 1958
- Fate: Construction contract cancelled 7 January 1946; reinstated 25 February 1946 to allow launch; sold for scrapping 1958

General characteristics
- Class & type: Tench-class diesel-electric submarine
- Displacement: 1,570 tons (1,595 t) surfaced; 2,416 tons (2,455 t) submerged
- Length: 311 ft 8 in (95.00 m)
- Beam: 27 ft 4 in (8.33 m)
- Draft: 17 ft 0 in (5.18 m) maximum
- Propulsion: 4 × Fairbanks-Morse Model 38D8-⅛ 10-cylinder opposed piston diesel engines driving electrical generators; 2 × 126-cell Sargo batteries; 2 × low-speed direct-drive General Electric electric motors; two propellers; 5,400 shp (4.0 MW) surfaced; 2,740 shp (2.0 MW) submerged
- Speed: 20.25 knots (38 km/h) surfaced; 8.75 knots (16 km/h) submerged
- Range: 11,000 nautical miles (20,000 km) surfaced at 10 knots (19 km/h)
- Endurance: 48 hours at 2 knots (3.7 km/h) submerged; 75 days on patrol
- Test depth: 400 ft (120 m)
- Complement: 10 officers, 71 enlisted
- Armament: 10 × 21-inch (533 mm) torpedo tubes; (6 forward, 4 aft); 28 torpedoes; 1 × 5-inch (127 mm) / 25 caliber deck gun; Bofors 40 mm and Oerlikon 20 mm cannon

USS Unicorn (hull number SS-436), a World War II Tench-class submarine, was the second submarine of the United States Navy to be given that name for the narwhal, an Arctic marine cetacean with a single tusk suggesting the horn of a unicorn and sometimes called the "sea unicorn." Like the first USS Unicorn (SS-429), she was not completed.

Unicorn's keel was laid down on 25 April 1945 by the Electric Boat Company of Groton, Connecticut. The contract to build her was cancelled on 7 January 1946; however, it was reinstated on 26 February 1946 for "completion of specific items," and she was launched on 1 August 1946 sponsored by Mrs. William A. Rowan, and accepted by the Navy on 3 September 1946.

Towed to the Portsmouth Naval Shipyard at Kittery, Maine, on 15 September 1946, Unicorn was moved to New London, Connecticut, two months later and assigned to the Atlantic Reserve Fleet, New London. She remained out of commission, in reserve, until 29 July 1958, when she was stricken from the Naval Vessel Register and sold for scrap.
