= USS Tigrone =

Submarine of the United States

Coordinates: 18°40′N 110°40′E

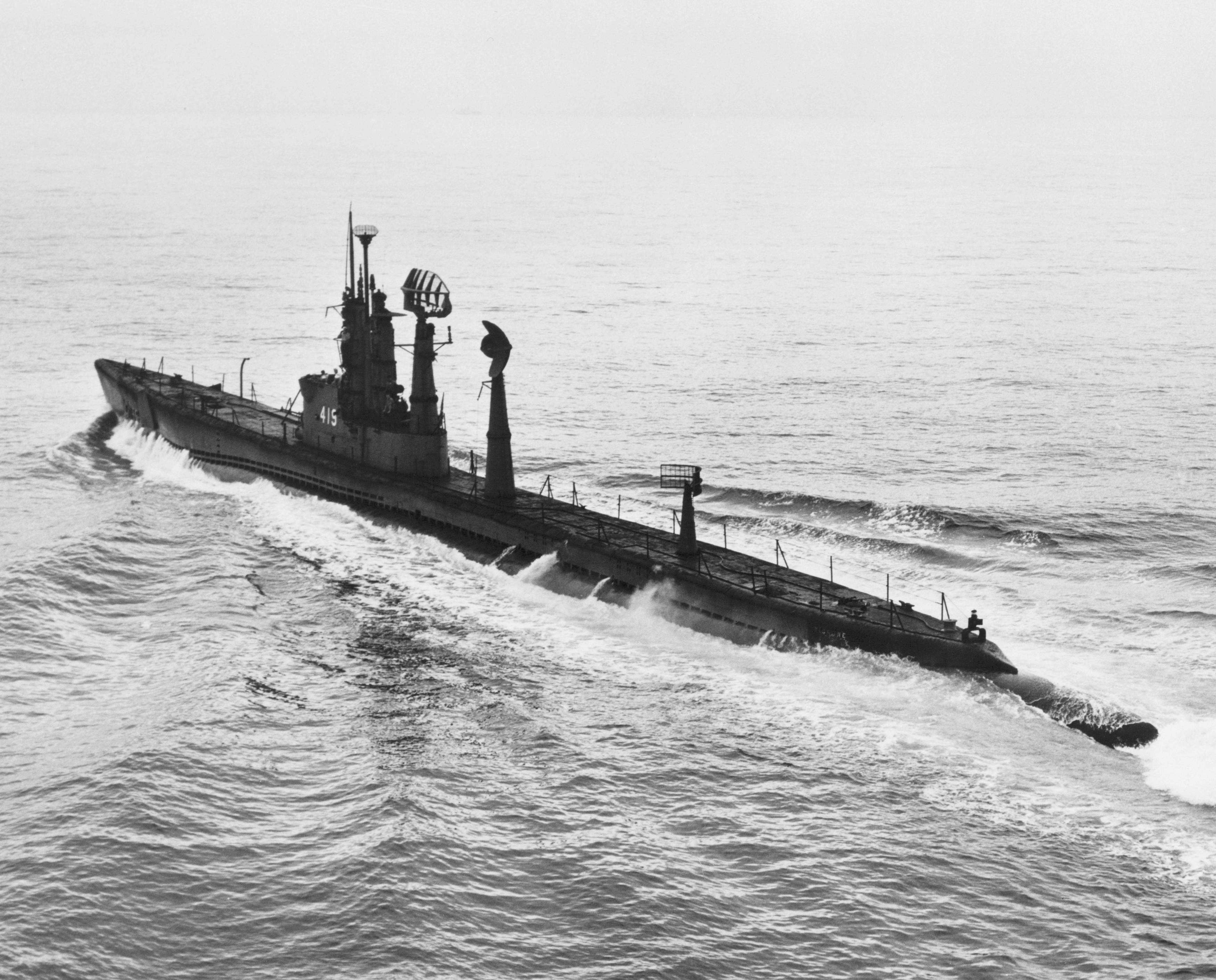
- USS Tigrone (SSR-419) in configuration as a Radar Picket

History

United States
- Name: Tigrone
- Namesake: Tigrone shark
- Builder: Portsmouth Naval Shipyard, Kittery, Maine
- Laid down: 8 May 1944
- Launched: 20 July 1944
- Commissioned: 25 October 1944
- Decommissioned: January 1947
- Recommissioned: July 1948
- Decommissioned: October 1957
- Recommissioned: 10 March 1962
- Decommissioned: 27 June 1975
- Stricken: 27 June 1975
- Nickname(s): Tiger-One
- Fate: Sunk as a target off Cape Hatteras, 25 October 1976

General characteristics
- Class & type: Tench-class diesel-electric submarine
- Displacement: 1,570 tons (1,595 t) surfaced; 2,416 tons (2,456 t) submerged
- Length: 311 ft 8 in (95.00 m)
- Beam: 27 ft 4 in (8.33 m)
- Draft: 17 ft (5.2 m) maximum
- Propulsion: 4 × Fairbanks-Morse Model 38D8-⅛ 10-cylinder opposed piston diesel engines driving electrical generators; 2 × 126-cell Sargo batteries; 2 × low-speed direct-drive General Electric electric motors; two propellers; 5,400 shp (4.0 MW) surfaced; 2,740 shp (2.0 MW) submerged
- Speed: 20.25 knots (38 km/h) surfaced; 8.75 knots (16 km/h) submerged
- Range: 11,000 nautical miles (20,000 km) surfaced at 10 knots (19 km/h)
- Endurance: 48 hours at 2 knots (3.7 km/h) submerged; 75 days on patrol
- Test depth: 400 ft (120 m)
- Complement: 10 officers, 71 enlisted
- Armament: 10 × 21-inch (533 mm) torpedo tubes; (6 forward, 4 aft); 28 torpedoes; 1 × 5-inch (127 mm) / 25 caliber deck gun; Bofors 40 mm and Oerlikon 20 mm cannon

USS Tigrone (hull number SS/SSR/AGSS-419), a Tench-class submarine, was the only ship of the United States Navy to be named for the tigrone, a tiger shark found in tropical waters. Her keel was laid down on 8 May 1944 by the Portsmouth Navy Yard. She was launched on 20 July 1944 sponsored by Mrs. Mary B. Grisham (née Breault), wife of Captain Charles F. Grisham, USN, Superintendent of the Portsmouth, N.H., Navy Yard, and commissioned on 25 October 1944.

Tigrone completed fitting out in mid-November and conducted training out of Portsmouth, New Hampshire, and New London, Connecticut, before departing the Submarine Base at New London on the last day of 1944. After ten days of training at the Fleet Sound School, the new submarine got underway on 16 January. Steaming via the Canal Zone, she paused for a week of training off Panama, then set her course for Hawaii, conducting extensive practice approach exercises with attack transport Riverside en route. On 16 February, she arrived at Pearl Harbor to prepare for her first war patrol.

== First patrol ==
On 9 March, she departed Oahu and steamed westward, arriving at Guam on 19 March. After a three-day pause to repair a main engine, she got underway on 21 March in company with submarines Bullhead and Blackfish, members of a combined attack group, led by her own commanding officer, Commander Hiram Cassedy. Joined by Seahorse, the submarines set their course for the South China Sea where they formed a scouting line in hopes of intercepting Japanese shipping.

Seahorse was mistakenly strafed and bombed by a B-24 Liberator on 24 March. Tigrone’s first brush with the enemy came on 29 March in the South China Sea when she dove to avoid an enemy "Oscar" and, at 60 ft (18 m), felt the jolt of a small explosion over the forward battery compartment, apparently the concussion of a small bomb dropped by the enemy plane. The new submarine emerged from this encounter without damage and continued her patrol of the sea lanes off the China coast.

In the days that followed, she made an unsuccessful attempt to intercept a convoy spotted by American planes. Then, on 3 April, she began lifeguard duties off the eastern shore of Hainan. On 5 April, Tigrone again managed to evade a bomb dropped by a high-flying Japanese plane. On 8 April, she assumed a lifeguard station off Kuannan and began steering five mile (8 km) legs to maintain her station, when the ship's commanding officer noted a wake which he took to be one of the ship's own. Two minutes later, the appearance of a torpedo 500 yards (500 m) away on the port bow gave startling proof that the wake was that of an enemy submarine. As Tigrone swung left, the torpedo passed her abeam, less than 60 yards (50 m) away. She then submerged and rigged for silent running, remaining below for over two hours.

On 9 April, she took up a lifeguard station off Mofu Point and continued patrols off Hainan until 15 April when she departed the area late in the day. She bombarded Pratas Reef near Pratas Island with five-inch (127 mm) gunfire on 16 April and joined submarine Rock three days later to fire on targets including towns and docks on Batan Island. She ended her first war patrol at Guam on 24 April 1945.

== Second patrol ==
After refitting by submarine tender Apollo, Tigrone departed Apra Harbor on 19 May, took on torpedoes at Saipan the same day, and on 20 May got underway for her assigned area. On 25 May, she sighted Sofu Gan Island and Tori Shima before taking up her lifeguard station south of Honshū and west of the Nanpō Islands. That same day, she rescued a downed flier from the 19th Fighter Command, Iwo Jima.

Early on the morning of 27 May, Tigrone engaged a Japanese lugger which countered the submarine's five-inch (127 mm) and 40 millimeter fire with machine-gun fire. As Tigrone turned away from the raking fire of the lugger, heavy seas washed over her main deck, knocking three of the submarine's crewmen against the gun and injuring them. Despite intermittent heavy rain, Tigrone finished off the lugger with five-inch (127 mm) fire. The final and telling round caught the lugger dead center, set it afire, and stopped it dead in the water. High seas made boarding a hazardous proposition, so the battered enemy vessel was left to burn, and Tigrone returned to her lifeguard station.

Early on the afternoon of 28 May, the submarine rendezvoused with a Navy bomber which had signaled its distress. The plane ditched 500 yards (500 m) from Tigrone, and the submarine's crew quickly rescued five survivors from the water. In the next two days, Tigrone proved her skill as a lifeguard ship as she responded to frequent calls for aid and rescued 23 men from the Philippine Sea. On the afternoon of 24 May, Tigrone answered a call for assistance from a severely damaged PBY Catalina seaplane which had nosed into a wave on takeoff from a rescue operation. Quickly arriving on the scene, the submarine took on board 16 survivors, the crew and twice-rescued passengers of the disabled seaplane.

Soon the submarine was searching again, this time for survivors of other downed aircraft who had been reported by circling planes to be floating on rafts in Tigrone’s lifeguard area. Night fell before the submarine located the rafts, but, early on 30 May, she surfaced and, despite 30 ft (9 m) waves, resumed the search. Friendly aircraft aided her efforts, and Tigrone’s persistence was rewarded when she at last located seven Army aviators afloat on a raft. These tenacious survivors had been washed overboard several times during the night but had climbed back each time. The heavy seas made rescue difficult and time-consuming, but finally the exhausted aviators were brought safely on board the submarine. Tigrone jauntily sent out the message,

TIGRONE has saved the Air Force and is now returning to Iwo Jima with 28 rescued zoomies

and noted that she had set a new record for lifeguard proficiency.

On 1 June, Tigrone put in at Iwo Jima to disembark her passengers and on the next day, despite continuing radar problems, again got underway, returning to her patrol area on 3 June. Plagued by fog and radar malfunctions, Tigrone at last was forced to request to be assigned to lifeguard duty when a persistent loud scraping noise in the vicinity of her starboard shaft rendered normal submarine patrol and attack functions hazardous, if not impossible.

Operating south of Honshū, Tigrone joined the "Lifeguard League" and on 26 June recovered an aviator who had parachuted from his disabled fighter, rescuing him from the water only six minutes from the time his parachute blossomed. During the two days that followed, she took on rescued aviators from other submarines and set her course for Guam on 28 June. She ended her second war patrol on 3 July at Apra Harbor, having rescued a total of 30 aviators on this war patrol.

== Third patrol ==
Following refitting by submarine tender Proteus, Tigrone departed Guam on 31 July and, after the usual stop at Saipan for torpedoes, arrived on lifeguard station. As the submarine approached within 100 miles (160 km) of Honshū, the news arrived that the Soviet Union had declared war on Japan. Patrolling nearer and nearer Honshū as American planes made strikes on Tokyo and other cities of the Japanese homeland, Tigrone encountered increasing numbers of Japanese search planes.

On 11 August, the first reports of Japan's surrender were received, but, for two more days, Tigrone continued her patrols, approaching within 50 miles (80 km) of the shore of Sagami Wan as she pursued lifeguard duties. On 13 August, with Navy pilots helping to spot targets, she bombarded Mikomoto Island, scoring 11 hits on a radio station and lighthouse tower. The submarine claimed this action as the final bombardment of the war. On 14 August, Tigrone rescued another aviator who had been forced to parachute from his plane and, later in the day, spent an anxious half-hour attempting to evade persistent sonar contacts which turned out to be birds.

On 15 August, she received orders to cease all attacks; and, the next day, the official statement of Japan's surrender was published. She patrolled off the east coast of Japan as far north as Sendai and Todo Saki. Then, on 30 August, she rendezvoused with "Benny's Peacemakers" and, on the last day of August, moored in Tokyo Bay. She departed Tokyo on 2 September and made her way via Hawaii and the Canal Zone to New London, arriving there early in October 1945.

== Post-war activities ==
Later that month, she visited Washington, DC, for Navy Day activities and, late in December, reported to the Sixth Fleet at Philadelphia, Pennsylvania, for preservation procedures preparatory to inactivation. She was towed to New London and placed out of commission, in reserve, on 30 March 1946.

On 12 April 1948, her hull classification symbol was changed to SSR-419, radar picket submarine. In June, she was towed from New London to Portsmouth for conversion. She was recommissioned on 1 November 1948 and, early in 1949, conducted shakedown out of Portsmouth in preparation for her new duties as an Arctic radar picket. That summer, she joined Submarine Division 62 operating out of Norfolk to begin activities evaluating new radar equipment and techniques for long range air defense. She continued in this role until 1957, operating in the Atlantic and Caribbean Sea and completing five Mediterranean Sea deployments with both American and NATO forces. On 1 August 1957, her status was changed to in commission, in reserve, and, on 1 November, she was decommissioned. She was assigned to the Atlantic Reserve Fleet and berthed at Philadelphia, Pennsylvania.

Redesignated SS-419 on 3 February 1961, she was recommissioned on 10 March 1962 and underwent overhaul and conversion at the Philadelphia Naval Shipyard before reporting to New London for refresher training on 22 September. On 15 November, she departed New London for four weeks of shakedown out of Puerto Rico, and, on 14 December, she returned to New London to remain there into the new year. From April through August 1963, she operated in the Mediterranean Sea on deployment with the Sixth Fleet. She then returned to New London for local operations and to provide services for the Submarine School. On 1 December 1963, she was redesignated an auxiliary submarine with hull classification symbol AGSS-419. Early in 1964, she was fitted out with an experimental sonar unit. Through the end of 1964, she operated in conjunction with the Naval Underwater Sound Laboratory and the Submarine School, testing and evaluating the new equipment.

In 1965, she underwent a major eight-month overhaul and modification at the Philadelphia Naval Shipyard. Her torpedo tubes were removed, two forward compartments thoroughly sound isolated, and a new experimental sonar system, the Brass III, was installed. Operating as a research and development vessel in cooperation with the United States Underwater Sound Laboratory, she began duties which would fill the remaining years of her long career. Assigned primarily to data collection and sonar and acoustic tests in connection with the Brass program, she operated out of New London, conducting underwater systems tests as well as research in sound propagation.

In 1968, she visited Britain and port on the Norwegian Sea, spent September through December in antisubmarine warfare exercises; and trained reserves. She continued her research assignments, joining with submarine HMS Grampus in the early months of 1972 for a joint American-British oceanographic operation in the eastern Atlantic. She operated occasionally in the Caribbean Sea, taking part in Operation "Springboard" in 1973 and 1974. While moored at the Submarine Base in New London, on 25 October 1974, Tigrone observed the 30th anniversary of her commissioning. Into 1975, she continued research activities off the East Coast, which included a visit to Bermuda in March and operations with air units off Jacksonville and Atlantic City, New Jersey.

On 5 May, she began pre-inactivation procedures and, on 27 June 1975, was decommissioned at the Naval Submarine Base, Groton, Connecticut. At the time of her decommissioning, Tigrone was the oldest submarine in commission in the United States Navy, as well as the last unit of the submarine force still in operation to have taken part in combat action in World War II. Her name was struck from the Naval Vessel Register on that same day, and she was sunk as a target on 25 October 1976.

== Awards ==
- Asiatic-Pacific Campaign Medal with two battle stars
- World War II Victory Medal
- Navy Occupation Medal
- National Defense Service Medal with star
