= USS Pompon =

Submarine of the United States

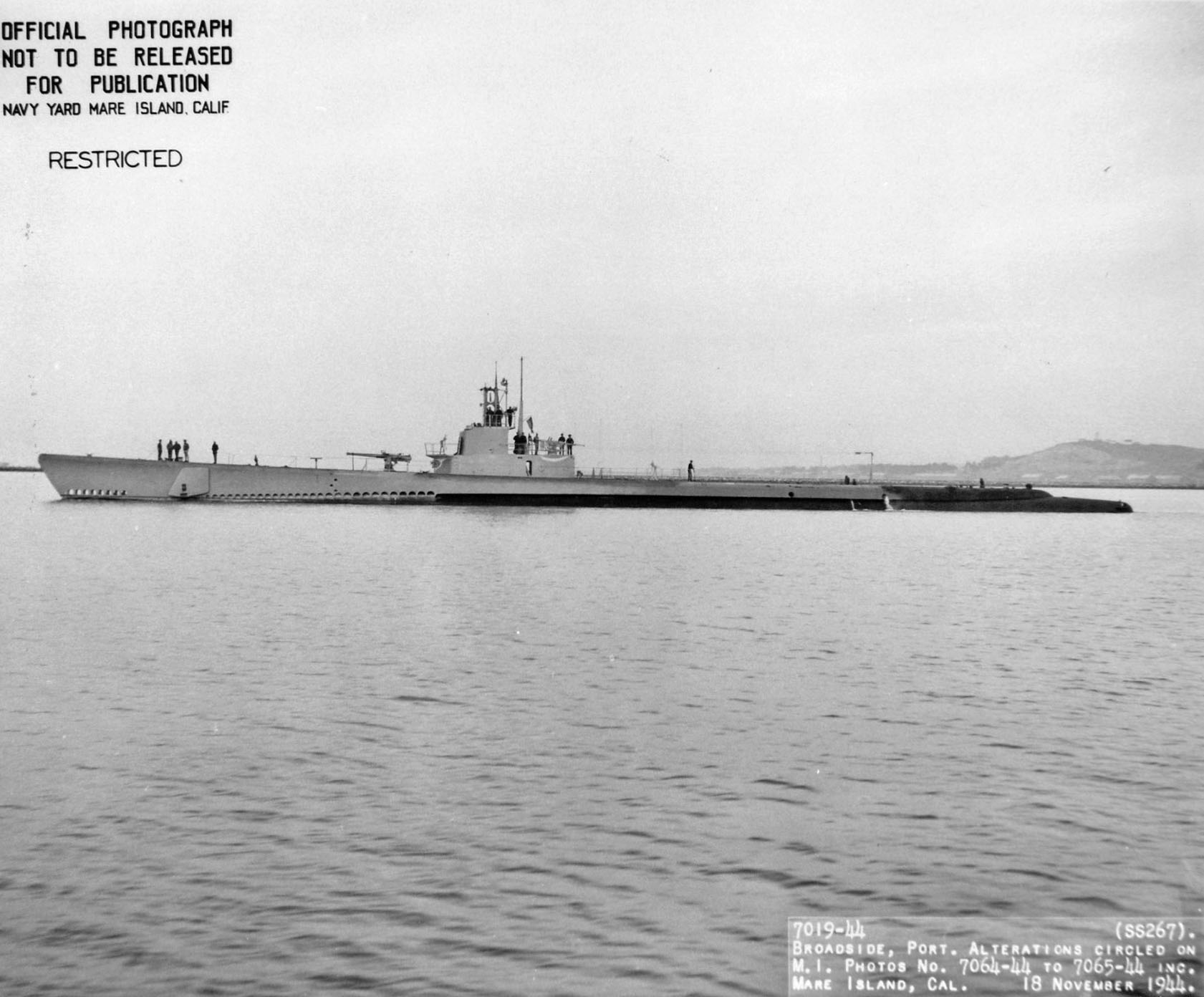

History

United States
- Builder: Manitowoc Shipbuilding Company, Manitowoc, Wisconsin
- Laid down: 26 November 1941
- Launched: 15 August 1942
- Commissioned: 17 March 1943
- Decommissioned: 11 May 1946
- Recommissioned: 15 June 1953
- Decommissioned: 1 April 1960
- Stricken: 1 April 1960
- Fate: Sold for scrap, 22 December 1960

General characteristics
- Class & type: Gato-class diesel-electric submarine
- Displacement: 1,525 long tons (1,549 t) surfaced; 2,424 long tons (2,463 t) submerged
- Length: 311 ft 9 in (95.02 m)
- Beam: 27 ft 3 in (8.31 m)
- Draft: 17 ft 0 in (5.18 m) maximum
- Propulsion: 4 × General Motors Model 16-248 V16 Diesel engines driving electric generators; 2 × 126-cell Sargo batteries; 4 × high-speed General Electric electric motors with reduction gears; two propellers; 5,400 shp (4.0 MW) surfaced; 2,740 shp (2.0 MW) submerged
- Speed: 21 knots (39 km/h) surfaced; 9 knots (17 km/h) submerged
- Range: 11,000 nautical miles (20,000 km) surfaced at 10 knots (19 km/h)
- Endurance: 48 hours at 2 knots (4 km/h) submerged; 75 days on patrol
- Test depth: 300 ft (90 m)
- Complement: 6 officers, 54 enlisted
- Armament: 10 × 21-inch (533 mm) torpedo tubes; 6 forward, 4 aft; 24 torpedoes; 1 × 3-inch (76 mm) / 50 caliber deck gun; Bofors 40 mm and Oerlikon 20 mm cannon

USS Pompon (SS/SSR-267), a Gato-class submarine, was a ship of the United States Navy named for the pompon, an American fish of the Anisot family.

== Construction and commissioning ==
Pompon was laid down by the Manitowoc Shipbuilding Company at Manitowoc, Wisconsin, on 26 November 1941; launched 15 August 1942, sponsored by Miss Katherine Mary Wolleson; and commissioned 17 March 1943.

== Service history ==
On 5 April 1943 Pompon began her voyage down the Mississippi River to New Orleans in a floating drydock. Stores were loaded at New Orleans and she sailed for the Pacific.

=== First war patrol, July – August 1943 ===
Pompon steamed from Brisbane, Australia on 10 July to conduct her first war patrol in the Truk area. Only a few days out, a Japanese submarine fired two torpedoes at her, both passing ahead. Besides patrolling off Truk, Pompon formed a scouting line with other submarines to cover 7th Fleet operations. On 25 July she seized the opportunity and torpedoed 5,871 ton cargo ship Thames Maru. In the same action two more attacks damaged a second transport and also a smaller transport. Numerous patrol boats and another enemy submarine were evaded, and Pompon returned to Brisbane 22 August.

=== Second war patrol, September – November 1943 ===
Pompon departed Brisbane on 12 September 1943 for her second war patrol, en route to a patrol area in the South China Sea north of Singapore. On 16 September, she sighted an Allied Liberty ship in the Coral Sea 25 nautical miles (46 km; 29 mi) east of Grafton Passage in the Great Barrier Reef at 16°35′S 146°45′E at 04:05. The ship altered course directly toward her and she submerged. After Pompon returned to the surface, she unsuccessfully attempted to exchange recognition signals with the ship, which opened gunfire on her at a range of 12,000 yards (11,000 m) at 06:14. Pompon submerged again and suffered no damage.

After reaching her patrol area, Pompon made several unsuccessful attacks and experienced a near miss by a Japanese submarine. She returned to Fremantle, Australia on 5 November 1943 for supplies.

=== Third and fourth war patrols, November 1943 – April 1944 ===
The third patrol began on 29 November and again took her to the China Sea area off French Indo-China. After running Balabac Strait, where two radio-equipped Japanese motor sampans were sunk by gunfire, Pompon mined waters southwest of Cochin China. After a five-day sortie into the Celebes Sea, Pompon returned to Darwin for fuel, ending her patrol on 28 January 1944.

On 22 February, Pompon departed on her fourth patrol, and operated in the vicinity of Halmahera Island. She launched four torpedoes at three small Japanese escort vessels, but they ran under their targets due to the escorts' shallow draft. A contact was made in Roeang Passage, but upon closing, it proved to be a hospital ship. She made no further contacts and proceeded to Pearl Harbor via Ascension and Midway, arriving 10 April.

=== Fifth war patrol, May – June 1944 ===
After a refit and four days training, Pompon was again ready for sea. She departed Pearl Harbor on 6 May 1944 for a patrol off the coasts of Kyūshū, Shikoku, and Honshū. On 30 May she contacted a 742-ton cargo ship off Muroto Zaki. A submerged attack resulted in a hit directly under the rising sun flag amidships, breaking the ship in two. The Shiga Maru immediately sank. For the next seven hours Pompon was the target for five Japanese escorts and a portion of the air force, but she managed to crawl away from the scene at deep submergence. After covering the Tokyo Bay approaches for the Battle for Saipan, Pompon returned to Midway 25 June.

=== Sixth war patrol, July – September 1944 ===
On 19 July Pompon departed on her sixth and most successful patrol. Operating from the eastern coast of Honshū to the Sea of Okhotsk, she sank a 300-ton armed trawler with gunfire. Then on 12 August she spotted a Japanese convoy off the coast of Russian Sakhalin. In the wild night surface action which followed an 8,000-ton tanker was badly damaged by two torpedoes, 2,718-ton transport Mikage Maru No. 20 was sunk, and a hit was possibly obtained on one of two hotly pursuing escort vessels. During this melee Pompon was almost sunk by one of her own torpedoes. While she was surfaced, with the enemy bearing down, one of her own "fish" perversely circled and just missed the stern. She was driven down by gunfire and then depth charged, but managed to escape without damage. She returned to Pearl Harbor 3 September for onward routing to San Francisco Bay for modernization and overhaul conducted at the Mare Island Navy Yard.

=== Seventh war patrol, December 1944 – February 1945 ===
By 13 December the veteran submarine was again at sea. En route to Majuro she picked up a Filipino who had been drifting in a broken down motor launch for 45 days. On 6 January 1945 she departed Majuro as a part of a wolf pack, for a patrol in the Yellow Sea. On 28 January she contacted a three ship convoy with four escorts off Kokuzan To. With Spadefish in contact, the Pompon made two submerged night approaches only to have the alert escorts drive her off each time. While two escorts pinned her down astern of the convoy, Spadefish slipped in on the disengaged side and sank two of the ships and one of the escorts. Pompon surfaced in time to watch the sinkings and gave chase to the one remaining ship. Again she was deterred from attack by gunfire and a trailing escort.

The next morning, while making a morning trim dive, the conning tower hatch failed. Before the dive could be halted the ship had reached a depth of 44 feet (13 m), partially flooding the conning tower and control room, and completely flooding the pump room. Pompon crept homeward, having to run awash until the blower could be partially restored. While struggling along in this condition, she blundered into an enemy convoy and was sighted. The escorts forced her to dive despite her dangerous condition, but she miraculously escaped. Pogy found her one day out of Midway and led her in on 11 February.

=== Eighth and ninth war patrols, March – July 1945 ===
Repairs completed, Pompon departed Midway 30 March for her eighth patrol area along the coasts of China and Formosa. Her only contacts, a motor sampan, a hospital ship, and 106 planes, provided excellent diving experience, but poor hunting. Ten survivors from a downed PBM were taken from Ray for transportation to Guam, where Pompon arrived 24 May.

During her ninth, and last, war patrol from 18 June to 22 July, she operated as a lifeguard in the Truk area. There were no ship contacts and few plane contacts. She was at Guam when the news of the war's end came. On 22 August she began her homeward voyage, arriving at New Orleans on 19 September.

=== Post-war service as radar picket ===
On 11 May 1946 Pompon was decommissioned and placed in the U.S. Atlantic Reserve Fleet, New London. On 15 June 1953 she was recommissioned as SSR-267, after being converted to the latest type radar picket submarine.

After a shakedown cruise to Guantanamo Bay, Cuba, she reported to her new home port at Norfolk, Va. In November she departed for the Mediterranean where she operated with the 6th Fleet until 4 February 1954. In January 1955 she again left the Virginia Capes area, this time for the Caribbean, returning in March. Pompon returned to the Caribbean in February 1956. From 6 July to 3 October she operated in the Mediterranean.

During September and October 1957 Pompon participated in the large scale NATO exercise "Strikeback", visiting the Clyde River, Scotland; Le Havre, France; and Portland, England. She continued to operate in the Atlantic and Caribbean until 17 June 1958 when she entered the Mediterranean, remaining there until September. Returning to Norfolk, she then operated off the east coast until placed in commission in reserve at Charleston 2 February 1959.

== Decommissioning and disposal ==
Following decommissioning Pompon was struck from the Navy List 1 April 1960, and was sold to Commercial Metals Company for scrap on 25 November 1960.

== Honors and awards ==
Pompon earned four battle stars for World War II service.

== Commemoration ==
One of Pompon′s propellers can be seen today on the river walk in Old Town Alexandria, Virginia. It is one block north of the Torpedo Factory Art Center on a concrete slab in the water of the Potomac River.
