= USS Grenadier (SS-525) =

Submarine of the United States

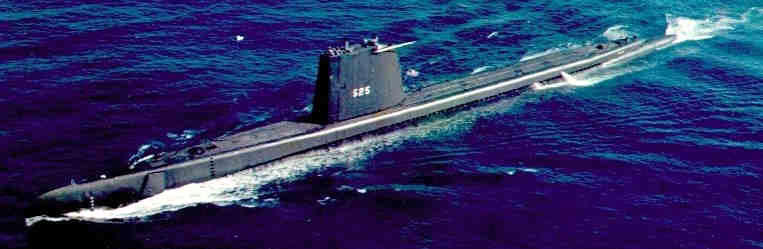
- USS Grenedier SS-525

History

United States
- Builder: Boston Navy Yard
- Laid down: 8 February 1944
- Launched: 15 December 1944
- Commissioned: 10 February 1951
- Decommissioned: 15 May 1973
- Stricken: 15 May 1973
- Fate: Transferred to Venezuela, 15 May 1973

General characteristics (Completed as GUPPY II)
- Class & type: Tench-class diesel-electric submarine
- Displacement: 1,870 tons (1,900 t) surfaced; 2,440 tons (2,480 t) submerged
- Length: 307 ft (94 m)
- Beam: 27 ft 4 in (8.33 m)
- Draft: 17 ft (5.2 m)
- Propulsion: 4 × Fairbanks-Morse Model 38D8-1/8 10-cylinder opposed piston diesel engines, equipped with a snorkel, driving electrical generators; 1 × 184 cell, 1 × 68 cell, and 2 × 126 cell GUPPY-type batteries (total 504 cells); 2 × low-speed direct-drive Westinghouse electric motors; two propellers
- Speed: Surfaced: 18.0 knots (33.3 km/h) maximum; 13.5 knots (25.0 km/h) cruising; Submerged: 16.0 knots (29.6 km/h) for 1/2 hour; 9.0 knots (16.7 km/h) snorkeling; 3.5 knots (6.5 km/h) cruising
- Range: 15,000 nm (28,000 km) surfaced at 11 knots (20 km/h)
- Endurance: 48 hours at 4 knots (7 km/h) submerged
- Test depth: 400 ft (120 m)
- Complement: 9–10 officers; 5 petty officers; 70 enlisted men
- Sensors & processing systems: WFA active sonar; JT passive sonar; Mk 106 torpedo fire control system
- Armament: 10 × 21 inches (530 mm) torpedo tubes; (six forward, four aft)

USS Grenadier (SS-525), a Tench-class submarine, was the second ship of the United States Navy to be named for the grenadier, a soft-finned deep sea fish of the Macrouridae with a long, tapering body and short, pointed tail family, also known as rattails.

== History ==
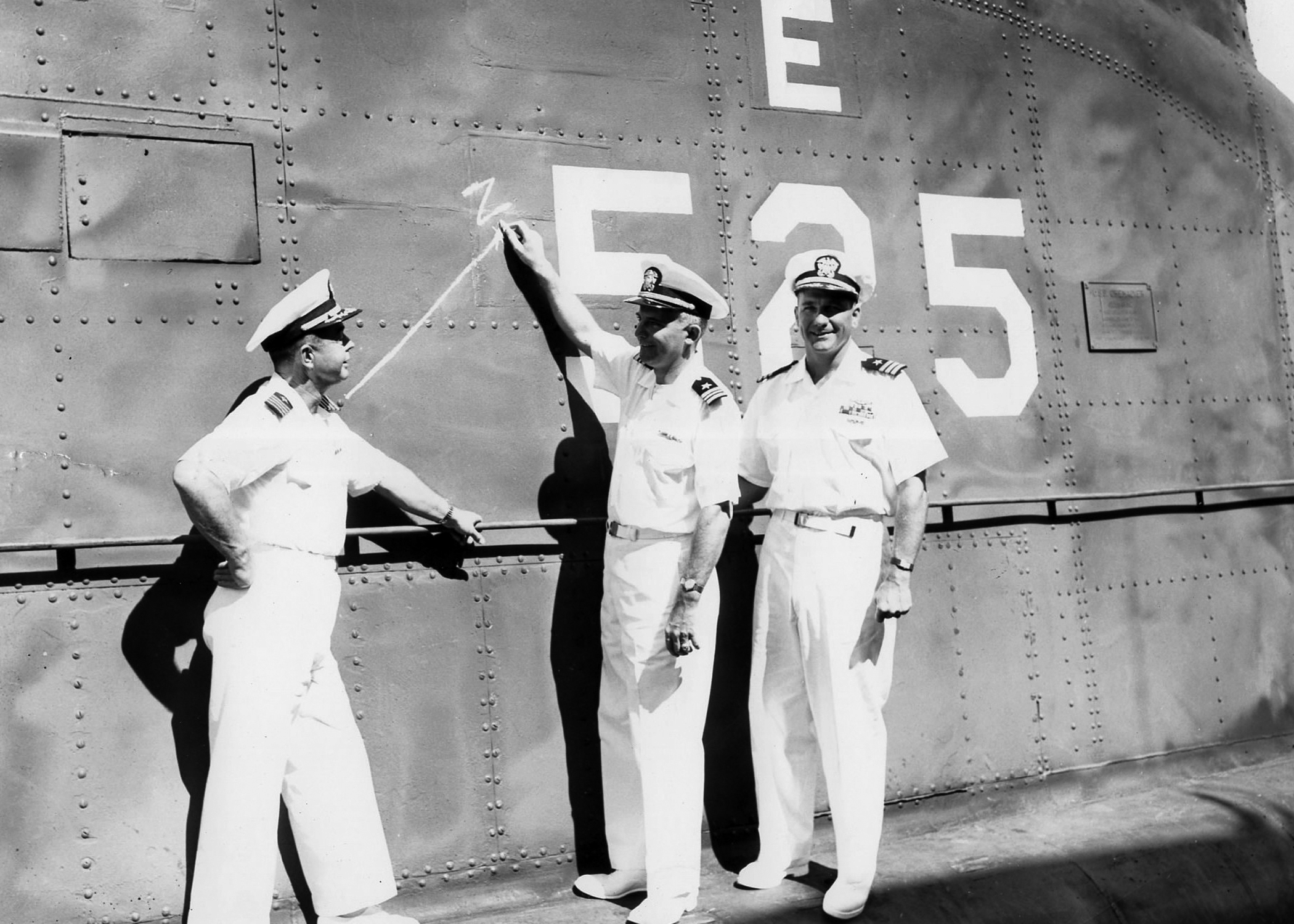
Lt. Cmdr. Ted Davis marks a "Z" on the sail of the submarine USS Grenadier (SS 525) after tracking a Soviet Zulu-class submarine for more than 18 hours, leading to the first documented evidence that the Soviet Union was conducting submarine operations in the Atlantic Ocean

=== Construction ===
The contract to build Grenadier was awarded to the Boston Naval Shipyard, and her keel was laid down on 8 February 1944 in Boston, Massachusetts. She was launched on 15 December 1944 but was not christened until 10 February 1951. The seven year and two day period between keel laying and commissioning is the second longest in history for a United States Navy submarine after USS Pogy (SSN-647). She was sponsored by Mrs. John A. Fitzgerald, wife of the first Grenadier’s last commanding officer, and commissioned the same day with Commander Henry G. Reaves Jr. in command.

=== Early career ===
One of the first Greater Underwater Propulsion Power Program (GUPPY) submarines, Grenadier was equipped with a snorkel to permit indefinite running in an awash condition. Grenadier proved the worth of this device during her shakedown. Returning from the Caribbean Sea cruise, the new submarine made the seven-day voyage from Guantanamo Bay to New London, Connecticut, submerged. Almost two years of intensive training exercises out of New London were capped by her first yard overhaul at Philadelphia, extending from 16 December 1952 to 22 April 1953.

In June 1953 Grenadier participated in the annual midshipman cruise to Rio de Janeiro and other Brazilian ports. Returning to New London via the Caribbean Sea, she then supported ASW exercises during November, as an aircraft carrier task force perfected its antisubmarine operations. Grenadier continued training and battle exercises along the New England coast and off the Virginia Capes and in August 1955 cruised to Montreal, Quebec, via the St. Lawrence River.

Grenadier departed New London 3 January 1956 on the first of several Mediterranean Sea cruises. During a three-month deployment she steamed throughout the Mediterranean and both showed the flag and participated in attack and antisubmarine exercises with various units of the Sixth Fleet. On two subsequent Mediterranean deployments from 8 November 1957 to 27 January 1958, and from 10 April to 8 August 1962 she operated with the Sixth Fleet to bolster peace keeping operations in that troubled region of the world.

Between these cruises, the submarine participated in exercises along the East Coast and was a frequent visitor to Caribbean waters. Grenadier operated out of New London until 15 September 1958, she transferred to Key West, Florida. From there Grenadier served more frequently in the Caribbean, and also patrolled and held exercises along the Atlantic and Gulf of Mexico coasts of Florida.

While on special antisubmarine exercises in the North Atlantic on the morning of 29 May 1959, Grenadier, in company with a patrol plane, sighted and photographed a Soviet submarine prowling the waters off Iceland. It was the first confirmed sighting of a Soviet submarine in the Atlantic.

=== Cuban Missile Crisis ===
Grenadier again confronted Soviet ships when the Cuban Missile Crisis threatened nuclear war in October 1962. In company with Balao (SS-285), Threadfin (SS-410), Trutta (SS-421), and Chopper (SS-342), she formed part of the American fleet that blockaded and quarantined Cuba. After the Soviet offensive missiles were pulled out of Cuba, Grenadier was one of several ships dispatched to Cuba in November to assert and confirm the United States's rights and position there.

=== Later career ===
Grenadier continued patrols and training operations out of Key West. Assigned to SubRon 12, she participated in exercises along the Atlantic coast and in the Caribbean. In addition, she has provided valuable aid during the perfecting of advanced sonar and ASW equipment. She distinguished herself in 1966 gathering navigational data and other information in the Caribbean.

== Fate ==
Grenadier was decommissioned, struck from the Naval Vessel Register and sold to Venezuela on 15 May 1973. Renamed the ARV Picua ("Barracuda"), she served in the Venezuelan Navy until 1990.
