= Atlantic Reserve Fleet, New London =

Former US Navy installation in Connecticut

Coordinates: 41.398115°N 72.086964°W

- Groton, Connecticut

Site information
- Type: Reserve Fleet
- Owner: United States of America
- Controlled by: United States Navy

Site history
- In use: 1946-1965

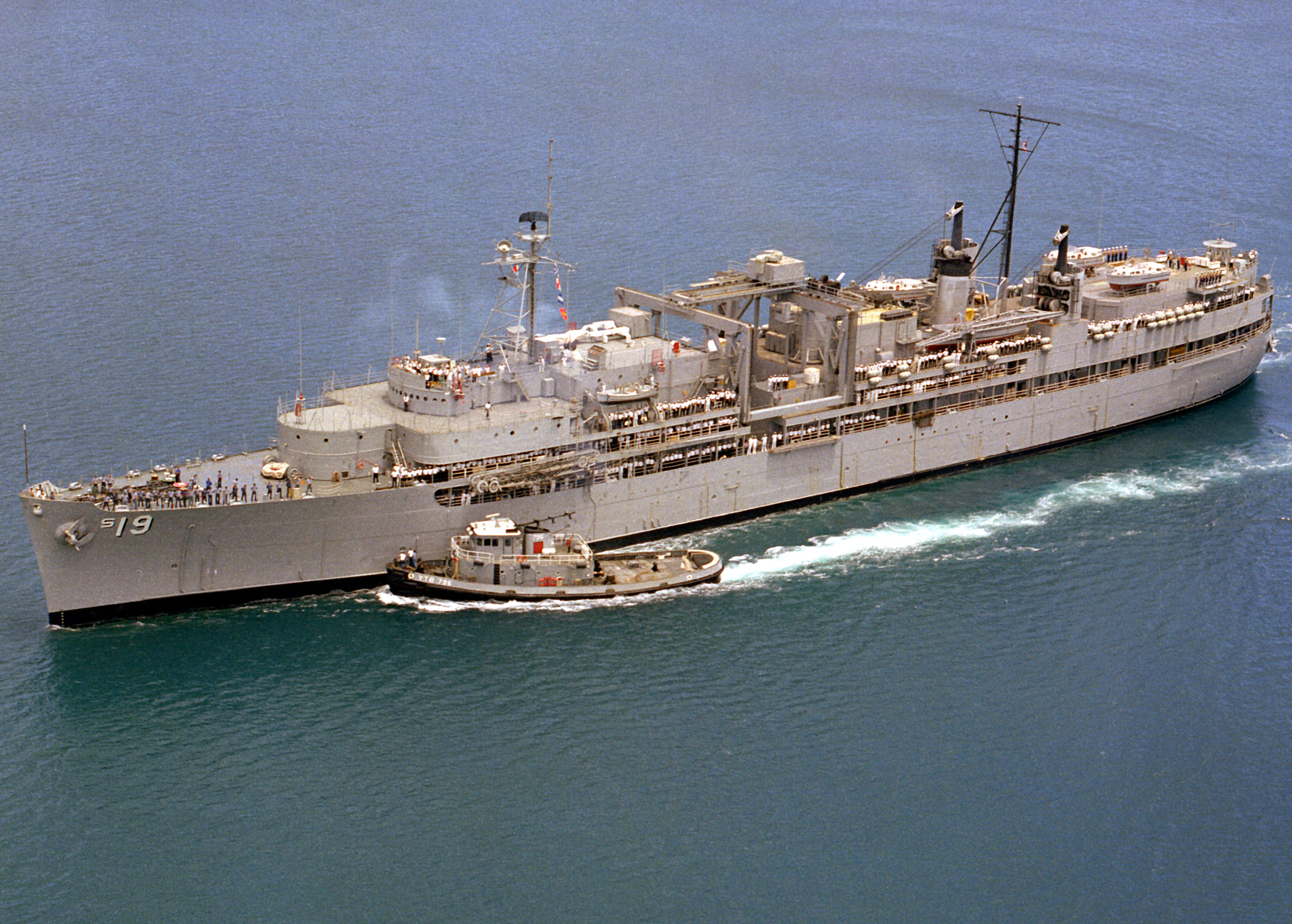
USS Proteus (AS-19) in 1980, post Atlantic Reserve Fleet, New London work

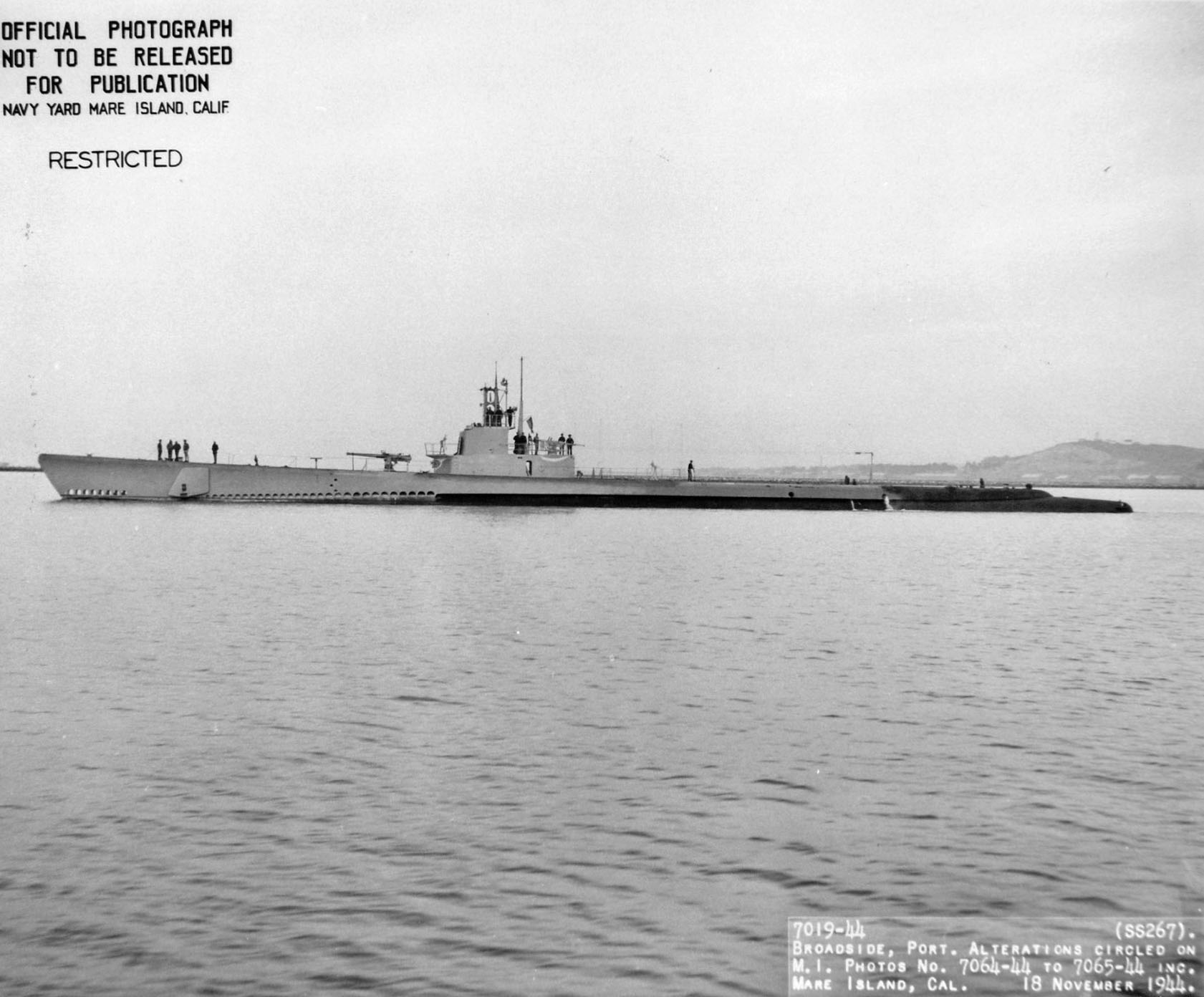
USS Pompon (SS-267) was stored at Atlantic Reserve Fleet, New London from 1946 to 1953

Atlantic Reserve Fleet, New London opened in 1946 at the Naval Submarine Base New London in Groton, Connecticut on the Thames River. The New London Reserve Fleet was 3 miles north of New London, Connecticut. Naval Submarine Base New London opened in 1872 as a Navy yard, received its first submarines on 13 Oct 1915, and earned the designation of Submarine Base around 1916. The freshwater port became a good site to store both submarines and ships after World War II as part of the United States Navy reserve fleets. Three submarine tender ships were tasked with mothballing the submarines. The three ships: USS Apollo, USS Anthedon, USS Proteus (AS-19) cleaned the ships and sealed the subs with preservatives. It took a few years to process the over 50 submarines in the New London Reserve fleet. Some submarines there were reactivated for the Korean War. By 1965, the World War II submarine fleet was obsolete, and the fleet had been scrapped.

The USS Apollo worked at the Reserve Fleet until 1963. The USS Proteus served in the fleet until January 1959, then transferred to the Charleston Naval Shipyard and was converted into a Polaris Fleet Ballistic Missile submarine tender. USS Anthedon served the fleet until 1969, when she was sold to Turkey and became the Turkish Navy TCG Donatan (A-583).

== Examples ==
- USS Pompon a Gato-class submarine, was stored at the Atlantic Reserve Fleet, New London from May 1946 to 1953. In 1953 she was removed from Atlantic Reserve Fleet, New London and recommissioned as SSR-267 a radar picket submarine.
- USS Tigrone (SS-419) was stored at the Atlantic Reserve Fleet, New London from 1946 to 1948. In 1948 she was removed from Atlantic Reserve Fleet, New London and recommissioned as SSR-419, a radar picket submarine.
- USS Jack (SS-259) submarine, was stored at the Atlantic Reserve Fleet, New London from 1946 to 1957. In 1957, she was transferred to the Greece.
- USS Archerfish (SS-311) stored at Atlantic Reserve Fleet, New London from 1955 to 1958.

== See also ==
- Submarine Force Library and Museum
- Naval Submarine Medical Research Laboratory
