= USS Grampus (SS-523) =

Submarine of the United States

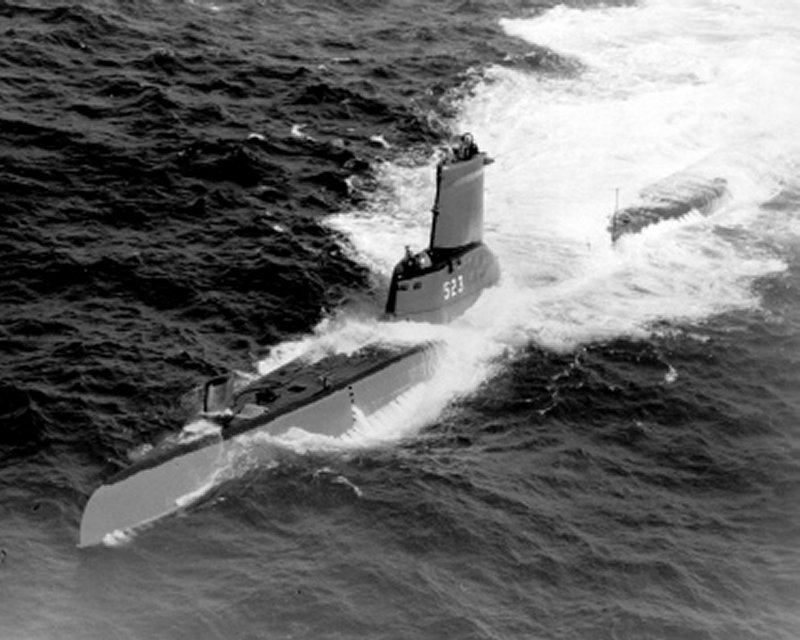

History

United States
- Name: USS Grampus (SS-523)
- Builder: Boston Navy Yard
- Laid down: 8 February 1944
- Launched: 15 December 1944
- Commissioned: 26 October 1949
- Decommissioned: 13 May 1972
- Stricken: 13 May 1972
- Fate: Transferred to Brazil, 13 May 1972

History

Brazil
- Name: Rio Grande do Sul (S-11)
- Acquired: 13 May 1972
- Decommissioned: 16 November 1978
- Fate: Scrapped 1981

General characteristics (Completed as GUPPY II)
- Class & type: Tench-class diesel-electric submarine
- Displacement: 1,870 tons (1,900 t) surfaced; 2,440 tons (2,480 t) submerged
- Length: 307 ft (94 m)
- Beam: 27 ft 4 in (8.33 m)
- Draft: 17 ft (5.2 m)
- Propulsion: 4 × Fairbanks-Morse Model 38D8-1/8 10-cylinder opposed piston diesel engines, equipped with a snorkel, driving electrical generators; 1 × 184 cell, 1 × 68 cell, and 2 × 126 cell GUPPY-type batteries (total 504 cells); 2 × low-speed direct-drive Westinghouse electric motors; two propellers
- Speed: Surfaced: 18.0 knots (33.3 km/h) maximum; 13.5 knots (25.0 km/h) cruising; Submerged: 16.0 knots (29.6 km/h) for 1/2 hour; 9.0 knots (16.7 km/h) snorkeling; 3.5 knots (6.5 km/h) cruising
- Range: 15,000 nm (28,000 km) surfaced at 11 knots (20 km/h)
- Endurance: 48 hours at 4 knots (7 km/h) submerged
- Test depth: 400 ft (120 m)
- Complement: 9–10 officers; 5 petty officers; 70 enlisted men
- Sensors & processing systems: WFA active sonar; JT passive sonar; Mk 106 torpedo fire control system
- Armament: 10 × 21 inches (530 mm) torpedo tubes; (six forward, four aft)

USS Grampus (SS-523), a Tench-class submarine, was the seventh ship of the United States Navy to be named for two members of the dolphin family (Delphinidae): Grampus griseus, also known as Risso's dolphin, and the orca, also known as the killer whale.

== Construction and commissioning ==
Grampus′s keel was laid down on 8 February 1944 at the Boston Navy Yard in Boston, Massachusetts. She was launched on 16 December 1944, but World War II ended before she was completed, and she sat idle until construction resumed in 1948. On 26 October 1949, she was both christened — by her sponsor, Charlotte Linné Woodward, wife of Vice Admiral Clark H. Woodward, who also sponsored the previous USS Grampus (SS-207) and commissioned.

== Operational history ==
=== 1949-1966 ===
With her new snorkeling equipment, which permitted her to remain submerged for periods far longer than the World War II fleet submarines, Grampus served as a prototype for the GUPPY submarines and also incorporated many features to appear later in nuclear submarines. Attached to SubDiv 61 at Norfolk, Virginia, she participated in a variety of exercises along the East Coast and in the Caribbean Sea, including torpedo and attack exercises, snorkeling tests and demonstrations, and antisubmarine training. Grampus also did a great deal of work with the early HUK (Hunter-Killer) antisubmarine patrols, now a vital part of American defenses, to whose development she greatly contributed.

From 5 January to 2 April 1955 Grampus proceeded independently to the Mediterranean Sea, where she "showed the flag" at Algiers, Naples, Barcelona, Malta, Beirut, Monaco, and Gibraltar before returning to Norfolk and her routine of exercises and tests, spaced with regular overhauls at Portsmouth, New Hampshire, and Philadelphia, Pennsylvania. During the late 1950s and early 1960s Grampus operated out of Norfolk in the North Atlantic.

Under the command of Lieutenant Commander D.A. Kilmer, Grampus sailed with Task Force "Alfa" for six weeks prior to 13 February 1964. On 3 April, she deployed with the Sixth Fleet in the Mediterranean Sea until 3 August.

She operated out of the Virginia Capes until entering Philadelphia Naval Shipyard in mid-April 1965 for overhaul. After refresher training and shakedown in the fall, Grampus operated along the East Coast engaging primarily in ASW exercises.

She departed Norfolk, Virginia, on 13 May 1966 for the eastern Atlantic and Northern European countries to participate in NATO ASW exercises. Back in Norfolk on 30 August, she resumed operations in the Virginia Capes area and Caribbean Sea until sailing 29 December to Philadelphia, Pennsylvania, for repairs in the naval shipyard. Shipshape again, she resumed operations with the Atlantic Fleet.

=== 1967-1981 (Decommissioning and service for Brazil) ===
Grampus was decommissioned and struck from the Naval Vessel Register on 13 May 1972, and sold under the Security Assistance Program to Brazil, where was renamed Rio Grande do Sul (S-11). (She replaced the previous Rio Grande do Sul (S-11), ex-Sand Lance.) After six years of service, she was decommissioned on 16 November 1978 and scrapped on 18 June 1981.
