= USS Trutta =

Submarine of the United States

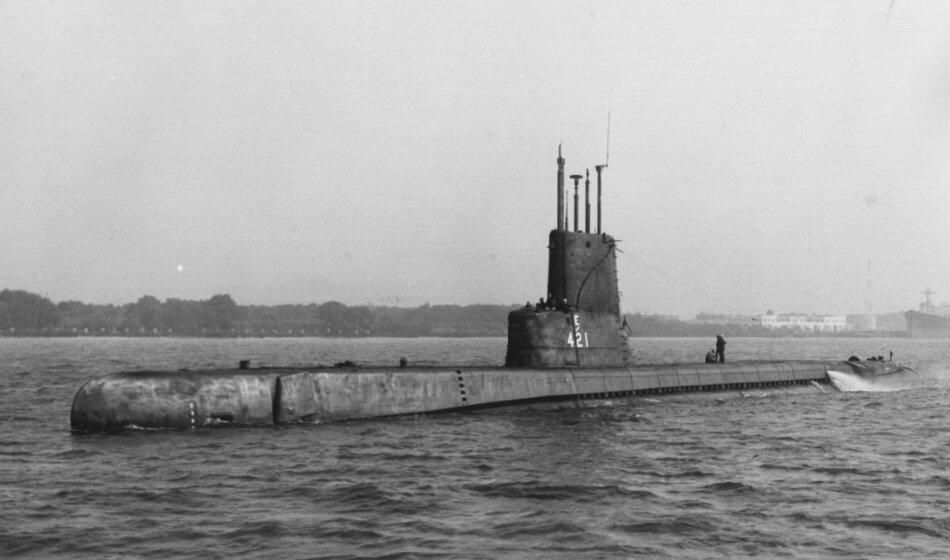
- USS Trutta (SS-421)

History

United States
- Name: USS Trutta (SS-421)
- Builder: Portsmouth Naval Shipyard, Kittery, Maine
- Laid down: 22 May 1944
- Launched: 18 August 1944
- Commissioned: 16 November 1944
- Decommissioned: 1947
- Recommissioned: 1 March 1951
- Decommissioned: 14 May 1952
- Recommissioned: 2 January 1953
- Decommissioned: 1 July 1972
- Stricken: 1 July 1972
- Fate: Transferred to Turkey, 1 July 1972

Turkey
- Name: TCG Cerbe (S 340)
- Namesake: Battle of Djerba
- Acquired: 1 July 1972
- Decommissioned: 23 July 1999

General characteristics (As completed)
- Class & type: Tench-class diesel-electric submarine
- Displacement: 1,570 tons (1,595 t) surfaced; 2,414 tons (2,453 t) submerged
- Length: 311 ft 8 in (95.00 m)
- Beam: 27 ft 4 in (8.33 m)
- Draft: 17 ft (5.2 m) maximum
- Propulsion: 4 × Fairbanks-Morse Model 38D8-⅛ 10-cylinder opposed piston diesel engines driving electrical generators; 2 × 126-cell Sargo batteries; 2 × low-speed direct-drive Elliott electric motors; two propellers; 5,400 shp (4.0 MW) surfaced; 2,740 shp (2.0 MW) submerged
- Speed: 20.25 knots (38 km/h) surfaced; 8.75 knots (16 km/h) submerged
- Range: 11,000 nautical miles (20,000 km) surfaced at 10 knots (19 km/h)
- Endurance: 48 hours at 2 knots (3.7 km/h) submerged; 75 days on patrol
- Test depth: 400 ft (120 m)
- Complement: 10 officers, 71 enlisted
- Armament: 10 × 21-inch (533 mm) torpedo tubes; (6 forward, 4 aft); 28 torpedoes; 1 × 5-inch (127 mm) / 25 caliber deck gun; Bofors 40 mm and Oerlikon 20 mm cannon

General characteristics (Guppy IIA)
- Displacement: 1,848 tons (1,878 t) surfaced; 2,440 tons (2,479 t) submerged
- Length: 307 ft (93.6 m)
- Beam: 27 ft 4 in (8.3 m)
- Draft: 17 ft (5.2 m)
- Propulsion: Snorkel added; One diesel engine and generator removed; Batteries upgraded to Sargo II
- Speed: Surfaced: 17.0 knots (31.5 km/h) maximum; 13.5 knots (25.0 km/h) cruising; Submerged: 14.1 knots (26.1 km/h) for ½ hour; 8.0 knots (14.8 km/h) snorkeling; 3.0 knots (5.6 km/h) cruising
- Armament: 10 × 21 inch (533 mm) torpedo tubes; (six forward, four aft); all guns removed

USS Trutta (hull number SS-421), a Tench-class submarine, was the only ship of the United States Navy to be named for the trutta, a variety of trout, distinguished from the typical trout by its small, black spots and its smaller and fewer scales. She was originally assigned the name Tomtate, often misspelled as Tomatate, and would have made her the only ship named for the tomtate, a food fish of warm American waters having a compressed body, a toothless palate, and conical jaw teeth, but was renamed Trutta on 24 September 1942. Her keel was laid down on 22 May 1944 by the Portsmouth Navy Yard. She was launched on 18 August 1944 sponsored by Mrs. Edward C. Magdeburger, and commissioned on 16 November 1944 with Commander Arthur C. Smith in command.

== First War Patrol ==
Following outfitting and shakedown, Trutta underwent 30 days of intensive training in the Portsmouth-New London area and then set a course southward and steamed via the Canal Zone to arrive at Pearl Harbor on 25 February 1945. After a period of advanced training, Trutta got underway from Oahu with Parche (SS-384) and Lionfish (SS-298), members of a coordinated attack group under Trutta's direction and arrived at Saipan on 30 March. The following day, as she was leaving Tanapag Harbor on her first war patrol, the submarine struck a cable connected to an oil drum adrift in the charted channel and was forced to return to Saipan to repair her damaged propeller blades. The submarine finally got underway on 3 April and proceeded as rapidly as possible toward her patrol area.

On 7 April, she changed course in an attempt to intercept a Japanese naval force which had sortied from Bungo Suido late the day before. It was feared that this task force, headed by Yamato, the world's largest battleship, would interrupt the assault on Okinawa to the south. Despite her full-power running, Trutta did not intercept the Japanese ships because they changed their course. Nevertheless, the Japanese force did not reach Okinawa because on that day fliers from the carriers of Vice Admiral Mitscher's Task Force 58 sank Yamato, light cruiser Yahagi, and destroyer Hamakaze, and inflicted irremediable damage to three other destroyers which the Japanese scuttled. After receiving news of this successful battle, Trutta headed southward on 9 April. Proceeding via the Nansei Shoto, she avoided the hostile notice of enemy aircraft and weathered gale-force winds and force-five seas before entering her patrol area in the East China Sea on the afternoon of 11 April. There, she patrolled along the Shanghai-Quelpart Island traffic routes. On 13 April, while pursuing an antisubmarine force of three Japanese destroyers, she passed through an uncharted minefield before the ships changed course and outdistanced her.

While patrolling near the entrance to Daito Wan on the western coast of Korea on 18 April, she sank one small freighter with gunfire and damaged another. Off the China coast on 22 April, Trutta narrowly escaped damage when an enemy float plane dropped two bombs which exploded over the diving submarine. Shortly after midnight three days later, as Trutta patrolled west of Quelpart Island, lookouts on the submarine's bridge were startled to see a torpedo pass astern. As Trutta put on speed and turned parallel to the torpedo's wake, another torpedo passed by her port side moving from stern to bow, a sinister reminder that she was not alone in the Yellow Sea. Fortunately, Trutta observed no further sign of the Japanese submarine, and she continued her patrols until 26 April when she headed for Guam.

Late in the day, on 27 April, as she passed between Akuseki Shima and Takara Shima in the northern Ryukyus, she made contact with a Japanese plane. The harbinger of a prolonged coordinated holddown attempt. The next morning, finding her adversary of the night before replaced by two "Settles," the submarine, low on air and battery power, sent a message indicating that she would have to surface and fight it out if the situation did not improve before noon. A little more than an hour later, 10 American fighters from Okinawa appeared and routed the Japanese planes. Friendly air cover remained with the submarine until she recharged her batteries and filled her air flasks. She then proceeded independently to the Marianas, arriving at Guam on 4 May.

== Second War Patrol ==
Following refitting and exercises with battleship South Dakota (BB-57), Trutta got underway on 2 June in company with Queenfish (SS-393). She weathered a typhoon before arriving on lifeguard station on 7 June. That day, while standing lifeguard duty for air strikes on Kobe, the submarine rescued a downed Army aviator who had been adrift in a small rubber boat for nearly a week and, the day before, had also weathered the typhoon.

As air raids against the cities of the Japanese homeland intensified, Trutta manned a lifeguard station south of Kyushu, made patrols just off Bungo Suido, and conducted visual and photo reconnaissance of Tori Shima, approaching to within about one mile (1.6 km) of the island. On 21 June, she departed Bungo Suido to join a coordinated attack group (wolfpack) "Street's Sweepers" patrolling the Yellow and East China Seas. She conducted patrols west of Tsushima Strait and then fired a few diversionary rounds of five-inch (127 mm) fire on Hiradoshima before moving west to take up patrol along the southwest coast of Korea. On 1 July, her persistence paid off when, after pursuing a sailing vessel, she discovered a fleet of schooners. Working quickly to take advantage of surprise and to prevent the ships from fleeing to nearby shallow water, Trutta sank seven of the three- and four-masted schooners in a four-hour action. Crew members boarded and searched two of the vessels and put the schooner crews in lifeboats before destroying the ships.

On 6 July, while patrolling the southern approaches to Daito Wan, she came upon a tug towing three schooners, quickly dispatched the tug and two of its tows with five-inch (127 mm) fire, and left the third in flames. She continued patrolling along the Korean coast until the afternoon of 12 July when she departed the area and set her course for the Marianas.

== End of hostilities ==
She arrived at Guam on 18 July, underwent refitting by Fulton (AS-11), and then got underway on 12 August for her third patrol. Before Trutta arrived in her assigned area, she received official word that peace negotiations had obviated continuing her patrol; the submarine set a northeast course. She arrived at Midway on 24 August and two days later headed home via Pearl Harbor and the Panama Canal. After calls at New Orleans and other gulf and east-coast ports, she arrived at New London early in January 1946 and reported to the Sixth Fleet for inactivation. By March 1946, she had been placed out of commission. She remained in the Reserve Fleet until 1951 when she was reactivated at New London. Recommissioned in March 1951, she operated out of that port until 4 May 1952 when she was again decommissioned, this time at Charleston. Following conversion to a "Guppy II A" submarine, she was recommissioned on 2 January 1953 and joined Submarine Squadron 4 at Key West.

== Post World War II U.S. service ==
For the next 19 years, she operated out of Key West, plying the Atlantic, the Caribbean, and the Gulf of Mexico. During this period, she also made six deployments to the Mediterranean. She assisted in the evaluation of new weapon systems, including electronic counter-measure equipment; served as an antisubmarine warfare training target; trained naval reserves; and participated in fleet exercises. Shortly after her transfer to Squadron 12 on 1 August 1959, she rescued five Cuban refugees who had been adrift in a rubber boat for two days. Still homeported at Key West, she continued her duties through the 1960s, breaking routine with goodwill visits to American and Mediterranean ports, and earning a number of Battle Efficiency "E's." Moored at Key West in November 1969, she celebrated the 25th anniversary of her first commissioning.

== Transfer to Turkish Navy ==
Her long career with the United States Navy drew to its close in 1972. In June of that year, she trained a turnover crew of the Turkish Navy, and the veteran submarine was decommissioned on 1 July and turned over to the Navy of the Republic of Turkey. She was renamed TCG Cerbe (S 340) (the Turkish name of the island of Djerba, in reference to the 1560 Battle of Djerba). Trutta was struck from the Naval Vessel Register on that same day.

The Turkish Navy decommissioned Cerbe on 23 July 1999 at the Gölcük Navy Yard. Today, her sail is preserved as a memorial to Turkish submariners.

Trutta received two battle stars for World War II service.
