= USS Corsair =

Two ships of the United States Navy have been named USS Corsair, for the California rockfish, or a pirate or privateer, especially Turkish or Saracen.

- USS Corsair (SP-159) was built as the private yacht Corsair III in 1898, and was acquired and commissioned by the Navy on 15 May 1917. Cross referencing DANFS also finds the names, USC&GS Oceanographer (OSS-26), USS Natchez (PG-85) and USS Oceanographer (AGS-3). as being held by this same ship.
- USS Corsair (SS-435) 1946, was a Tench-class submarine that served during the early years of the Cold War.

== See also ==
- USS Corsair, a fictitious submarine in the 1943 movie Crash Dive
