= USS Argonaut (SS-475) =

Submarine of the United States

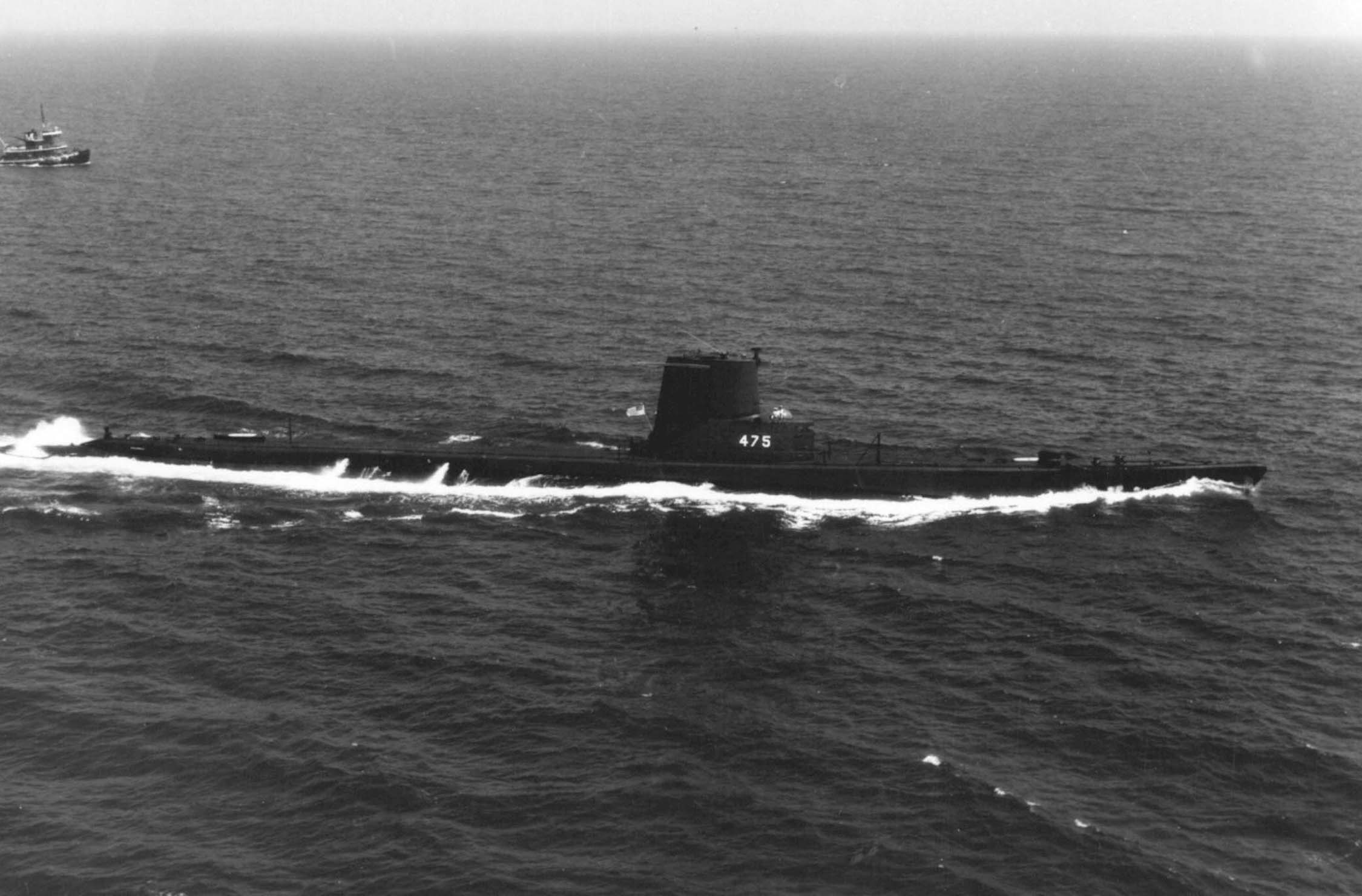
- USS Argonaut off the United States East Coast on 22 July 1963.

History

United States
- Name: USS Argonaut
- Builder: Portsmouth Naval Shipyard, Kittery, Maine
- Laid down: 28 June 1944
- Launched: 1 October 1944
- Commissioned: 15 January 1945
- Decommissioned: 2 December 1968
- Stricken: 2 December 1968
- Identification: SS-475
- Fate: Transferred to Canada, 2 December 1968
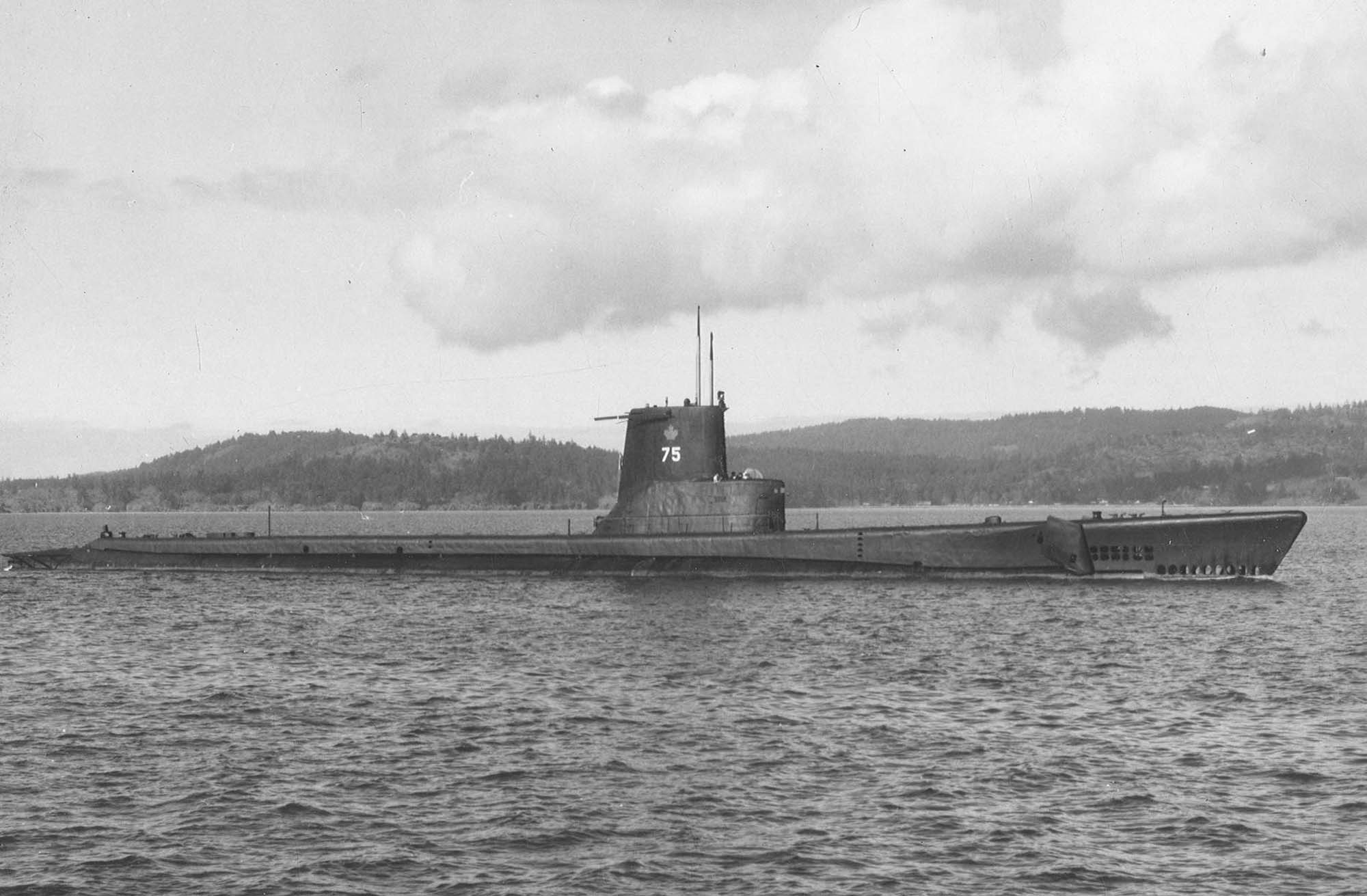
- HMCS Rainbow

Canada
- Name: HMCS Rainbow
- Acquired: 1968
- Commissioned: 2 December 1968
- Decommissioned: 31 December 1974
- Identification: SS 75
- Fate: Scrapped in 1977
- Badge: Argent, a rainbow trout proper issuant from waves of water

General characteristics
- Class & type: Tench-class diesel-electric submarine
- Displacement: 1,570 long tons (1,600 t) surfaced, 2,414 tons (2,453 t) submerged
- Length: 311 ft 8 in (95.00 m)
- Beam: 27 ft 4 in (8.33 m)
- Draft: 17 ft 0 in (5.18 m) maximum
- Propulsion: 4 × Fairbanks-Morse Model 38D8-⅛ 10-cylinder opposed piston diesel engines driving electrical generators; 2 × 126-cell Sargo batteries; 2 × low-speed direct-drive Elliott electric motors; two propellers; 5,400 shp (4.0 MW) surfaced; 2,740 shp (2.0 MW) submerged
- Speed: 20.25 knots (38 km/h) surfaced, 8.75 knots (16 km/h) submerged
- Range: 11,000 nautical miles (20,000 km) surfaced at 10 kn (19 km/h)
- Endurance: 48 hours at 2 knots (3.7 km/h) submerged, 75 days on patrol
- Test depth: 400 ft (120 m)
- Complement: 10 officers, 71 enlisted
- Armament: 10 × 21-inch (533 mm) torpedo tubes; (6 forward, 4 aft); 28 torpedoes; 1 × 5-inch (127 mm) / 25 caliber deck gun; Bofors 40 mm and Oerlikon 20 mm cannon

USS Argonaut (SS-475) was a Tench-class submarine operated by the United States Navy (USN). Constructed at Portsmouth Navy Yard during the second half of 1944, Argonaut was commissioned into the USN in 1945 and operated against Japan during the final year of World War II, although her only contact with the Japanese was when she sank a junk in August. During the 1950s, the submarine was modified for greater underwater endurance, and to guide the Regulus I missile. From 1963 to 1965, Argonaut operated in the Mediterranean Sea.

The submarine was sold to Canada in 1968, commissioned into Maritime Command as HMCS Rainbow (SS 75), and operated until the end of 1974. The submarine was returned to the United States, and scrapped in 1977.

== US service ==
Argonaut was laid down at Portsmouth Navy Yard at Kittery, Maine on 28 June 1944. She was launched on 1 October 1944 sponsored by Mrs. Allan R. McCann and commissioned on 15 January 1945, Lieutenant Commander John S. Schmidt in command.

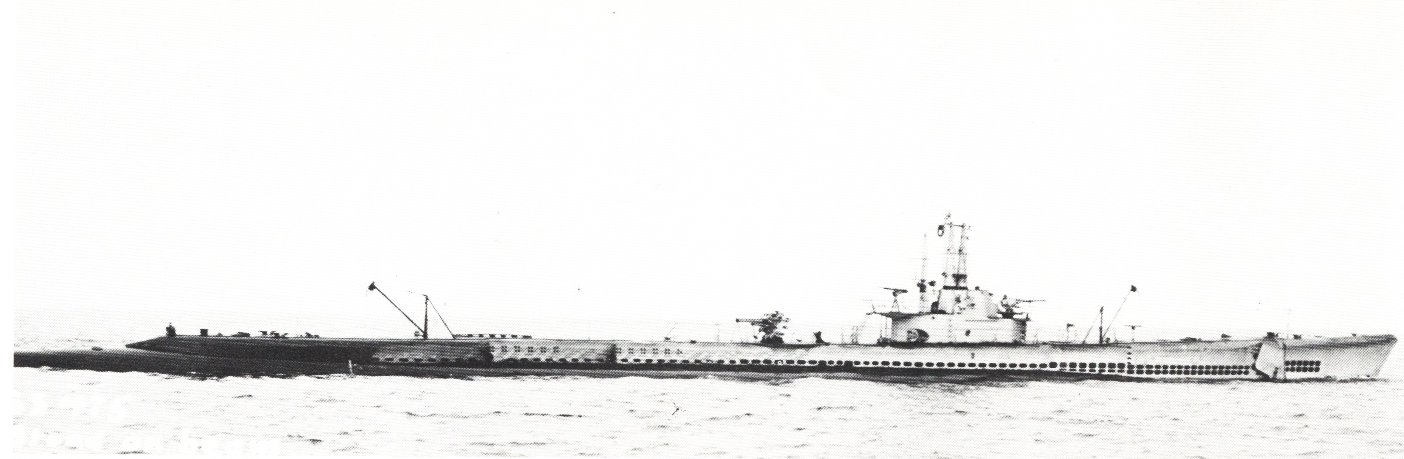
USS Argonaut as she originally appeared, seen at the Panama Canal Zone during training in May 1945.

Argonaut held shakedown in the Portsmouth area and in Narragansett Bay and returned briefly to Portsmouth on 27 March for post-shakedown availability. She then sailed on 14 April for Key West, Florida, where she conducted special tests for lighter-than-air craft and training operations with the Fleet Sound School. Argonaut departed the Florida coast on 13 May to transit the Panama Canal en route Hawaii. Reaching Pearl Harbor on 11 June, the submarine spent two weeks in repairs and training exercises before beginning her first war patrol on 28 June.

She made a fuel stop at Saipan on 10 July and then proceeded to the Formosa Strait and the East China and Yellow Seas to search for enemy shipping. On 16 July, Argonaut spotted a downed aviator, picked him up, and later transferred him to Quillback. Her only contact with Japanese vessels during the patrol came on 12 August, when Argonaut sank a 25-ton junk with fire from her 40 mm and 20 mm guns, her only combat action. She terminated her patrol at Guam on 21 August, six days after Japan capitulated, ending World War II.

=== Post-war ===
Argonaut departed Guam on 1 September and proceeded, via Pearl Harbor and the Panama Canal, to the Naval Frontier Base at Tompkinsville, New York. She arrived in New York on 4 October but continued on to the Portsmouth Naval Shipyard for an overhaul. Early in 1946, Argonaut was assigned to the Atlantic Fleet and was based at Panama. While en route to Panama, Argonaut collided with light cruiser Honolulu off the United States East Coast between New York City and Philadelphia, Pennsylvania during a heavy fog. Honolulu sustained minor damage but Argonaut sustained major damage; with 40 feet (12 m) of the bow bent completely around and facing aft. The submarine was in for major repairs for many months at New London, Connecticut. Later in 1946, Argonaut became a unit of Submarine Squadron 2 (SubRon 2) based at New London, Connecticut.

In July 1952, Argonaut underwent a major conversion as part of the Fleet Snorkel program at the Philadelphia Naval Shipyard, during which she received a snorkel system and a streamlined sail. These changes gave the submarine greater submerged speed and range. Argonaut was one of the few Fleet Snorkel submarines to retain her 5-inch deck gun, until it was removed by 1957.

Argonaut operated from New London until July 1955, when she was reassigned to SubRon 6 at Norfolk, Virginia. Following this move, Argonaut was converted to a guided missile submarine armed with a Regulus I missile.

In 1958, Argonaut's home port was changed to San Juan, Puerto Rico, where she remained for a year, engaged primarily in missile operations as guidance submarine for Regulus missiles. The submarine returned to Norfolk, Virginia in 1959. During an overhaul in early 1960, Argonaut's missile equipment was removed. When the alterations were completed, the submarine resumed her routine of supporting antisubmarine warfare (ASW) training operations out of Norfolk.

On 15 October 1962, Argonaut performed duties in conjunction with the naval quarantine of Cuba. She then had a routine overhaul at the Norfolk Naval Shipyard. The yard work was completed on 13 May 1963, and the submarine sailed to the New London area for refresher training. After further training in the Virginia Capes area, she got underway on 19 August for the Mediterranean and service with the 6th Fleet. Her ports of call during the deployment included Gibraltar; Suda Bay, Crete; Rhodes, Greece; İzmir, Turkey; Toulon, France and Marseille, France; Sanremo, Italy and Naples, Italy. The submarine returned to home port on 15 December.

Argonaut continued her routine of operations along the U.S. east coast with periodic deployments to the Mediterranean. On 1 December 1965 Argonaut commenced overhaul at the Norfolk Naval Shipyard. Argonaut left the shipyard on 10 June 1966 for sea trials, and on 20 January headed for New London for refresher training. She then provided services to the submarine school at New London through the remainder of 1966.

The submarine moved to Norfolk early in 1967, but left the Virginia Capes area on 9 January, bound for San Juan, Puerto Rico. Argonaut took part in Operation "Springboard" through the rest of January and most of February before leaving the Caribbean on 23 February to return to Norfolk, arriving there five days later. For the next two months, Argonaut prepared for a North Atlantic and Mediterranean cruise. She sailed on 26 May and made her first port call at Trondheim, Norway. The submarine also visited Cuxhaven, Germany; Leith, Scotland; Rota, Spain; Naples, Italy; and Valletta, Malta, before returning to her home port on 20 September. She remained in the local operating area through the duration of the year.

The submarine traveled to New London on 6 February 1968 and was in drydock there from 9 to 26 February, returning to Norfolk on 27 February. She made a patrol in the Jacksonville, Florida operating area in mid-March and put in at Port Everglades, Florida on 22 March. Three days later the submarine got underway for her home port. Upon her arrival in Norfolk on 29 March, she assumed a schedule of local operations. This was interrupted by another cruise to Port Everglades in October. She returned that month to Norfolk and began preparations for deactivation. Argonaut was decommissioned on 2 December, and her name was struck from the Naval Vessel Register that same day.

== Canadian service ==
In 1968 Argonaut was put up for sale by the United States. Offered to the Royal Canadian Navy, the US Navy gave Maritime Command five weeks to decide if they wanted the submarine. Argonaut was similar to the submarine HMCS Grilse already on loan from the United States, but significantly upgraded. The purchase was approved after Maritime Command said that Grilse was no longer fit for service and Canada needed a replacement for training purposes.

Canada purchased the hull outright for $153,000 and modernized the submarine at Esquimalt, British Columbia for $2.5 million. In November 1968 the submarine was prepared for departure from Norfolk, Virginia. Argonaut was in poor condition however, with only one of her four diesel engines in working condition, her electrical generator unusable and the boat was leaking.

The boat was commissioned on 2 December 1968 as HMCS Rainbow (SS 75) and sailed for Esquimalt with only two engines working. The submarine caught fire twice while en route to British Columbia, and upon arrival was refused entry into port due to unpaid taxes and customs duty on her purchase. Once the government had paid the $12,000 owing, Rainbow entered Esquimalt and began her refit. The modernization took eight months, after which Rainbow took up Grilse's anti-submarine warfare training on the West Coast.

Rainbow was decommissioned on 31 December 1974 due to budget cuts and her need for a refit. Maritime Command kept the submarine in reserve, laid up until 1976, hoping to return her to service. However, in 1976, the boat was returned to the United States and scrapped at Portland, Oregon in 1977 for $213,687.

== Legacy ==
There is a detailed 1/100 scale model of Argonaut in the Submarine Force Museum in Groton, Connecticut.

== Awards ==
- Asiatic-Pacific Campaign Medal with one battle star
- World War II Victory Medal
- Navy Occupation Medal with "EUROPE" clasp
- National Defense Service Medal with bronze service star

== Sources ==
- Arbuckle, J. Graeme (1987). Badges of the Canadian Navy. Halifax, Nova Scotia: Nimbus Publishing. ISBN 0-920852-49-1.
- Ferguson, Julie H. (1995). Through a Canadian Periscope: The Story of the Canadian Submarine Service. Toronto: Dundurn Press. ISBN 1-55002-217-2.
- Macpherson, Ken; Barrie, Ron (2002). The Ships of Canada's Naval Forces 1910–2002 (Third ed.). St. Catharines, Ontario: Vanwell Publishing. ISBN 1-55125-072-1.
- Milner, Marc (2010). Canada's Navy: The First Century (Second ed.). Toronto: University of Toronto Press. ISBN 978-0-8020-9604-3.
