= USS Burrfish =

Submarine of the United States

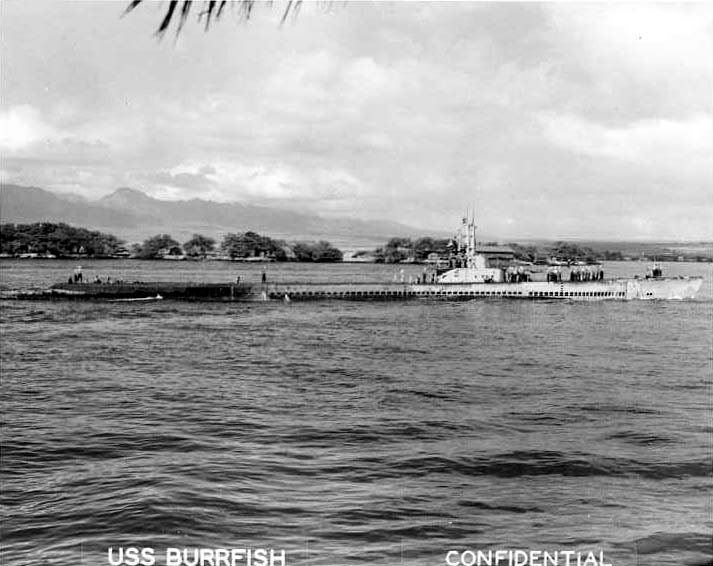
- Burrfish entering Pearl Harbor c. 1944

History

United States
- Name: USS Burrfish
- Namesake: burrfish
- Builder: Portsmouth Naval Shipyard, Kittery, Maine
- Laid down: 24 February 1943
- Launched: 18 June 1943
- Commissioned: 13 September 1943
- Decommissioned: 10 October 1946
- Recommissioned: 2 November 1948
- Decommissioned: 17 December 1956
- Recommissioned: 17 January 1961
- Decommissioned: 11 May 1961
- Stricken: 31 July 1969
- Identification: SS-312
- Fate: Transferred to Canada, 11 May 1961
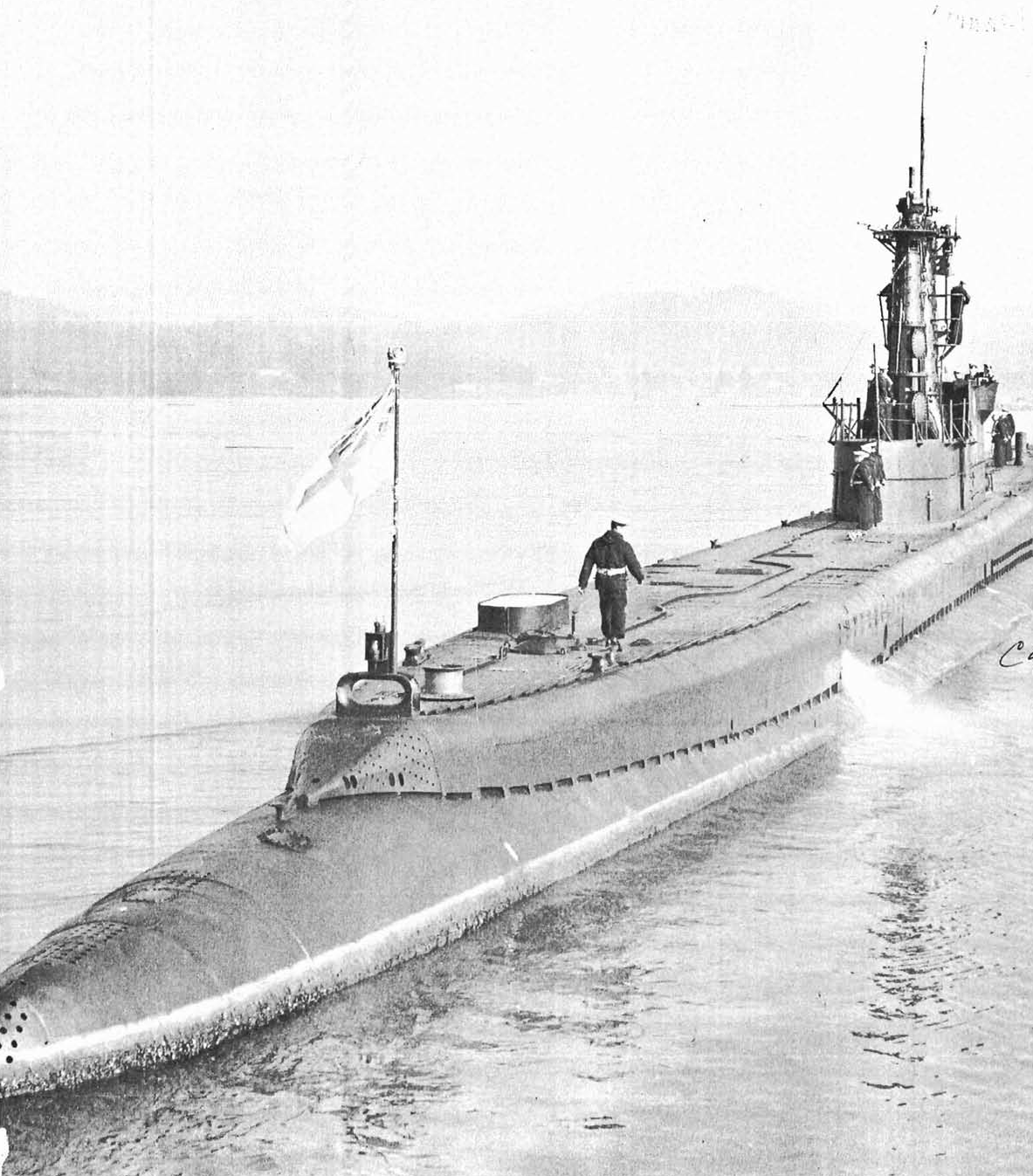
- Grilse in May 1963

Canada
- Name: HMCS Grilse
- Acquired: 11 May 1961
- Commissioned: 11 May 1961
- Decommissioned: 2 October 1969
- Identification: SS 71
- Motto: "Suaviter in modo, fortiter in re" (Suavely in manner, strongly in matter)
- Fate: Returned to the U.S. Navy and sunk as a target off San Clemente Island, California, 19 November 1969
- Badge: Azure, the conventionalized outline of a finless fish, argent

General characteristics
- Class & type: Balao-class diesel-electric submarine
- Displacement: 1,526 tons (1,550 t) surfaced; 2,391 tons (2,429 t) submerged
- Length: 311 ft 6 in (94.95 m)
- Beam: 27 ft 3 in (8.31 m)
- Draft: 16 ft 10 in (5.13 m) maximum
- Propulsion: 4 × Fairbanks-Morse Model 38D8-1/8 9-cylinder opposed-piston diesel engines driving electrical generators; 2 × 126-cell Sargo batteries; 4 × high-speed Elliott electric motors with reduction gears; 2 × propellers; 5,400 shp (4.0 MW) surfaced; 2,740 shp (2.04 MW) submerged
- Speed: 20.25 knots (38 km/h) surfaced; 8.75 knots (16 km/h) submerged
- Range: 11,000 nmi. surfaced at 10 knots; (20,000 km at 19 km/h)
- Endurance: 48 hours at 2 knots (3.7 km/h) submerged; 75 days on patrol
- Test depth: 400 ft (120 m)
- Complement: 10 officers, 70–71 enlisted
- Armament: 10 × 21-inch (533 mm) torpedo tubes; 6 forward, 4 aft; 24 torpedoes; 1 × 5-inch (127 mm) / 25 caliber deck gun; Bofors 40 mm and Oerlikon 20 mm cannon

USS Burrfish (SS/SSR-312) was a Balao-class submarine of the United States Navy named for the burrfish (Chilomycterus schoepfi), a swellfish of the Atlantic coast. The vessel entered service in 1943 and saw action during World War II and in the postwar era. In 1961 Burrfish was loaned to the Royal Canadian Navy where she served as HMCS Grilse (SS 71) and was used primarily as a training boat from 1961 until 1969.

== Construction and career ==
Burrfish was launched on 18 June 1943 by Portsmouth Navy Yard in Kittery, Maine, sponsored by Miss Jane Elizabeth Davis, daughter of Senator James J. Davis from Pennsylvania. The boat was commissioned 14 September 1943.

Burrfish's war operations extended from 2 February 1944 to 13 May 1945 during which period she completed six war patrols, sinking one 5,894-ton German tanker Rossbach in Japanese waters on 7 May 1944 and, along with USS Ronquil, a 200-ton patrol boat on 17 November 1944. Her operating area extended from the Western Caroline Islands to Formosa and the waters south of Japan. During her third war patrol the ship accomplished several special missions, conducting reconnaissance of the beaches of Palau and Yap where landings were planned.

On 20 December 1944, prior to her fifth war patrol, Lieutenant Commander M. H. Lytle relieved Commander W. B. Perkins Jr. as commanding officer of Burrfish.

Burrfish arrived at Pearl Harbor from her last war patrol 13 May 1945. On 16 May she was ordered to return to the United States for major overhaul and arrived at Portsmouth Navy Yard on 19 June. On 12 October 1945 she reported to New London, Connecticut, for inactivation and was placed out of commission in reserve on 10 October 1946.

On 2 November 1948 Burrfish was recommissioned and assigned to Portsmouth Naval Shipyard for conversion to a radar picket submarine. Her designation was changed to SSR-312 on 27 January 1949 and her conversion was completed in November 1949.

Burrfish returned to duty with the active fleet 7 February 1950 and was assigned to Submarine Squadron 6 at Norfolk. Between February 1950 and June 1956 she completed three tours with the 6th Fleet in the Mediterranean Sea; participated in several major type and inter-type exercises; and operated along the eastern seaboard as a radar picket ship.

On 5 June 1956 Burrfish sailed from Norfolk, Virginia to New London where she reported for inactivation. She was placed out of commission in reserve 17 December 1956 and laid up in the Atlantic Reserve Fleet.

=== Service with the Royal Canadian Navy ===
The Royal Canadian Navy was interested in reestablishing its submarine service in the late 1950s and as an essential stopgap to further purchases, they sought a boat to train in. The United States Navy gave them a choice from among ten boats in the Reserve Fleet and Burrfish was selected. An official agreement to loan a submarine to the Royal Canadian Navy was finalized after approval by the Canadian Cabinet and ratification by the United States Congress in May 1960. The loan agreement would last for five years and would include $1,764,000 for the cost of reactivation and modification.

In Fall 1960 the prospective crew was sent to New London, Connecticut for US submarine training. On 17 January 1961 the submarine was recommissioned into the United States Navy as SS-312. The sub was then decommissioned from the United States Navy on 11 May 1961 and recommissioned into the Royal Canadian Navy at New London as HMCS Grilse (SS 71), the second vessel to bear the name. Grilse underwent one month of sea trials before transiting to her new homeport at Esquimalt, British Columbia, arriving on 14 July 1961.

Having reestablished the Canadian submarine service, Grilse was acquired by the Royal Canadian Navy for use as a training vessel for anti-submarine warfare training on the Pacific coast. However, the boat lacked the speed of more modern subs and her sensor and weapons outfit were not up to the task of anti-submarine warfare. As a result, Grilse spent most of her time as "clockwork mice" for surface ships and aircraft, as a passive target for their training. The submarine participated in joint Royal Canadian Navy/Royal Canadian Air Force and joint US/Canada training exercises in the Pacific.

In May 1966, her five-year loan was renewed for $1 million, and the sub underwent a refit in 1967 for $1.2 million. In Spring 1968, Grilse was sent on a training cruise to Japan. Once there, the boat trained with units of the Japanese Maritime Self-Defense Force and the United States Navy. In 1968, the Canadian Navy, now called Maritime Command, was offered a more modern Tench-class submarine by the US. Maritime Command chose to accept the offer and HMCS Rainbow was purchased as a direct replacement for Grilse on the west coast.

With the arrival of Rainbow, Grilse never sailed again. Some of Grilse's more modern gear was taken out and transferred to Rainbow, however Grilse had to remain operationally capable in accordance with the loan agreement and the transfer was limited. The sub returned to the US in September 1969.

The boat was struck from the Naval Register on 19 July 1969. Grilse was officially paid off from Maritime Command on 2 October 1969 and returned to the US Navy the same day. Burrfish was sunk as a target off San Clemente Island, California, on 19 November 1969.

=== Research ===
Grilse was also used as a test platform for measuring the nature of turbulence, the results of which were analyzed by scientists that included French polymath Benoit Mandelbrot, whose thinking on fractals was substantially shaped by this experience:

"On a visit to Vancouver, I asked to listen to the recordings. Not possible, I was told; the audio tapes, while playable, spanned too broad a frequency spectrum from high pitch to low, most of them outside human earshot. But surely, I said, you can speed up and slow down the tape? I insisted. And, after some fumbling with the then-primitive equipment, they obliged me. We sat and listened. Just listened. Loud high pitch, then low rumblings. Then high pitch again; more rumblings. Change the tape speed: Same pattern. Now, most people listening to this would call it stretches of high-frequency noise interrupted by low patches. But if they had taken the trouble to study the intervals, to analyze the relative proportions of high and low patches, they would have found something else: a turbulent process that proceeds in bursts and pauses, and whose parts scale fractally. The turbulent water through which the submarine’s nose plowed in a one-dimensional line was not one long alternation of fast and slow water. Instead, seen in all three dimensions, it was a complicated pattern of churning eddies and torrents, all interrelated from start of journey to end of journey—in effect, over an infinite span of time and space.

"That experience underlies all my thinking about financial markets."

– Benoit B. Mandelbrot, The (Mis)Behavior of Markets: A Fractal View of Financial Turbulence

== Awards ==
- Asiatic-Pacific Campaign Medal with five battle stars for World War II service
- Navy Occupation Service Medal with "EUROPE" clasp
