= USS Runner (SS-476) =

Submarine of the United States

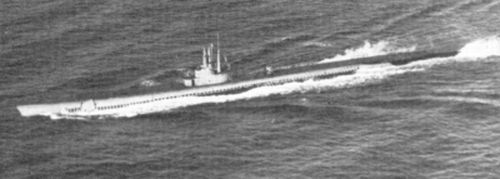
- USS Runner (SS-476)

History

United States
- Name: USS Runner (SS-476)
- Ordered: Runner
- Builder: Portsmouth Naval Shipyard, Kittery, Maine
- Laid down: 10 July 1944
- Launched: 17 October 1944
- Sponsored by: Mrs. R. H. Bass
- Commissioned: 6 February 1945
- Decommissioned: 29 June 1970
- Stricken: 15 December 1971
- Fate: Sold for scrap, 19 June 1973

General characteristics
- Class & type: Tench-class diesel-electric submarine
- Displacement: 1,570 tons (1,595 t) surfaced; 2,414 tons (2,453 t) submerged
- Length: 311 ft 8 in (95.00 m)
- Beam: 27 ft 4 in (8.33 m)
- Draft: 17 ft 0 in (5.18 m) maximum
- Propulsion: 4 × Fairbanks-Morse Model 38D8-⅛ 10-cylinder opposed piston diesel engines driving electrical generators; 2 × 126-cell Sargo batteries; 2 × low-speed direct-drive Elliott electric motors; two propellers; 5,400 shp (4.0 MW) surfaced; 2,740 shp (2.0 MW) submerged
- Speed: 20.25 knots (38 km/h) surfaced; 8.75 knots (16 km/h) submerged
- Range: 11,000 nautical miles (20,000 km) surfaced at 10 knots (19 km/h)
- Endurance: 48 hours at 2 knots (3.7 km/h) submerged; 75 days on patrol
- Test depth: 400 ft (120 m)
- Complement: 10 officers, 71 enlisted
- Armament: 10 × 21-inch (533 mm) torpedo tubes; (6 forward, 4 aft); 28 torpedoes; 1 × 5-inch (127 mm) / 25 caliber deck gun; Bofors 40 mm and Oerlikon 20 mm cannon

USS Runner (SS/AGSS-476), a Tench-class submarine, was the second ship of the United States Navy to be named for the runner, an amberfish inhabiting subtropical waters.

== Construction and commissioning ==
Runner′ s keel was laid down on 10 July 1944 by the Portsmouth Naval Shipyard at Kittery, Maine. She was launched on 17 October 1944, sponsored by Mrs. R. H. Bass, the wife of the prospective commanding officer, and commissioned on 6 February 1945.

== Service history ==
=== World War II ===
After shakedown and preliminary training off the United States East Coast, Runner departed New London, Connecticut, on 5 April 1945, conducted intensive training at Key West, Florida, and Balboa, Panama Canal Zone, and arrived at Pearl Harbor, Hawaii, on 21 May 1945. Her first war patrol of World War II was off the east coast of Honshū, Japan, where her primary mission was to scout for the presence of defensive minefields guarding the Japanese Home Islands. On 10 July 1945, while on patrol in the Sea of Japan, she intercepted two worthwhile Japanese targets, a tanker and a minesweeper. The tanker and her two escorts escaped the spread of torpedoes Runner fired at them, but three of Runner's torpedoes splintered the minesweeper W-27. Before departing station, Runner took aboard 16 downed aviators from the submarines USS Gabilan (SS-252) and USS Aspro (SS-309) for transfer to Guam, where Runner concluded her patrol with her arrival on 24 July 1945.

Runner′s second war patrol began a week prior to the Japanese capitulation on 15 August 1945, and by the time she arrived on station off the east coast of Honshū, peace had come. Runner, with ten other U.S. Navy submarines, entered Tokyo Bay on 31 August 1945 and represented the U.S. Navy submarine service at the formal surrender ceremonies on 2 September 1945.

=== Post-World War II ===
Runner and the other submarines in Tokyo Bay departed Japan on 3 September 1945, arriving at Pearl Harbor on 12 September. She continued east until reaching New London on 6 October 1945 . A few weeks later, in company with other vessels of Submarine Squadron 6, Runner proceeded south, arriving for duty at Balboa, Panama Canal Zone, on 14 February 1946. For the next three years, she was based at the Panama Canal Zone and participated in annual fleet exercises in the Caribbean Sea.

In June 1949, Runner was reassigned to Norfolk, Virginia, her base for the next seven years. In the autumn of 1957, she participated in North Atlantic Treaty Organization (NATO) exercises in the North Atlantic Ocean, visiting ports in France and England. Home-ported in San Juan, Puerto Rico, from July 1958 to July 1959, she operated in the Caribbean Sea as a Regulus missile guidance submarine.

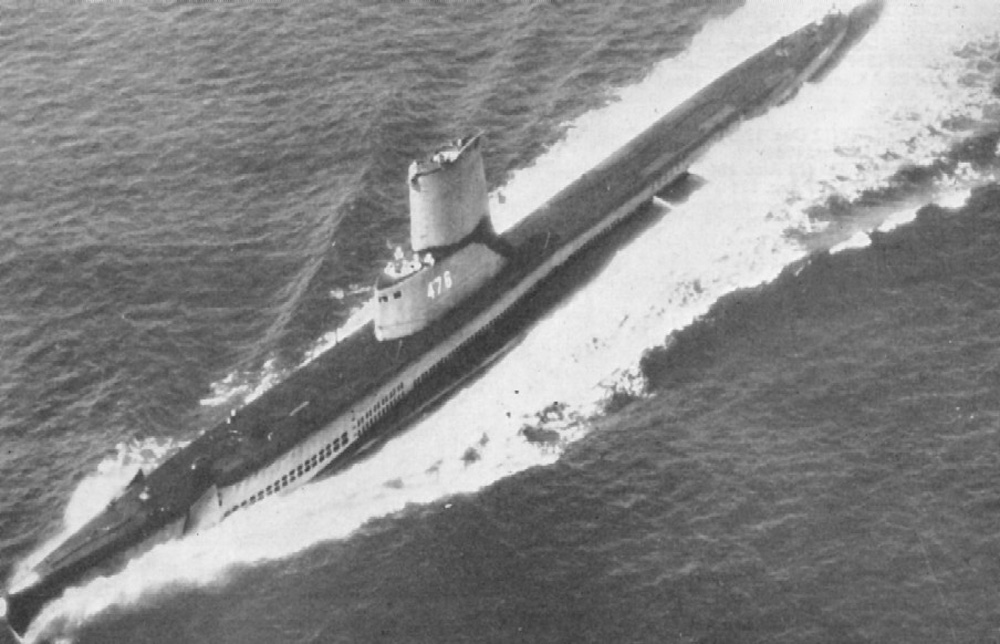
Runner (SS-476), underway, port-side view, as a Regulus missile guidance submarine, circa 1961.

Returning to Norfolk in July 1959, Runner operated with the fleet along the U.S. East Coast for the next three years. She deployed to the Mediterranean Sea from January to early May 1962, operating with United States and NATO units. She spent the remainder of 1962 on local antisubmarine warfare exercises and overhaul.

Throughout 1963 and 1964, Runner engaged in various antisubmarine warfare exercises in the western Atlantic. She spent the summer of 1964 in the Great Lakes, training United States Naval Reserve personnel. After operating with the fleet in the spring of 1965, she entered Norfolk Naval Shipyard at Portsmouth, Virginia, for overhaul. In 1966, her operations included services for antisubmarine warfare exercises, type training, and participation in Exercise Springboard in the early spring. Runner deployed to the Mediterranean Sea with the United States Sixth Fleet from 8 July to 28 October 1966. She spent most of 1967 on school services for future submariners.

Runner began 1968 by providing services for the Underwater Demolition Team school at Little Creek, Virginia, and antisubmarine warfare training off the U.S. East Coast. On 4 April 1968, she departed on her last Mediterranean Sea deployment. She returned to Norfolk on 31 July 1968 having visited ports in Spain and Portugal, and participating in the NATO exercise Dawn Patrol.

== Decommissioning and disposal ==
On 25 January 1969, Runner was decommissioned at the Boston Naval Shipyard in Boston, Massachusetts, and towed to the Great Lakes Naval Training Station in Lake County, Illinois, where she was reclassified as an "auxiliary submarine," redesignated AGSS-476, and served as a Naval Reserve Training vessel until stricken from the Naval Vessel Register on 15 December 1971. She was sold for scrap on 19 June 1973.

== Honors and awards ==
Runner received one battle star for World War II service.
