= USS Conger =

Submarine of the United States

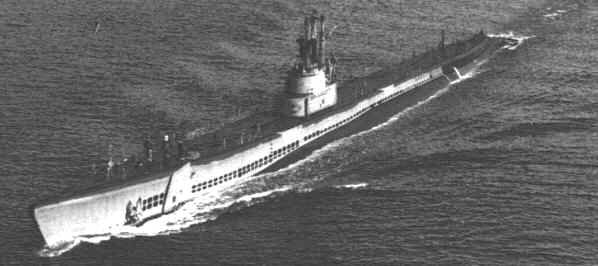
- USS Conger (SS-477)

History

United States
- Builder: Portsmouth Naval Shipyard, Kittery, Maine
- Laid down: 11 July 1944
- Launched: 17 October 1944
- Commissioned: 14 February 1945
- Decommissioned: 29 July 1963
- Stricken: 1 August 1963
- Fate: Sold for scrap, 9 July 1964

General characteristics
- Class & type: Tench-class diesel-electric submarine
- Displacement: 1,570 tons (1,595 t) surfaced; 2,414 tons (2,453 t) submerged
- Length: 311 ft 8 in (95.00 m)
- Beam: 27 ft 4 in (8.33 m)
- Draft: 17 ft 0 in (5.18 m) maximum
- Propulsion: 4 × Fairbanks-Morse Model 38D8-⅛ 10-cylinder opposed piston diesel engines driving electrical generators; 2 × 126-cell Sargo batteries; 2 × low-speed direct-drive Elliott electric motors; two propellers; 5,400 shp (4.0 MW) surfaced; 2,740 shp (2.0 MW) submerged
- Speed: 20.25 knots (38 km/h) surfaced; 8.75 knots (16 km/h) submerged
- Range: 11,000 nautical miles (20,000 km) surfaced at 10 knots (19 km/h)
- Endurance: 48 hours at 2 knots (3.7 km/h) submerged; 75 days on patrol
- Test depth: 400 ft (120 m)
- Complement: 10 officers, 71 enlisted
- Armament: 10 × 21-inch (533 mm) torpedo tubes; (6 forward, 4 aft); 28 torpedoes; 1 × 5-inch (127 mm) / 25 caliber deck gun; Bofors 40 mm and Oerlikon 20 mm cannon

USS Conger (SS/AGSS-477), a Tench-class submarine, was the only ship of the United States Navy to be named for the conger, an eel found in warm seas at moderate depths, common to both coasts of the Atlantic Ocean.

== Construction and design ==
Her keel was laid down on 11 July 1944 by the Portsmouth Naval Shipyard. She was launched on 17 October 1944 sponsored by Mrs. W. C. Ploeser, and commissioned on 14 February 1945.

== Service history ==
Conger tested new submarine equipment at New London, Connecticut, until she cleared 21 July 1945 for Pacific service. At sea between Balboa, Panama, and Pearl Harbor upon the end of hostilities, she was ordered back to the Panama Canal Zone, and on 4 September arrived at Key West, Florida, to provide services to the Fleet Sonar School until 6 December. She sailed then for New London and Tompkinsville, New York, where she lay until sailing 10 January 1946 for her assigned home port at Cristobal, Canal Zone. Conger operated in the Caribbean Sea, calling at Memphis, Tennessee, and Vicksburg, Mississippi, in May 1947, until 23 August, when she sailed for a complete circuit of the South American continent on special hydrographic work, passing through the Straits of Magellan. She returned to the Canal Zone 5 October to resume her Caribbean operations, and on 11 January 1948, she made her base at Key West, Florida. On 3 June 1949 her home port became Norfolk, Virginia, and she operated along the East Coast and in the Caribbean assisting in the training of surface ships, taking part in fleet exercises, and perfecting her own readiness for action. She was again transferred in 1952, arriving at New London, Connecticut, her new home port, 12 December. From that time through 1960, she continued her East Coast operations, and frequently went to sea with student submariners on board.

Conger was fitted with Bottom Reflection Active Sonar System II (BRASS II) sonar equipment in 1961. BRASS II led to the sonar sphere used on the Thresher class and all subsequent US attack submarines. Conger was reclassified as an auxiliary submarine and given the hull classification symbol AGSS-477 in 1962. She was decommissioned on 29 July 1963, struck from the Naval Vessel Register on 1 August 1963, and sold for scrapping in May 1964. Her name plate is on display at Freedom Park.
