= USS Cutlass =

Submarine of the United States

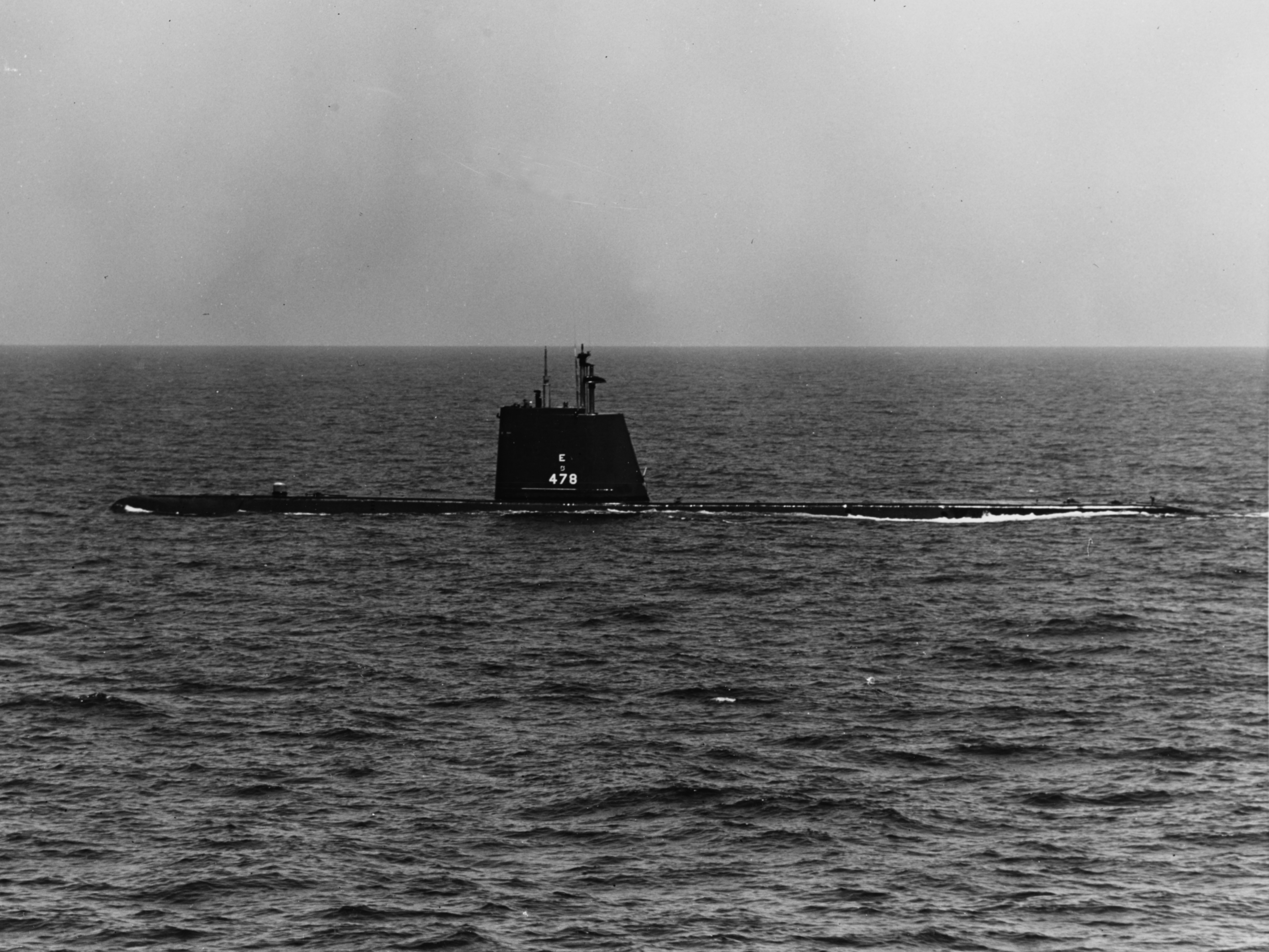
- USS Cutlass operating with the aircraft carrier USS Lake Champlain in 1962

History

United States
- Name: Cutlass
- Namesake: Cutlassfish
- Builder: Portsmouth Naval Shipyard, Kittery, Maine
- Laid down: 22 July 1944
- Launched: 5 November 1944
- Commissioned: 17 March 1945
- Decommissioned: 15 April 1973
- Stricken: 15 April 1973
- Fate: Transferred to Taiwan (Republic of China), 15 April 1973
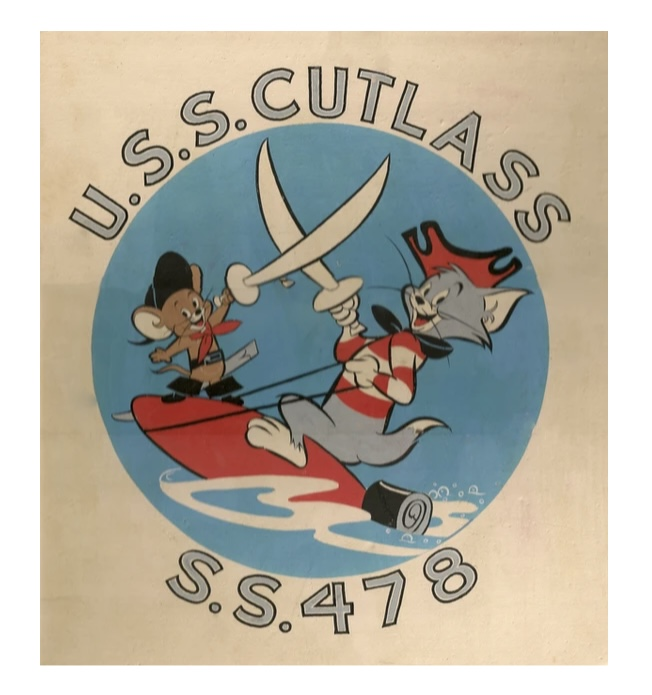
- Badge

Taiwan
- Name: ROCS Hai Shih (SS-791)
- Acquired: 12 April 1973
- Status: Active

General characteristics (As completed)
- Class & type: Tench-class diesel-electric submarine
- Displacement: 1,570 tons (1,595 t) surfaced; 2,414 tons (2,453 t) submerged
- Length: 311 ft 8 in (95.00 m)
- Beam: 27 ft 4 in (8.33 m)
- Draft: 17 ft (5.2 m) maximum
- Propulsion: 4 × Fairbanks-Morse Model 38D8-⅛ 10-cylinder opposed piston diesel engines driving electrical generators; 2 × 126-cell Sargo batteries; 2 × low-speed direct-drive Elliott electric motors; two propellers; 5,400 shp (4.0 MW) surfaced; 2,740 shp (2.0 MW) submerged
- Speed: 20.25 knots (38 km/h) surfaced; 8.75 knots (16 km/h) submerged
- Range: 11,000 nautical miles (20,000 km) surfaced at 10 knots (19 km/h)
- Endurance: 48 hours at 2 knots (3.7 km/h) submerged; 75 days on patrol
- Test depth: 400 ft (120 m)
- Complement: 10 officers, 71 enlisted
- Armament: 10 × 21-inch (533 mm) torpedo tubes; (6 forward, 4 aft); 28 torpedoes; 1 × 5-inch (127 mm) / 25 caliber deck gun; Bofors 40 mm and Oerlikon 20 mm cannon

General characteristics (Guppy II)
- Displacement: 1,870 tons (1,900 t) surfaced; 2,440 tons (2,480 t) submerged
- Length: 307 ft (93.6 m)
- Beam: 27 ft 4 in (7.4 m)
- Draft: 17 ft (5.2 m)
- Propulsion: Snorkel added; Batteries upgraded to GUPPY type, capacity expanded to 504 cells (4 × 126 cell batteries)
- Speed: Surfaced: 18.0 knots (33.3 km/h) maximum; 13.5 knots (25.0 km/h) cruising; Submerged: 16.0 knots (29.6 km/h) for ½ hour; 9.0 knots (16.7 km/h) snorkeling; 3.5 knots (6.5 km/h) cruising
- Range: 15,000 nm (28,000 km) surfaced at 11 knots (20 km/h)
- Endurance: 48 hours at 4 knots (7 km/h) submerged
- Complement: 9–10 officers; 5 petty officers; 70 enlisted men
- Sensors & processing systems: AN/BQS-4 active sonar; AN/BQR-2 passive sonar; Mk 106 torpedo fire control system
- Armament: 10 × 21-inch (533 mm) torpedo tubes; (six forward, four aft); all guns removed

USS Cutlass (hull number SS-478), renamed as ROCS Hai Shih (SS-791) since 1973, is a Tench-class submarine now in the service of the Republic of China Navy. She was the only ship of the United States Navy to be named for the cutlassfish, a long, thin fish found widely along the coasts of the United States and in the West Indies. Her keel was laid down by the Portsmouth Navy Yard on 10 July 1944. She was launched on 5 November 1944 sponsored by Mrs. R. E. Kintner, and commissioned on 17 March 1945 with Commander Herbert L. Jukes in command.

Decommissioned and struck from the U.S. naval register in 1973, Cutlass was transferred to the Republic of China Navy and renamed ROCS Hai Shih (SS-791). She is expected to remain in service until at least 2026, 53 years after she entered service with the ROC Navy and 82 years after she was first launched.

== Operational history ==
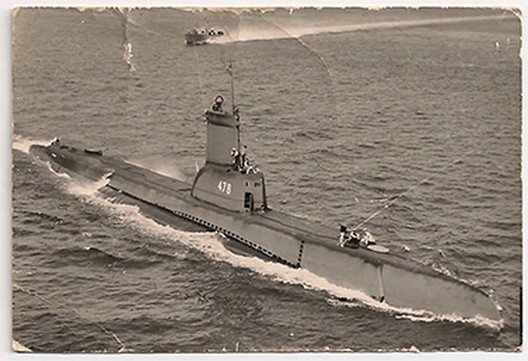
Cruising the Mediterranean Sea, visiting France, Greece, Turkey, North Africa, Gibraltar, Malta, and Spain.

=== 1945–1973 (U.S.) ===
Departing Portsmouth, New Hampshire, on 25 April 1945, Cutlass arrived at Pearl Harbor on 15 July and put out on her maiden war patrol two days later. Assigned to patrol in the vicinity of the Kurile Islands, she entered the area one day after the announced Japanese surrender, remained on observation patrol until 24 August, then returned to Pearl Harbor. She sailed on 2 September for New York, arriving 24 September to receive visitors through Navy Day.

Cutlass cruised on the East Coast until 8 January 1946 when she cleared for the Panama Canal Zone. Except for three months of operations in Delaware Bay, Cutlass remained in the Caribbean Sea, based at Cristóbal, Canal Zone. From 23 August to 2 October 1947 she made a cruise down the coast of South America, around Cape Horn, visited Valparaíso, Chile, and returned to the east coast of South America through the Straits of Magellan.

Cutlass left the Panama Canal Zone 6 January 1948 for local operations at Key West, Florida, then entered Philadelphia Naval Shipyard in March for overhaul and modernization. Arriving at Key West 7 February 1949 she served as test submarine for Operation "Rainbow" evaluating color schemes to enhance livability, a serious problem in new submarines with long submergence capability. She continued to sail out of Key West until the summer of 1952 when her home port was changed to Norfolk, Virginia.

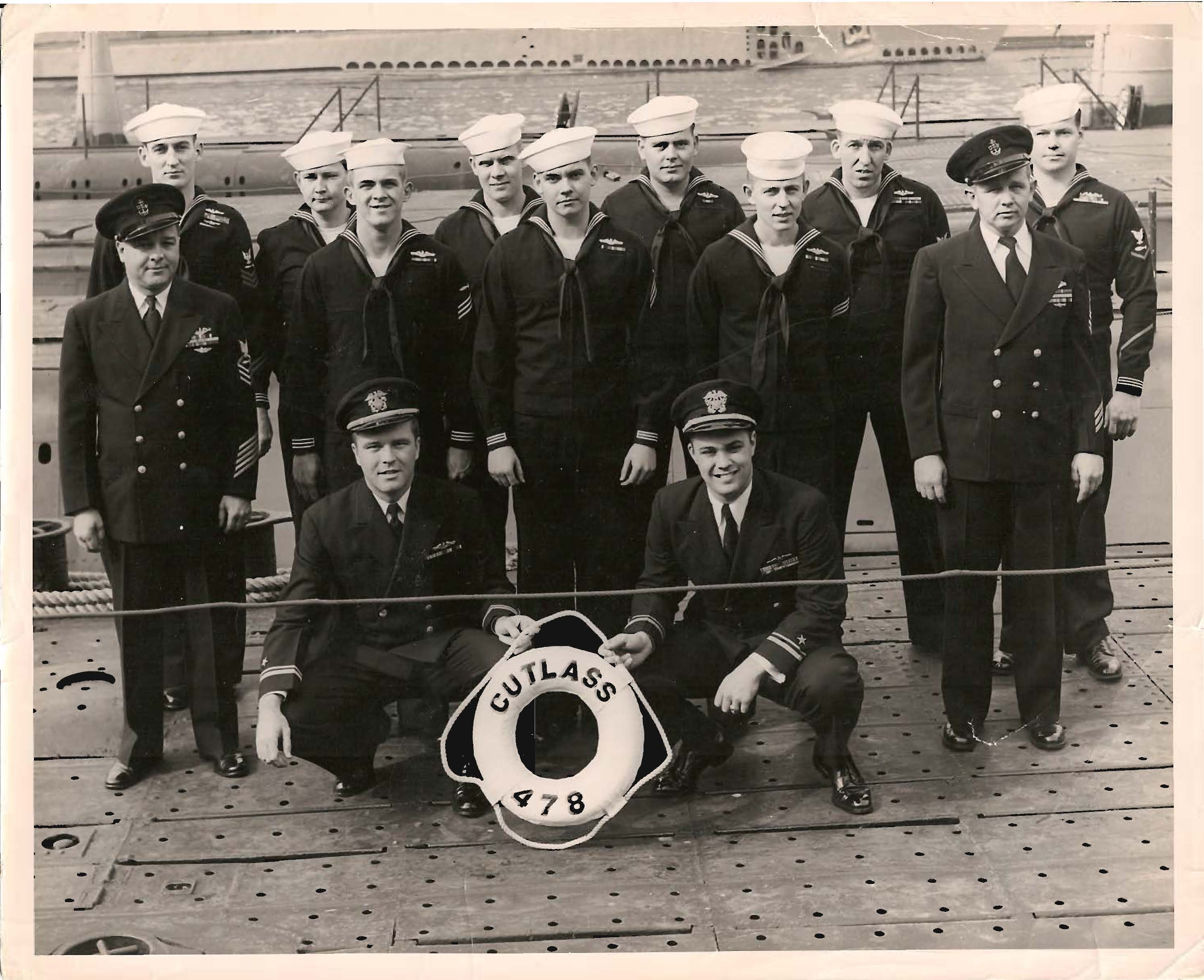
Aboard the USS Cutlass (SS-478), in 1955

In 1953 Cutlass cruised to the Mediterranean Sea, visiting France, Greece, Turkey, North Africa, Gibraltar, Malta, and Spain, then sailed in Cuban waters to act as target for destroyers and aircraft engaged in antisubmarine exercises. She joined in local operations, fleet exercises and antisubmarine warfare training in the Caribbean Sea until September 1956 when she departed for the Mediterranean and operations with NATO forces including the Sixth Fleet. She visited Italy, Greece, Crete, Mallorca, Portugal and England, returning to Norfolk in December. In 1958 she sailed on a north European cruise, visiting Rosyth, Scotland, Copenhagen and Korsor, Denmark, and passing through the Kiel Canal.

In the first half of 1959, Cutlass joined in the antisubmarine warfare development work of Task Force "Alfa" off the Virginia Capes, and in September sailed for the Mediterranean. In November she passed through the Suez Canal to join ships of the Pakistani Navy in exercises off Karachi, returning to Norfolk in December. After continued operations with TF "Alfa," she entered Philadelphia Naval Shipyard in February 1960 for an overhaul which continued until August. Cutlass was decommissioned and struck from the Naval Vessel Register on 15 April 1973.

=== 1973–present (Taiwan) ===
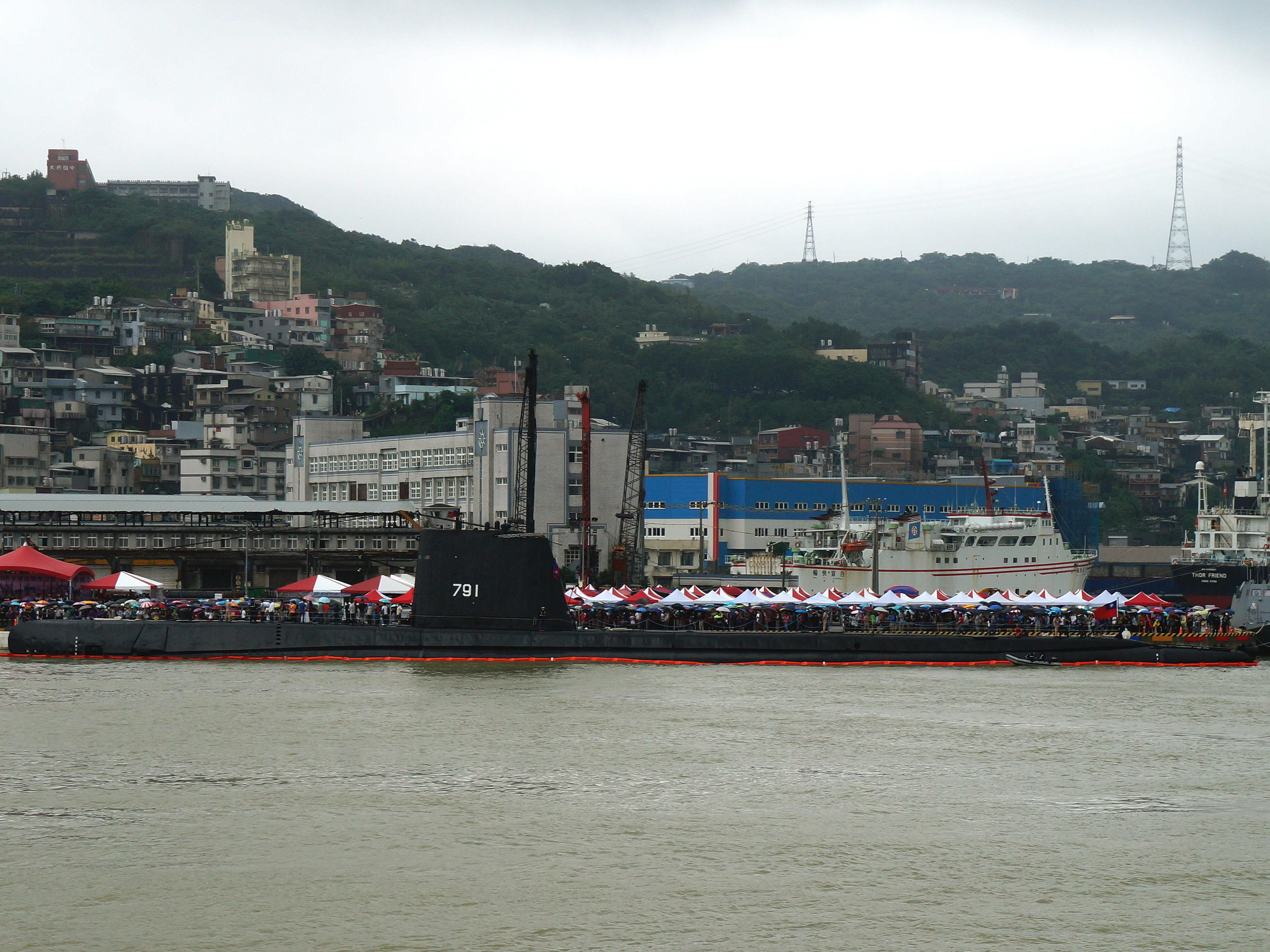
ROCS Hai Shih (SS-791) in September 2019

On 4 December 1973, Cutlass had her torpedo tubes sealed and was sold to Taiwan, where she was commissioned in the Republic of China Navy as ROCS Hai Shih (SS-791), (meaning "sea lion"). They then tried to restore her torpedo capabilities. In January 2017, Taiwan announced that she would receive a retrofit to extend her service life until 2026, making her the longest-serving submarine in history. The submarine is still operational and reportedly capable of combat. The $19 million retrofit was to improve the hull and the diesel vessel's navigational elements.
