= USS Remora =

Submarine of the United States

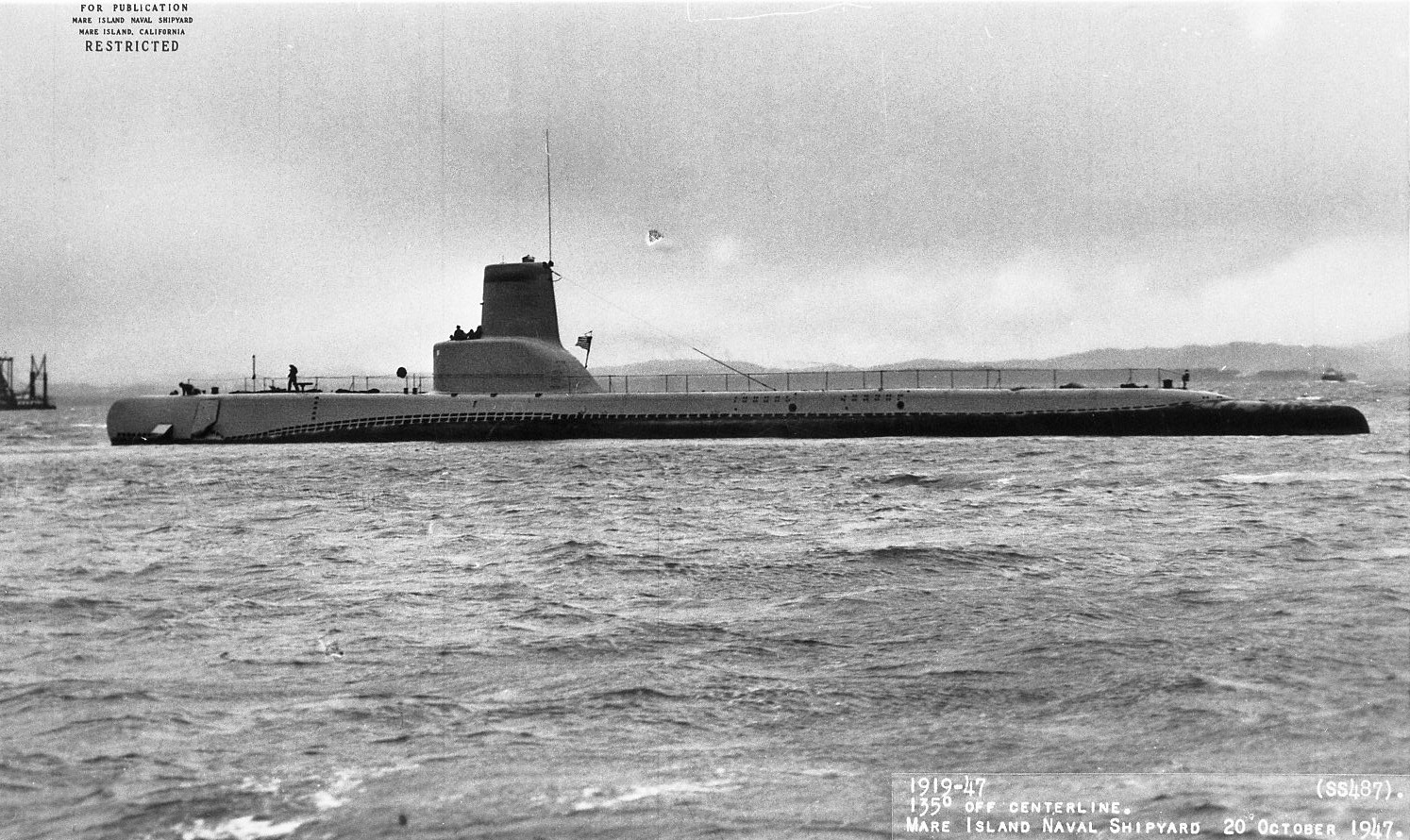
- USS Remora after Greater Underwater Propulsive Power Program (GUPPY-II) conversion.

History

United States
- Name: Remora
- Namesake: Remora
- Builder: Portsmouth Naval Shipyard, Kittery, Maine
- Laid down: 5 March 1945
- Launched: 12 July 1945
- Sponsored by: Mrs. T. W. Samuels III
- Commissioned: 3 January 1946
- Decommissioned: 29 October 1973
- Stricken: 29 October 1973
- Identification: SS-487
- Fate: Transferred to Greece, 29 October 1973

Greece
- Name: Katsonis
- Acquired: 29 October 1973
- Decommissioned: 31 March 1993
- Identification: S-115

General characteristics (As completed)
- Class & type: Tench-class diesel-electric submarine
- Displacement: 1,570 long tons (1,600 t) surfaced; 2,414 tons (2,453 t) submerged
- Length: 311 ft 8 in (95.00 m)
- Beam: 27 ft 4 in (8.33 m)
- Draft: 17 ft (5.2 m) maximum
- Propulsion: 4 × Fairbanks-Morse Model 38D8-⅛ 10-cylinder opposed piston diesel engines driving electrical generators; 2 × 126-cell Sargo batteries; 2 × low-speed direct-drive Elliott electric motors; two propellers; 5,400 shp (4.0 MW) surfaced; 2,740 shp (2.0 MW) submerged
- Speed: 20.25 knots (38 km/h) surfaced; 8.75 knots (16 km/h) submerged
- Range: 11,000 nautical miles (20,000 km) surfaced at 10 knots (19 km/h)
- Endurance: 48 hours at 2 knots (3.7 km/h) submerged; 75 days on patrol
- Test depth: 400 ft (120 m)
- Complement: 10 officers, 71 enlisted
- Armament: 10 × 21-inch (533 mm) torpedo tubes; (6 forward, 4 aft); 28 torpedoes; 1 × 5-inch (127 mm) / 25 caliber deck gun; Bofors 40 mm and Oerlikon 20 mm cannon

General characteristics (Guppy II)
- Displacement: 1,870 tons (1,900 t) surfaced; 2,440 tons (2,480 t) submerged
- Length: 307 ft (94 m)
- Beam: 27 ft 4 in (8.33 m)
- Draft: 17 ft (5.2 m)
- Propulsion: Snorkel added; Batteries upgraded to GUPPY type, capacity expanded to 504 cells (1 × 184 cell, 1 × 68 cell, and 2 × 126 cell batteries)
- Speed: Surfaced: 18.0 knots (33.3 km/h) maximum; 13.5 knots (25.0 km/h) cruising; Submerged: 16.0 knots (29.6 km/h) for ½ hour; 9.0 knots (16.7 km/h) snorkeling; 3.5 knots (6.5 km/h) cruising
- Range: 15,000 nmi (28,000 km) surfaced at 11 knots (20 km/h)
- Endurance: 48 hours at 4 knots (7 km/h) submerged
- Complement: 9–10 officers; 5 petty officers; 70 enlisted men
- Sensors & processing systems: WFA active sonar; JT passive sonar; Mk 106 torpedo fire control system
- Armament: 10 × 21 inch (533 mm) torpedo tubes; (six forward, four aft ); all guns removed

General characteristics (Guppy III)
- Displacement: 1,975 tons (2,007 t) surfaced; 2,450 tons (2,489 t) submerged
- Length: 321 ft (98 m)
- Beam: 27 ft 4 in (8.33 m)
- Draft: 17 ft (5.2 m)
- Speed: Surfaced: 17.2 knots (31.9 km/h) maximum; 12.2 knots (22.6 km/h) cruising; Submerged: 14.5 knots (26.9 km/h) for ½ hour; 6.2 knots (11.5 km/h) snorkeling; 3.7 knots (6.9 km/h) cruising
- Range: 15,900 nmi (29,400 km) surfaced at 8.5 knots (16 km/h)
- Endurance: 36 hours at 3 knots (6 km/h) submerged
- Complement: 8–10 officers; 5 petty officers; 70-80 enlisted men
- Sensors & processing systems: BQS-4 active search sonar; BQR-2B passive search sonar; BQG-4 passive attack sonar

USS Remora (SS-487), a Tench-class submarine, was the only ship of the United States Navy to be named for the remora.

== Construction and commissioning ==
Remora′s keel was laid down on 5 March 1945 by the Portsmouth Navy Yard in Kittery, Maine. She was launched on 12 July 1945, sponsored by Mrs. T. W. Samuels III, and commissioned on 3 January 1946 with Commander Robert Sellars in command.

== Service history ==
=== Training submarine ===
Completing her Caribbean Sea shakedown in April 1946, Remora operated out of New London, Connecticut, as a training submarine until January 1947. Then transferred to the Pacific, she transited the Panama Canal at mid-month and arrived at Mare Island, Vallejo, California, on 14 February to begin a Greater Underwater Propulsive Power Program (GUPPY-II) conversion. Early in November, she completed trials and on 22 February arrived at San Diego, California, her new homeport.

=== Eastern Pacific ===
For the next two years, she remained in the eastern Pacific operating primarily off California, but during the summer and early fall of 1948, ranged as far north as the Aleutian Islands. On 1 May 1950 she headed west for her first deployment in the Far East. On 8 June she arrived at Sasebo, and on 11 June she shifted to Yokosuka, from which base she conducted anti-submarine warfare (ASW) training exercises with units of Naval Forces Far East. Two weeks later the Korean War began.

A unit of TF 96, Naval Forces Japan Remora patrolled Soya Strait, between Hokkaidō and Sakhalin in late July and early August. Later in the month, she headed back to San Diego. During the next two years she underwent overhaul, provided services for the Line School at Monterey, California, and conducted local training exercises. She returned to the western Pacific in early 1953. Arriving at Buckner Bay on 15 March, she continued on to Japan in April and at mid-month rejoined TF 96. In June she was back in Okinawan waters for patrols and exercises, after which she returned to Yokosuka. On 2 July she headed east, reaching San Diego on 3 August.

After the fighting in Korea ended, Remora remained based at San Diego and through the decade continued to alternate training exercises and patrols in the western Pacific with similar First Fleet operations off the United States West Coast and in Hawaiian waters. She remained in the eastern Pacific during 1956 and 1958, but, during the spring of the latter year, was engaged in extended exercises off Alaska.

=== Pearl Harbor ===
In November 1961, Remora was transferred from San Diego to Pearl Harbor. The following year she underwent a seven-month Greater Underwater Propulsive Power Program (GUPPY-III) conversion which lengthened her hull by 15 feet (5 m) and her conning tower by five feet. Then, in 1963, she was employed to evaluate antisubmarine sonar in Hawaiian waters. In May 1964, she resumed a schedule of annual six-month WestPac deployments which she continued into 1969. Remora was one of the last diesel boats to receive the Navy Unit Commendation for "Meritorious Service for operations during the Summer and Fall of 1967." During a shipyard overhaul in late 1967 early 1968, Engine #1 was removed and replaced with a "Prairie Masker" system designed to mask her engines during snorkeling.

In July 1969, Remora shifted home ports, from Pearl Harbor to Charleston, South Carolina. With the exception of one Mediterranean Sea cruise, from 16 February to 26 June 1970, she continued to operate out of Charleston, along the Atlantic seaboard, in the Caribbean Sea, and in the Gulf of Mexico, until decommissioned 29 October 1973 at Charleston.

=== Greek service ===
After decommissioning from US Navy in 1973, she was transferred to the Hellenic Navy as a sale, and recommissioned Katsonis (S-115). She served until 31 March 1993, when she was decommissioned.
