= USS Quillback =

Submarine of the United States

Coordinates: 32°13′N 133°12′E

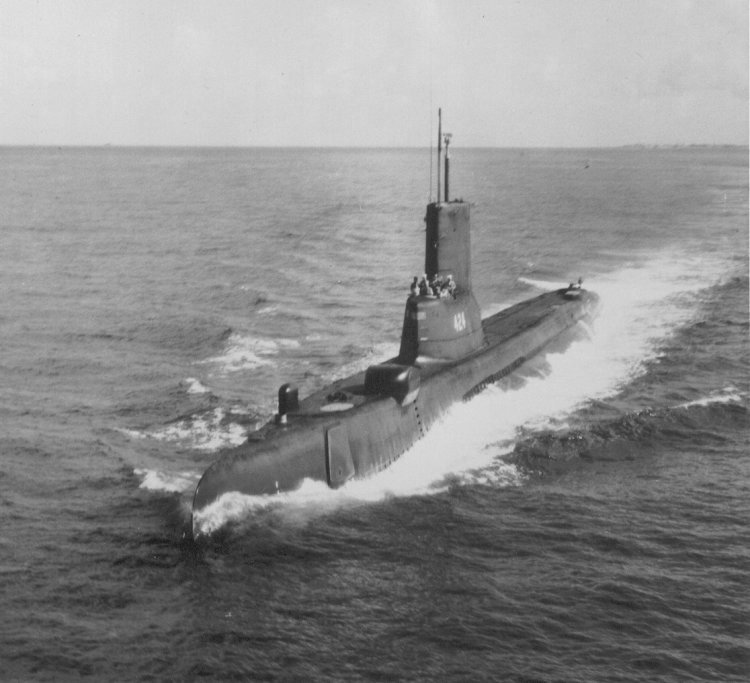
- USS Quillback (SS-424)

History

United States
- Name: Quillback
- Namesake: Quillback
- Builder: Portsmouth Naval Shipyard, Kittery, Maine
- Laid down: 27 June 1944
- Launched: 1 October 1944
- Sponsored by: Mrs. J. A. Tyree, Jr.
- Commissioned: 29 December 1944
- Decommissioned: April 1952
- Recommissioned: 27 February 1953
- Decommissioned: 23 March 1973
- Stricken: 23 March 1973
- Fate: Sold for scrap, 21 March 1974

General characteristics
- Class & type: Tench-class diesel-electric submarine
- Displacement: 1,570 long tons (1,600 t) surfaced; 2,414 tons (2,453 t) submerged
- Length: 311 ft 8 in (95.00 m)
- Beam: 27 ft 4 in (8.33 m)
- Draft: 17 ft (5.2 m) maximum
- Propulsion: 4 × Fairbanks-Morse Model 38D8-⅛ 10-cylinder opposed piston diesel engines driving electrical generators; 2 × 126-cell Sargo batteries; 2 × low-speed direct-drive Elliott electric motors; two propellers; 5,400 shp (4.0 MW) surfaced; 2,740 shp (2.0 MW) submerged
- Speed: 20.25 knots (38 km/h) surfaced; 8.75 knots (16 km/h) submerged
- Range: 11,000 nautical miles (20,000 km) surfaced at 10 knots (19 km/h)
- Endurance: 48 hours at 2 knots (3.7 km/h) submerged; 75 days on patrol
- Test depth: 400 ft (120 m)
- Complement: 10 officers, 71 enlisted
- Armament: 10 × 21-inch (533 mm) torpedo tubes; (6 forward, 4 aft); 28 torpedoes; 1 × 5-inch (127 mm) / 25 caliber deck gun; Bofors 40 mm and Oerlikon 20 mm cannon

General characteristics (Guppy II)
- Displacement: 1,870 tons (1,900 t) surfaced; 2,440 tons (2,480 t) submerged
- Length: 307 ft (94 m)
- Beam: 27 ft 4 in (8.33 m)
- Draft: 17 ft (5.2 m)
- Propulsion: Snorkel added; Batteries upgraded to GUPPY type, capacity expanded to 504 cells (1 × 184 cell, 1 × 68 cell, and 2 × 126 cell batteries)
- Speed: Surfaced: 18.0 knots (33.3 km/h) maximum; 13.5 knots (25.0 km/h) cruising; Submerged: 16.0 knots (29.6 km/h) for ½ hour; 9.0 knots (16.7 km/h) snorkeling; 3.5 knots (6.5 km/h) cruising
- Range: 15,000 nmi (28,000 km) surfaced at 11 knots (20 km/h)
- Endurance: 48 hours at 4 knots (7 km/h) submerged
- Complement: 9–10 officers; 5 petty officers; 70 enlisted men
- Sensors & processing systems: WFA active sonar; JT passive sonar; Mk 106 torpedo fire control system
- Armament: 10 × 21 inch (533 mm) torpedo tubes; (six forward, four aft); all guns removed

USS Quillback (SS-424), a Tench-class submarine, was the only ship of the United States Navy to be named for the quillback, a fish of the sucker family, widespread in the freshwaters of North America and Northern Asia.

Commissioned in December 1944, USS Quillback went on one war patrol in May-July 1945, and was refitting for a second patrol when Japan surrendered on 14 August 1945. She served two periods in commission: 1944-1952 and 1953-1973, for a total of 28 years of active service. USS Quillback was sold for scrap in 1974.

== Construction ==
When her construction by the Portsmouth Navy Yard in Kittery, Maine, was authorized, her name was to be Trembler, which would have made her the first ship named for the trembler, a torpedinoid fish of the West Indies and Brazil, but she was given a less embarrassing name on 7 December 1943.

Her keel was laid down on 27 June 1944. She was launched on 1 October 1944 sponsored by Mrs. J. A. Tyree Jr., and commissioned on 29 December 1944.

== Wartime activities ==
After training at New London, Connecticut, and work on an experimental ordnance project at Key West, Florida, Quillback departed for Pearl Harbor and her maiden war patrol, off the coast of Kyūshū. During this patrol, from 30 May to 24 July 1945, she destroyed a Japanese suicide motorboat and rescued one aviator from the water only a half-mile from the heavily armed shore. When the enemy surrendered, Quillback was refitting for her second patrol at Guam.

== Training activities ==
Peacetime duties returned Quillback to New London for duty as a unit of Submarine Squadron 2. From 1945 to 1951, she operated with the Submarine School in a training capacity and as an experimental unit of the Naval Underwater Sound Laboratory. In April 1951, Quillback departed New London for a six-month tour of duty with the Sixth Fleet in the Mediterranean Sea. In April 1952, she reported to the Portsmouth Naval Shipyard for decommissioning and conversion.

On 27 February 1953, Quillback was recommissioned and joined the Submarine Force, Atlantic Fleet as a streamlined Greater Underwater Propulsive Power Program (GUPPY) Submarine. She reported to ComSubRon 4 at Key West. There in local operations, with occasional trips to Guantanamo Bay, she assisted the Fleet Training Group in Destroyer ASW indoctrination. In 1956, 1957, and 1958, Quillback took part in major fleet and NATO exercises in the North Atlantic.

== Mediterranean deployment ==
In 1959, Quillback was transferred to Submarine Squadron 12. In June 1959, the Quillback sailed the St. Lawrence River, traversed locks, and navigated all of the Great Lakes to reach Chicago in Operation Inland Seas to mark the official opening of the St. Lawrence Seaway. During 1960, she underwent extensive overhaul at Charleston, South Carolina, to improve her offensive capabilities. She deployed to the Mediterranean in October 1961, returning to Key West in February 1962. Operating locally out of Key West from May to October, Quillback was deployed to Guantanamo Bay when the Cuban Quarantine was put into effect and remained there during the first ten days of the Cuban Missile Crisis. During 1963, Quillback operated out of Key West and rendered services to the Fleet Training Group at Guantanamo.

Quillback deployed to the Mediterranean for six months in July 1964. Experimental torpedo research and development projects were assigned to Quillback in 1965 until she deployed to Guantanamo Bay in June. She continued to operate out of Key West until deploying to the Mediterranean again from August to November 1967. She spent most of 1968 and 1969 in the Caribbean.

[1970-1973]

Stricken from the Naval Vessel Register on 23 March 1973, Quillback was sold on 21 March 1974.

== Honors and awards ==
Quillback earned one battle star for World War II service.
