= Tench-class submarine =

US Navy fleet submarine class

- USS Toro shown post-war, after removal of her deck guns, c. 1947.

Class overview
- Builders: Portsmouth Naval Shipyard; Electric Boat Company; Boston Navy Yard
- Operators: United States Navy; Republic of China Navy; Turkish Navy; Hellenic Navy; Peruvian Navy; Pakistan Navy; Royal Canadian Navy; Italian Navy; Brazilian Navy; Bolivarian Navy of Venezuela
- Preceded by: Balao class
- Succeeded by: Barracuda class
- Subclasses: Corsair class
- Built: 1944–1951
- In commission: 1944–present
- Completed: 29
- Canceled: 51
- Active: 1
- Lost: 1
- Retired: 27
- Preserved: 3

General characteristics
- Type: Diesel-electric submarine
- Displacement: 1,570 tons (1,595 t) surfaced; 2,416–2,429 tons (2,455–2468 t) submerged
- Length: 311 ft 8 in – 311 ft 9 in (95.0 m)
- Beam: 27 ft 3 in – 27 ft 4 in (8.3 m)
- Draft: 17 ft (5.2 m) maximum
- Propulsion: 4 × diesel engines driving electrical generators (Fairbanks-Morse or General Motors (Corsair only)); 2 × 126-cell Sargo batteries; 2 × low-speed direct drive electric motors (Elliott Company, General Electric, or Westinghouse); two propellers; 5,400 shp (4,000 kW) surfaced; 2,740 shp (2,040 kW) submerged
- Speed: 20.25 knots (38 km/h) surfaced; 8.75 knots (16 km/h) submerged
- Range: 11,000 nautical miles (20,000 km) surfaced at 10 knots (19 km/h)
- Endurance: 48 hours at 2 knots (3.7 km/h) submerged; 75 days on patrol
- Test depth: 400 ft (120 m)
- Complement: 10 officers, 71 enlisted
- Armament: 10 × 21-inch (533 mm) torpedo tubes; (6 forward, 4 aft); 28 torpedoes; 1 × 5-inch (127 mm) / 25 caliber deck gun; Bofors 40 mm and Oerlikon 20 mm cannon

Tench-class submarines were a type of submarines built for the United States Navy (USN) between 1944 and 1951. They were an improvement over the preceding Gato and Balao classes, only about 35 to 40 tons larger, but more strongly built and with a slightly improved internal layout. One of the ballast tanks was converted to carry fuel, increasing range from 11,000 to 16,000 nautical miles (20,000 to 30,000 km; 13,000 to 18,000 mi). This improvement was also made on some boats of the previous two classes. Further improvements were made beginning with SS-435, which are sometimes referred to as the Corsair class.

Initial plans called for 80 to be built, and orders eventually were placed for 134 (numbered SS-417 to SS-550), but 105 were cancelled in 1944, 1945, and 1946, when it became apparent that they would not be needed to defeat Japan; a further 12 boats (SS-551 to SS-562) were planned to be ordered in 1945, but orders for these were never placed. Some of these (including numerous units which were cancelled) were allegedly of the Balao design, but official USN publications allot all to the Tench class. The remaining 29 were commissioned between October 1944 (USS Tench (SS-417)) and February 1951 (USS Grenadier (SS-525)). The last submarine of the Tench class, as well as the last submarine to have served during World War II, remaining in service with the USN, was the USS Tigrone (AGSS-419), which was decommissioned on 27 June 1975.

One Tench-class submarine is reportedly still in active service, USS Cutlass (SS-473), which was transferred to the Republic of China Navy in 1973. ROCS Hai Shih (S 791) is expected to remain in service until 2026, 82 years after she was first launched in 1944.

Three Tench-class boats survive as museum ships; USS Torsk (SS-423) and USS Requin (SS-481) are in the United States, and USS Thornback (SS-418), renamed TCG Uluçalireis (S 338), is in Turkey.

== Design ==
The as-built diesel-electric propulsion layout was the same as the last few boats of the Balao class, with four Fairbanks-Morse or General Motors Cleveland Division two-stroke diesel engines supplying two low-speed, double-armature, direct-drive electric motors to drive two shafts. All except Corsair received the Fairbanks-Morse 38D 8-1/8 engine with 10 cylinders; Corsair had GM 16-278A engines. The direct-drive electric motors were much quieter than the reduction gear arrangement of previous classes, and they made the drive train much more reliable because the gearing was an element prone to shock damage from depth charges. Two 126-cell Sargo-type lead-acid batteries provided submerged power to the electric motors.

A design weakness of earlier classes solved by the Tench redesign was having the ballast tank vent riser pipes pass through the interior of the boat in the forward and after torpedo rooms. These pipes allowed #1 and #7 main ballast tanks (MBTs) (located in the single-hull sections of the boat) to vent air during diving, which allowed water to flood into them from below. The tops of these MBTs formed the walking deck in the interior of both rooms, thus the normal location of the vent valves (the top of the tank) could not be used. The riser pipes allowed the MBTs to vent, but when they were full, these pipes contained water at full submergence pressure inside the torpedo rooms. If these pipes ruptured during depth charge attack, catastrophic flooding would occur. Solving this problem initially proved quite difficult, but ultimately required the complete rearrangement of the MBTs. The #1 MBT was moved to a location forward of the end of the pressure hull, thus allowing it to vent directly into the superstructure like the rest of the MBTs. This move eliminated the riser pipes completely. The #7 MBT, after stability and buoyancy calculations were run, was found to be redundant and was converted to a variable fuel oil/ballast tank, increasing the class's surfaced range. These changes forced a rearrangement of the associated piping runs and locations of many of the other tanks. Being almost entirely internal, these changes resulted in a boat that was visually almost indistinguishable from the earlier Balao class, with the exception of a sharper angle (or knuckle) at the lower corner of the bow (only visible when the boat was drydocked). Another difference was the elimination of small bulges around the motor room that previously accommodated the reduction gears.

A significant benefit of the tank rearrangement was that these boats could carry two additional torpedoes for the lower bow tubes in the forward torpedo room, giving a total of 26 torpedoes carried. Later, this was increased again with two additional torpedoes for the bottom stern tubes in the aft torpedo room, for a total of 28 torpedoes carried. Submarine crews had been asking for more torpedoes, but this could not be accommodated in the previous classes, as the vent risers restricted the available space.

=== Torpedoes ===
At the beginning of World War II, the standard torpedo for US fleet submarines was the 21-inch Mark 14 torpedo. As the war progressed, the USN introduced the electric, wakeless Mark 18 Torpedo and the Mark 23 torpedo, a simplified, high-speed-only version of the Mark 14. Additionally, a small, 19-inch swim-out, acoustic-homing Mark 27 torpedo supplemented the armament in fleet boats for defense against escorts. Near the end of the war, the offensive Mark 28 acoustic-homing torpedo was introduced. Well after the war, the Mark 37 Torpedo was introduced.

=== Deck guns ===
Many targets in the Pacific War were sampans or otherwise not worth a torpedo, so the deck gun was an important weapon. Due to war experience, most Tench-class boats were armed with a 5-inch (127 mm)/25 caliber gun, and some boats had two of these. Additional antiaircraft guns included single 40mm Bofors and twin 20mm Oerlikon mounts, usually one of each.

=== Mine armament ===
Like the previous Tambor/Gar, Gato, and Balao classes, the Tench class could substitute mines in place of torpedoes. For the Mk 10- and Mk 12-type mines used in World War II, each torpedo could be replaced by as many as two mines, giving the submarine a true maximum capacity of 56 mines. However, doctrine was to retain at least four torpedoes on mine-laying missions, which further limits the capacity. The maximum is often stated as 40 mines in various publications because the authors simply used previous limitations of the Gato and Balao classes and included the four-torpedo doctrine. In practice during the war, submarines went out with at least eight torpedoes, and the largest minefields laid were 32 mines. After the war, the Mk 49 mine replaced the Mk 12, while the larger Mk 27 mine was also carried, which only allowed one mine replacing one torpedo. This mine could be set to travel 1000 to 5000 yards from the boat before deploying (not to be confused with the Mk 27 homing torpedo).

== Boats in class ==
In all, 29 of these boats were built during and after World War II, commissioned from October 1944 through February 1951, with 11 postwar commissions. None of this class was lost in World War II.

With one exception, these boats were all built at government-owned shipyards - Portsmouth Naval Shipyard and Boston Navy Yard. Two boats, USS Wahoo (SS-516) and an unnamed boat designated SS-517, were laid down at Mare Island Navy Yard but canceled and broken up prior to completion. With the end of the war obviously near and due to a large construction backlog of Balao-class boats, the Electric Boat Company was only awarded contracts for three Tench-class boats, only one of which, Corsair, was completed. Electric Boat's follow-on yard, the Manitowoc Shipbuilding Company of Manitowoc, Wisconsin, worked through its contracts for Balaos and was not awarded any Tench contracts. The Cramp Shipbuilding Company of Philadelphia, struggling with workforce problems and supply issues with its Balaos, was also not awarded any contracts.

=== Cancellations ===
In total, 125 U.S. submarines were cancelled during World War II; all but three between 29 July 1944 and 12 August 1945. The three exceptions were USS Wahoo (SS-516), Unicorn (SS-436), and Walrus (SS-437), cancelled on 7 January 1946. References vary considerably as to how many of these were Balao- and how many were Tench-class boats. Some references simply state all submarines numbered from SS-416 onwards were of the Tench class; the Dictionary of American Naval Fighting Ships (Volume 1, published in 1959 by the US Navy Department) confirms this; however, Trumpetfish (SS-425) and Tusk (SS-426) were allegedly completed as Balaos. There were also 10 earlier cancelled Balaos, SS-353 to SS-360, SS-379 and SS-380. The Register of Ships of the U. S. Navy differs, considering every submarine not specifically ordered as a Tench to be a Balao, and further projecting SS-551 to SS-562 as a future class. This yields 62 cancelled Balao-, 51 cancelled Tench-, and 12 cancelled "SS-551"-class boats. Two of the cancelled Tench-class boats, Unicorn and Walrus, were launched incomplete in 1946 and never commissioned, but listed with the reserve fleet until struck in 1958 and scrapped in 1959. The cancelled hull numbers, including those launched incomplete, were SS-353 to SS-360 (Balao), 379 and 380 (Balao), 427–434 (Tench or Balao), 436–437 (Tench), 438–474 (Tench or Balao), 491–521 (Tench), 526-529 (Tench), 530–536 (Tench or Balao), 537-550 (Tench), and 551-562 (Tench or a possible future class, but for which no orders were actually placed).

== Service ==
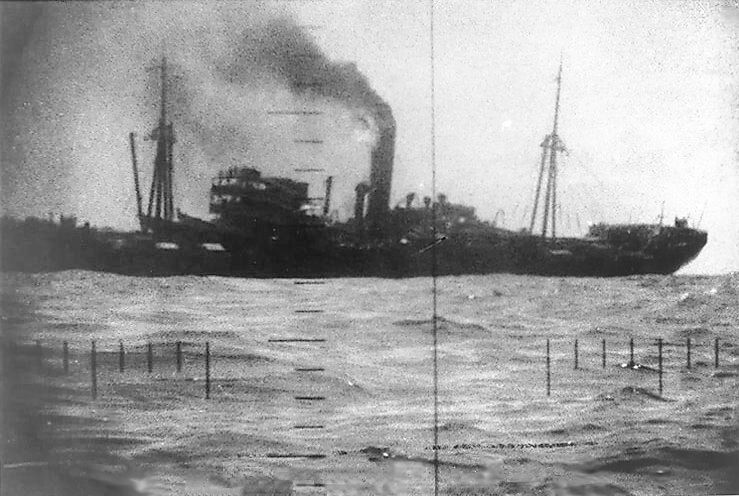
Periscope photo of Japanese merchant ship sinking

Ten of the 29 Tench-class submarines completed were in time to conduct war patrols in World War II, entering service beginning in late 1944. They finished what the previous classes had largely accomplished, the near-total destruction of the Japanese merchant fleet. Another significant contribution was the rescue of downed aviators near Okinawa and Japan. Two additional boats (Cutlass and Diablo) entered Japanese waters on their first war patrols immediately after the 13 August 1945 cease fire. Construction on the last four of the class was suspended, and they were completed 1948–1951.

After the war, 24 of the 29 Tench-class boats were modernized under the Fleet Snorkel and Greater Underwater Propulsion Power (GUPPY) programs, with most continuing in US service into the early 1970s. Fourteen were transferred to foreign navies for years of additional service, and the former Cutlass remained active in Taiwan's Republic of China Navy as Hai Shih as of July 2021, the last of the class in service with any navy.

=== Naval Reserve trainer ===
Interested in maintaining a ready pool of trained reservists, the Navy assigned at least 58 submarines from 1946 to 1971 to various coastal and inland ports (even in Great Lakes ports such as Cleveland, Detroit, and Chicago), where they served as training platforms during the reservists' weekend drills. At least three Tench-class boats served in this capacity. In this role, the boats were rendered incapable of diving and had their propellers removed. They were used strictly as pierside trainers. These were in commission but classed as "in commission in reserve", thus some were decommissioned and recommissioned on the same day to reflect the change in status.

=== Foreign service ===
The large numbers of relatively modern, but surplus U.S. fleet submarines proved to be popular in sales, loans, or leases to allied foreign navies. Fourteen Tench-class submarines were transferred to foreign navies, most after serving over 25 years in the USN. These included four to Brazil, two each to Turkey and Italy, and one each to Greece, Pakistan, Canada, Venezuela, Peru, and Taiwan. The Tench-class submarine ex-Cutlass was transferred along with the Balao-class ex-Tusk to the Republic of China Navy as Hai Shih and Hai Pao in 1973; as of 2015 they remained in commission as the last US-built, World War II-era submarines in service. Argonaut was sold to the Royal Canadian Navy in 1968, renamed HMCS Rainbow, decommissioned in 1974, and returned to the US for scrapping in 1977. Diablo was leased to the Pakistan Navy in 1963 and then as PNS Ghazi participated in two further wars, finally sinking during a minelaying mission in the Bay of Bengal with the loss of all 92 hands, on 4 December 1971 during the Indo-Pakistani War of 1971. Diablo was thus the last Tench-class submarine to see action.

As of 2020, the Taiwanese Hai Shih-class had largest weapons load of any conventional submarines in the world.

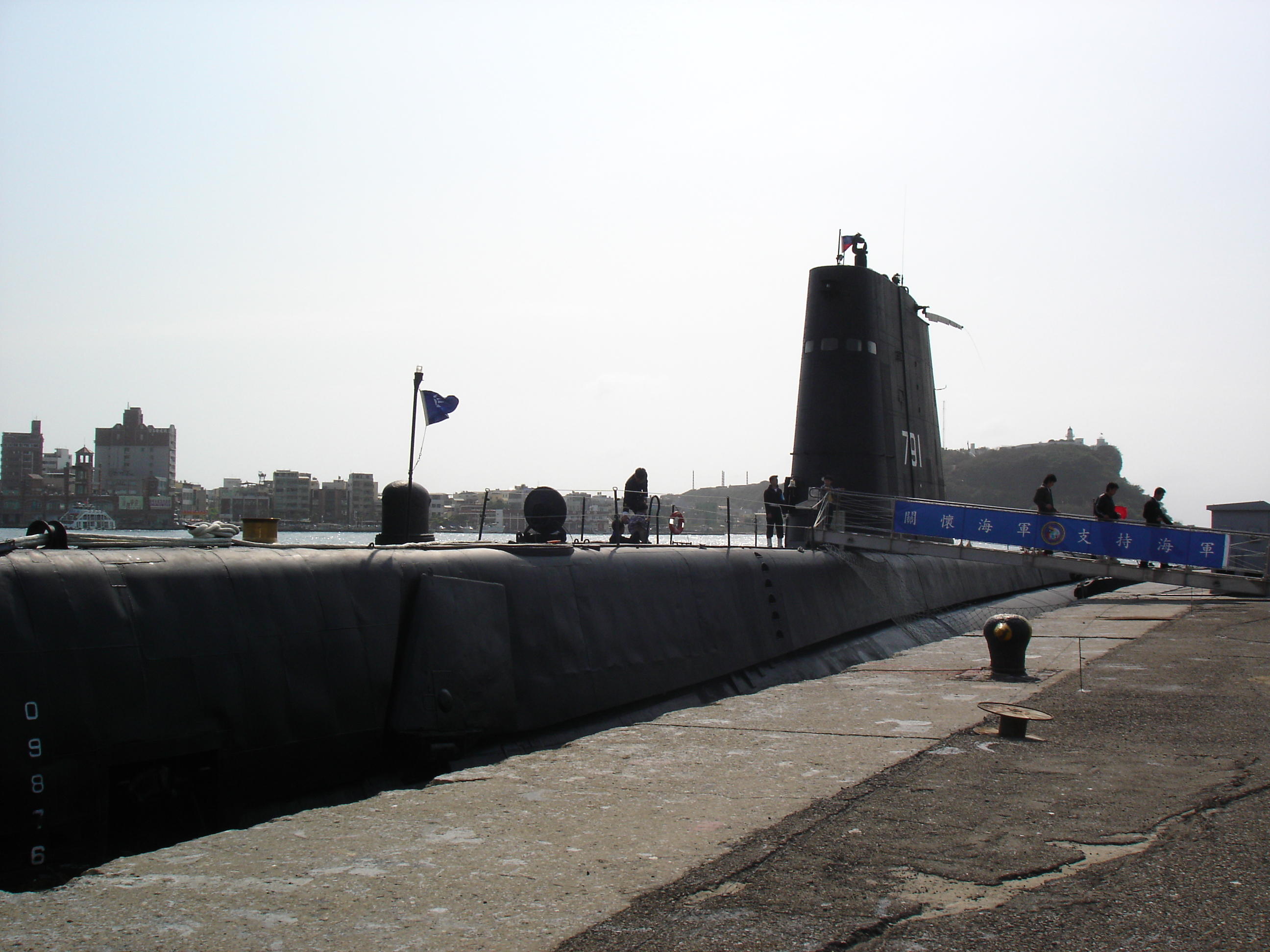
Taiwanese Hai Shih ex-Cutlass still in service

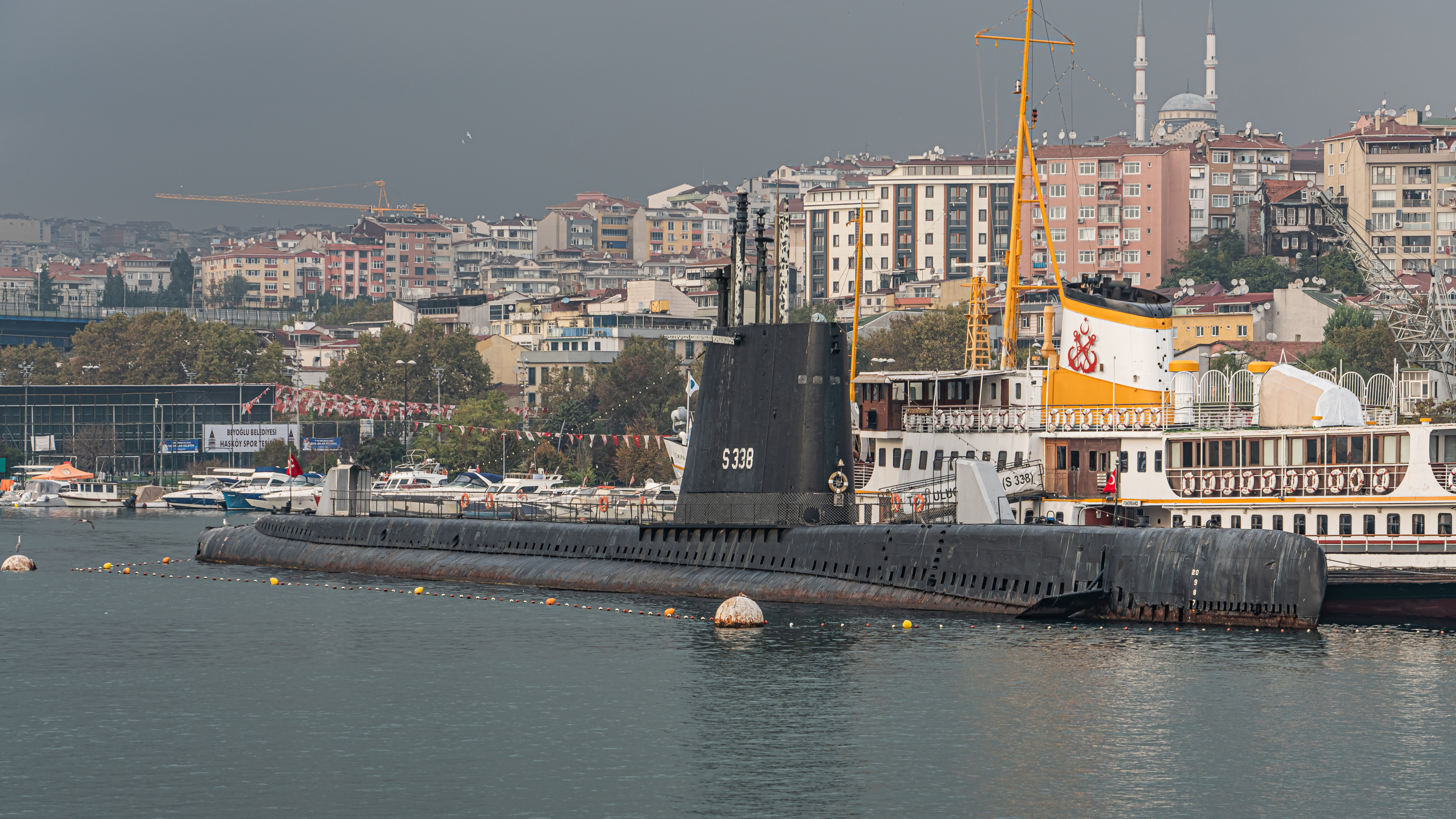
Turkish TCG Uluçalireis moored at the Rahmi M. Koç Museum on the Golden Horn in Istanbul

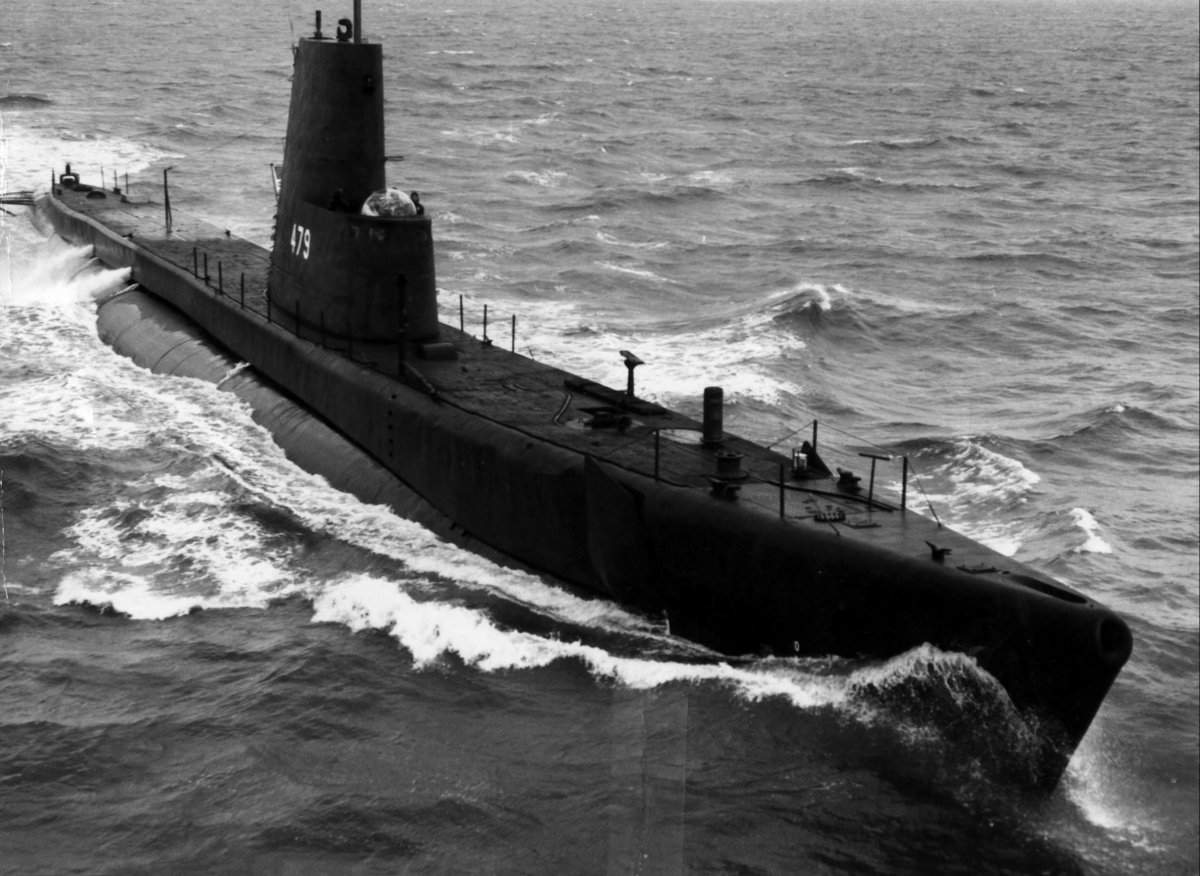
PNS Ghazi

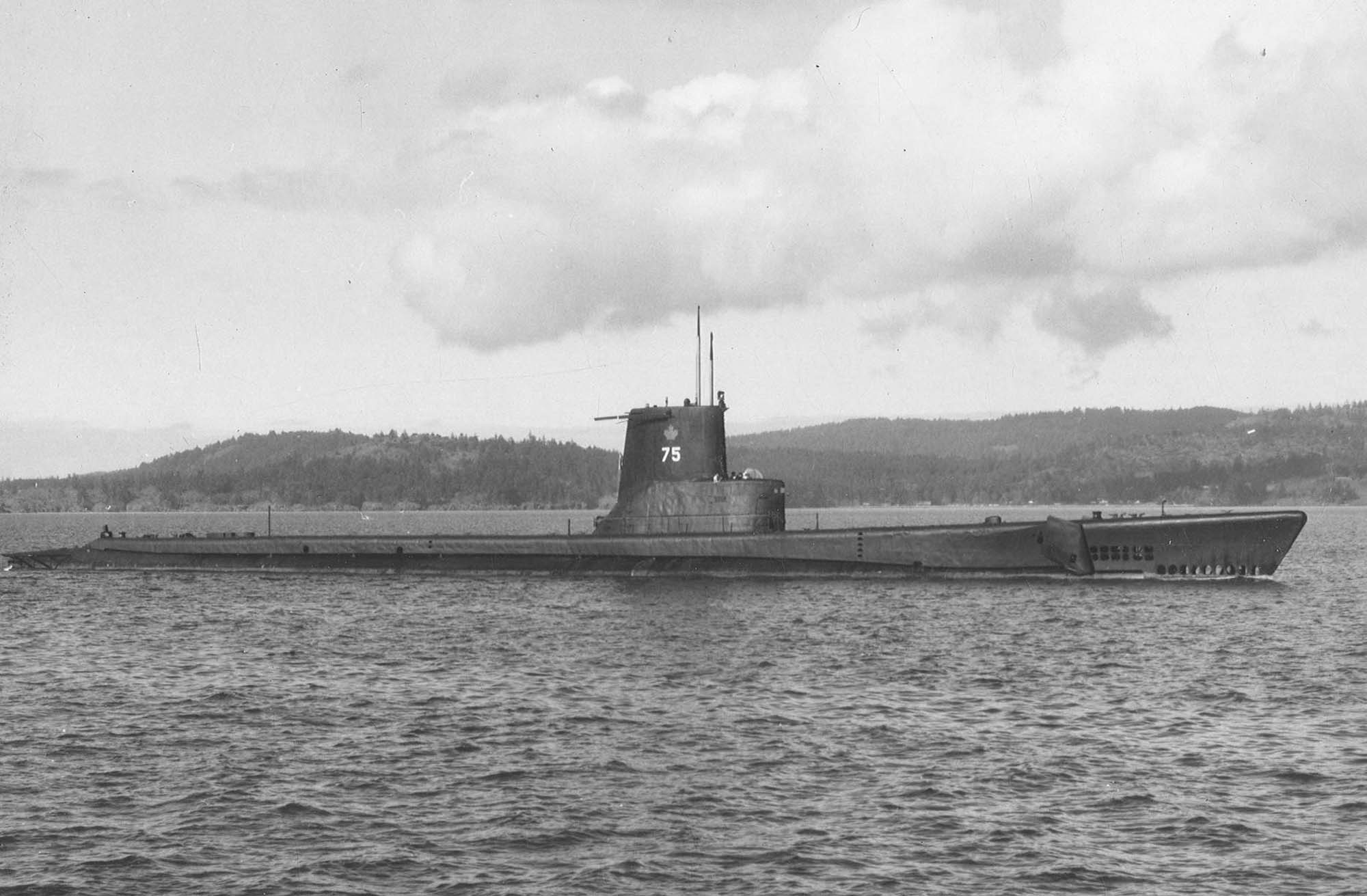
HMCS Rainbow

== GUPPY and other conversions ==
At the end of World War II, the US submarine force found itself in an awkward position. The 29 Tench-class submarines, designed to fight an enemy that no longer existed, were obsolescent despite the fact they were only one to three years old. The German Type XXI U-boat, with a large battery capacity, streamlining to maximize underwater speed, and a snorkel, was the submarine of the immediate future. The GUPPY conversion program was developed to give some Balao- and Tench-class submarines similar capabilities to the Type XXI. When the cost of upgrading numerous submarines to GUPPY standard became apparent, the austere "Fleet Snorkel" conversion was developed to add snorkels and partial streamlining to some boats. In total, 16 Tench-class submarines were converted to one of the GUPPY configurations, with eight additional boats receiving Fleet Snorkel modifications. Diablo, one of the Fleet Snorkel boats, was converted immediately prior to transfer to Pakistan. Most of the converted submarines were active into the early 1970s, when many were transferred to foreign navies for further service and others were decommissioned and disposed of.

Although some variation occurred in the GUPPY conversion programs, generally the original two Sargo batteries were replaced by four, more-compact Guppy (GUPPY I and II only) or Sargo II batteries via significant reuse of below-deck space, usually including removal of auxiliary diesels. All of these battery designs were of the lead-acid type. This increased the total number of battery cells from 252 to 504; the downside was the compact batteries had to be replaced every 18 months instead of every 5 years. The Sargo II battery was developed as a lower-cost alternative to the expensive Guppy battery. All GUPPYs received a snorkel, with a streamlined sail and bow. Also, the electric motors were upgraded to the direct-drive double-armature type, along with modernized electrical and air conditioning systems. All Tench-class GUPPYs received sonar, fire-control, and electronic support measures upgrades. The Fleet Snorkel program was much more austere than the GUPPY modernizations, but is included here as it occurred during the GUPPY era. The GUPPY and Fleet Snorkel programs are listed in chronological order: GUPPY I, GUPPY II, GUPPY IA, Fleet Snorkel, GUPPY IIA, GUPPY IB, and GUPPY III.

=== GUPPY I ===
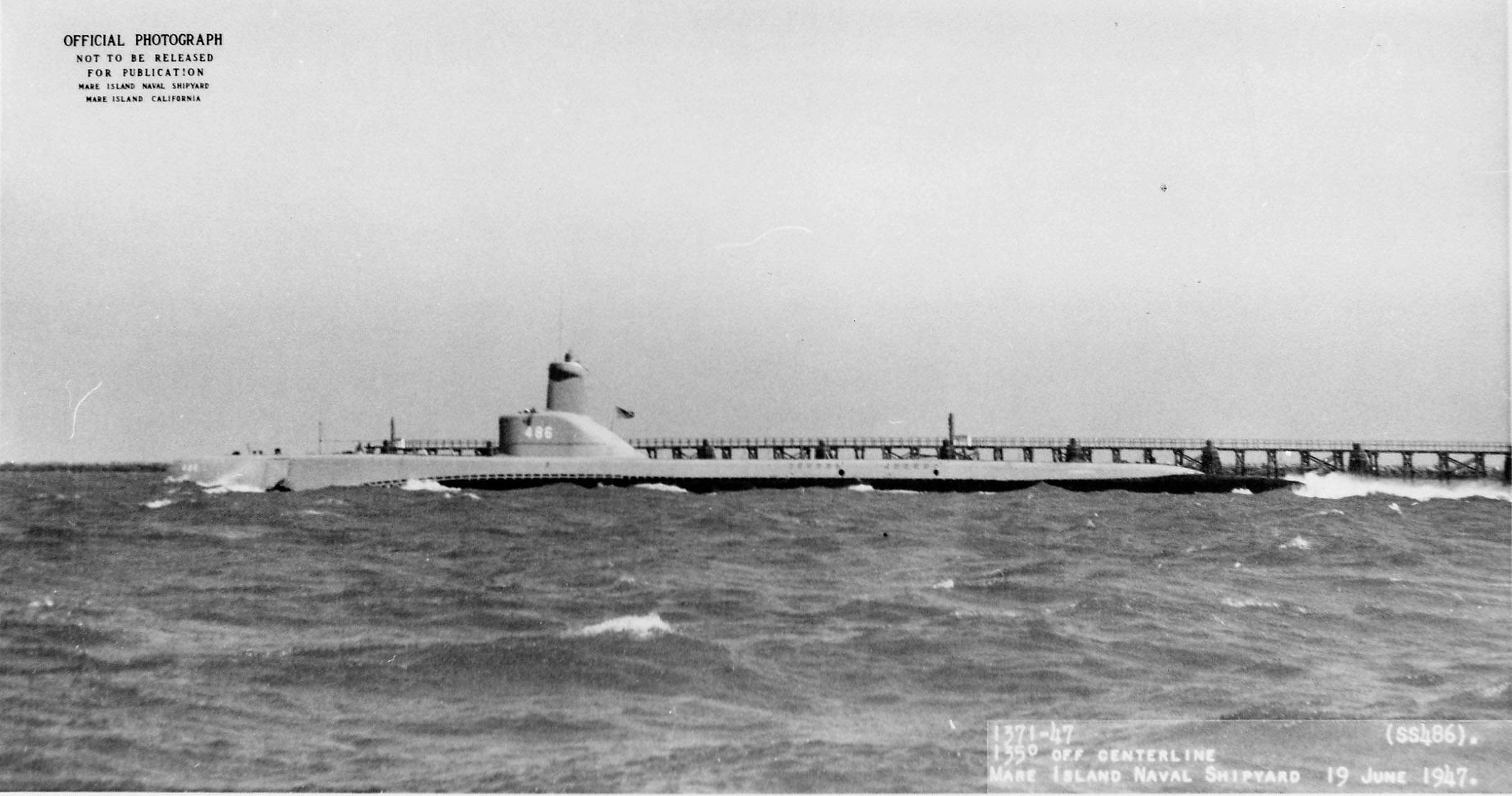
Pomodon in GUPPY I configuration.

Two Tench-class boats, Odax and Pomodon, were converted as prototypes for the GUPPY program in 1947. They proved very successful, though not initially fitted with snorkels. Pomodon achieved 17.9 knots (33.2 km/h; 20.6 mph) while Odax made 18.2 Knots submerged on trials, though even the increased battery capacity only allowed one hour of operation at that speed. However, banking and depth control problems resulting from the high speed were noted and eventually compensated for. An advantage of streamlining was that active sonar detection range against a GUPPY was reduced by about 10%, and the higher submerged speed also severely impacted anti-submarine warfare efforts.

=== GUPPY II ===
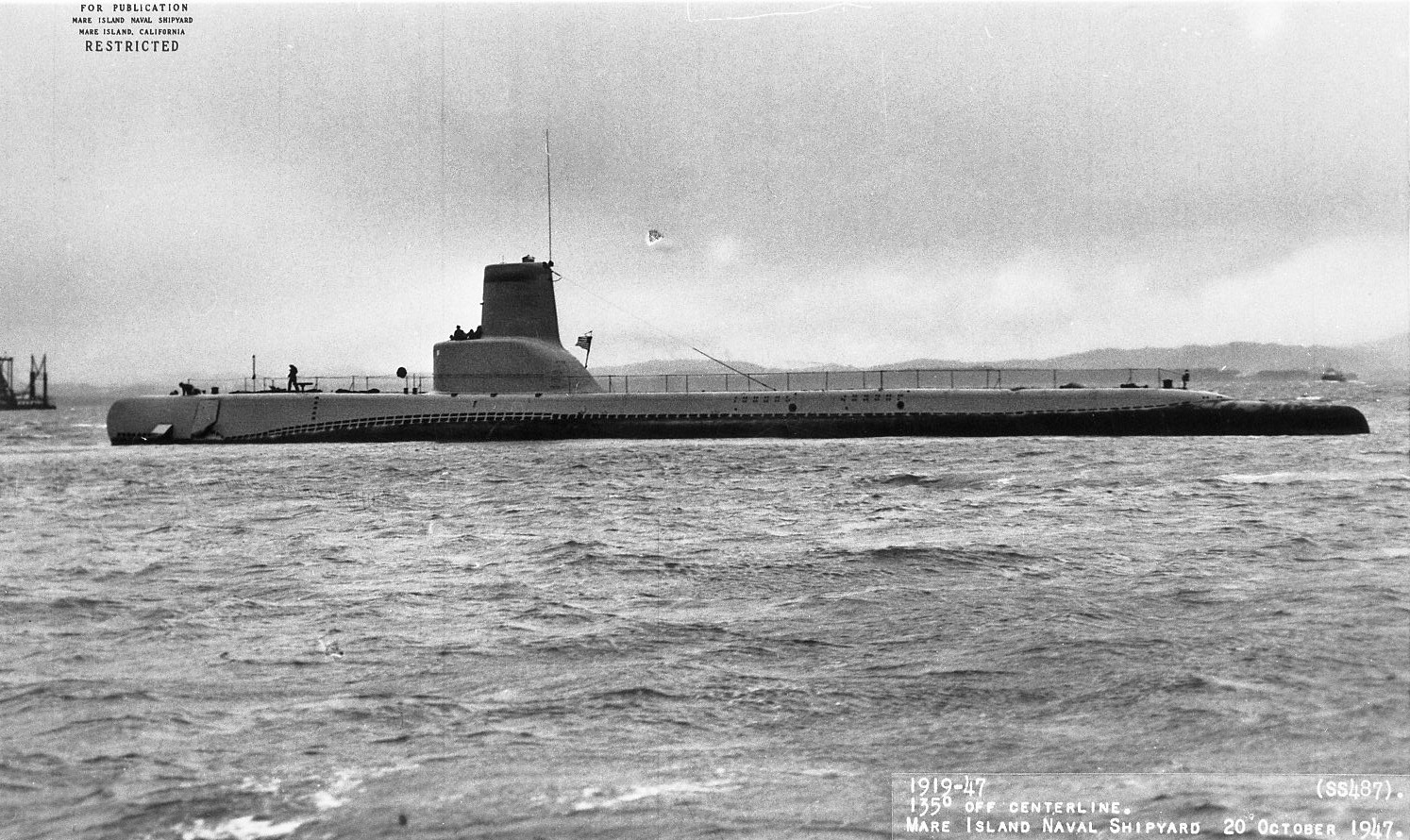
USS Remora (SS-487)

This was the first production GUPPY conversion, with most conversions occurring in 1947–49. Eleven Tench-class boats received GUPPY II upgrades (Amberjack, Cutlass, Grampus, Grenadier, Odax, Pickerel, Pomodon, Remora, Sea Leopard, Sirago, and Volador), including the two GUPPY I prototypes in 1951. This was the only production conversion with Guppy batteries.

=== GUPPY IA ===
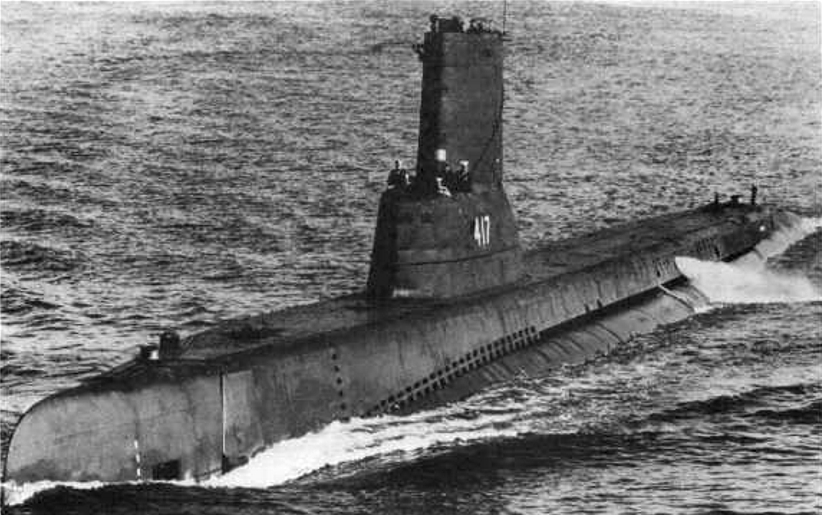
Tench in GUPPY IA configuration

This was developed as a more cost-effective alternative to GUPPY II. Tench was converted in 1951. The less expensive Sargo II battery was introduced, along with other cost-saving measures.

=== Fleet Snorkel ===
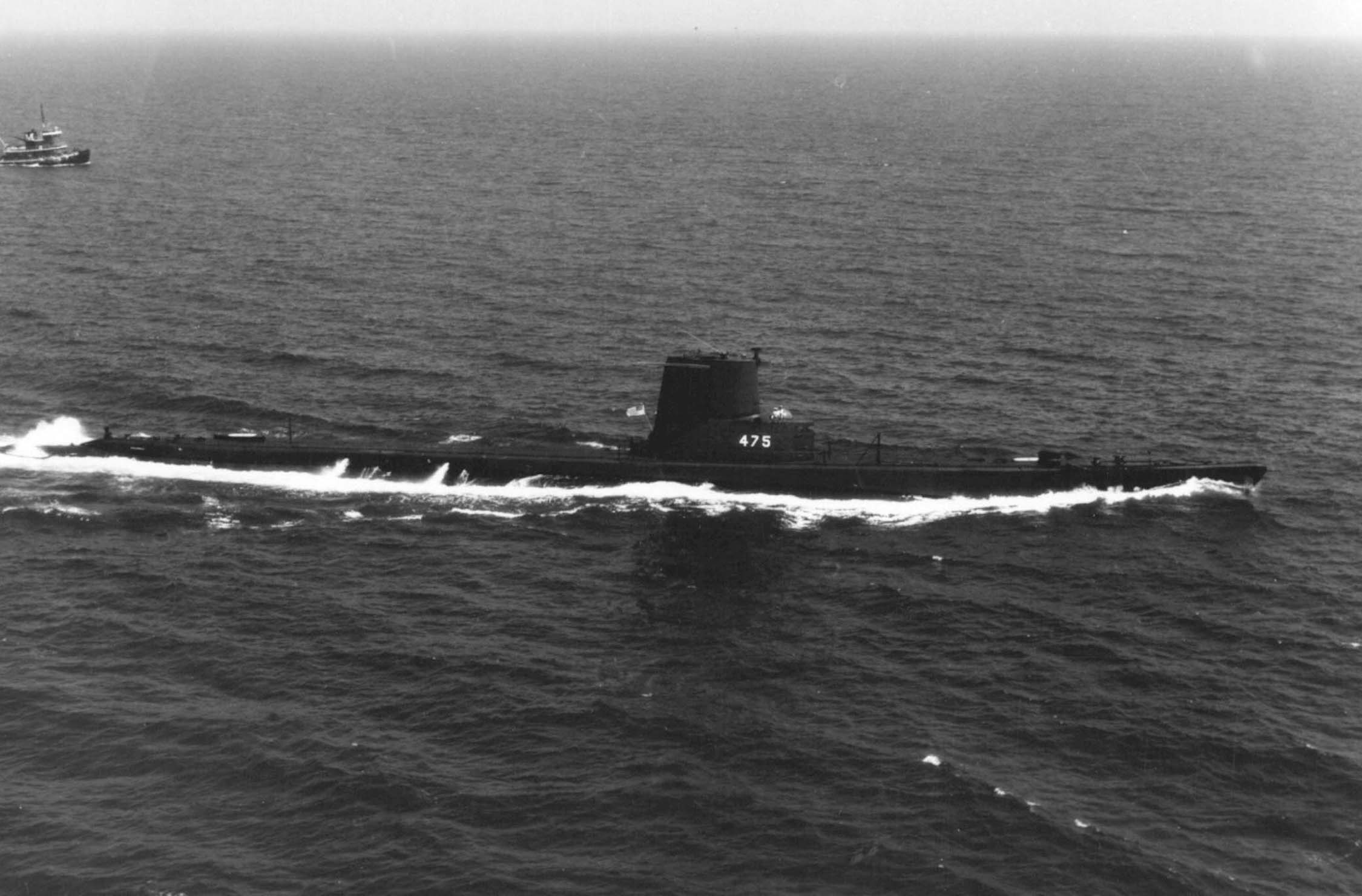
Argonaut in Fleet Snorkel configuration

The Fleet Snorkel program was developed as an austere, cost-effective alternative to full GUPPY conversions, with significantly less improvement in submerged performance. Eight Tench-class boats received this upgrade (Argonaut, Diablo - immediately prior to foreign transfer to Pakistan as Ghazi, Irex, Medregal, Requin, Runner, Spinax, and Torsk). Most Fleet Snorkel conversions occurred 1951–52. Notably, the original pair of Sargo batteries was not upgraded. Each boat received a streamlined sail with a snorkel, along with upgraded sonar, air conditioning, and ESM. A few boats initially retained a 5-inch/25 caliber deck gun, but this was removed in the 1950s.

=== GUPPY IIA ===
This was generally similar to GUPPY IA, except one of the forward diesel engines was removed to relieve machinery overcrowding. Four Tench-class boats (Quillback, Thornback, Tirante, and Trutta) received GUPPY IIA upgrades in 1952–54.

=== GUPPY IB ===
This was developed as an austere upgrade for two Gato-class and two Balao-class boats prior to transfer to foreign navies ( 2 each to Italy and The Netherlands ) in 1953–55. They lacked the sonar and electronics upgrades of other GUPPY conversions. No Tench-class boats were converted under this upgrade.

=== GUPPY III ===
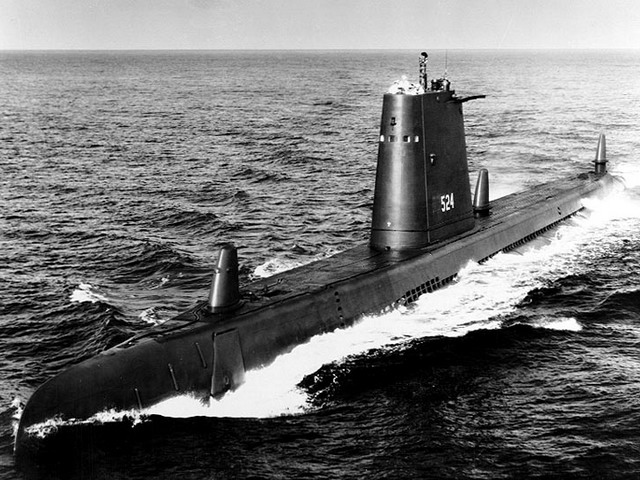
Pickerel in GUPPY III configuration.

Nine submarines, three of them belonging to the Tench class (Pickerel, Remora, and Volador), were upgraded from GUPPY II to GUPPY III in 1959–63 as part of the Fleet Rehabilitation and Modernization II (FRAM II) program. The three Tenches were lengthened by 15 feet (4.6 m) in the forward part of the control room to provide a new sonar space, berthing, electronics space, and storerooms. A taller "Northern" sail was included for improved surfaced operations in rough seas; this was also backfitted to some other GUPPY and Fleet Snorkel boats. The BQG-4 Passive Underwater Fire Control Feasibility Study (PUFFS) sonar system, with three tall "Shark fin" domes topside, was fitted. Additionally, fire control upgrades allowed the Mark 45 nuclear torpedo to be used.

=== Radar picket ===
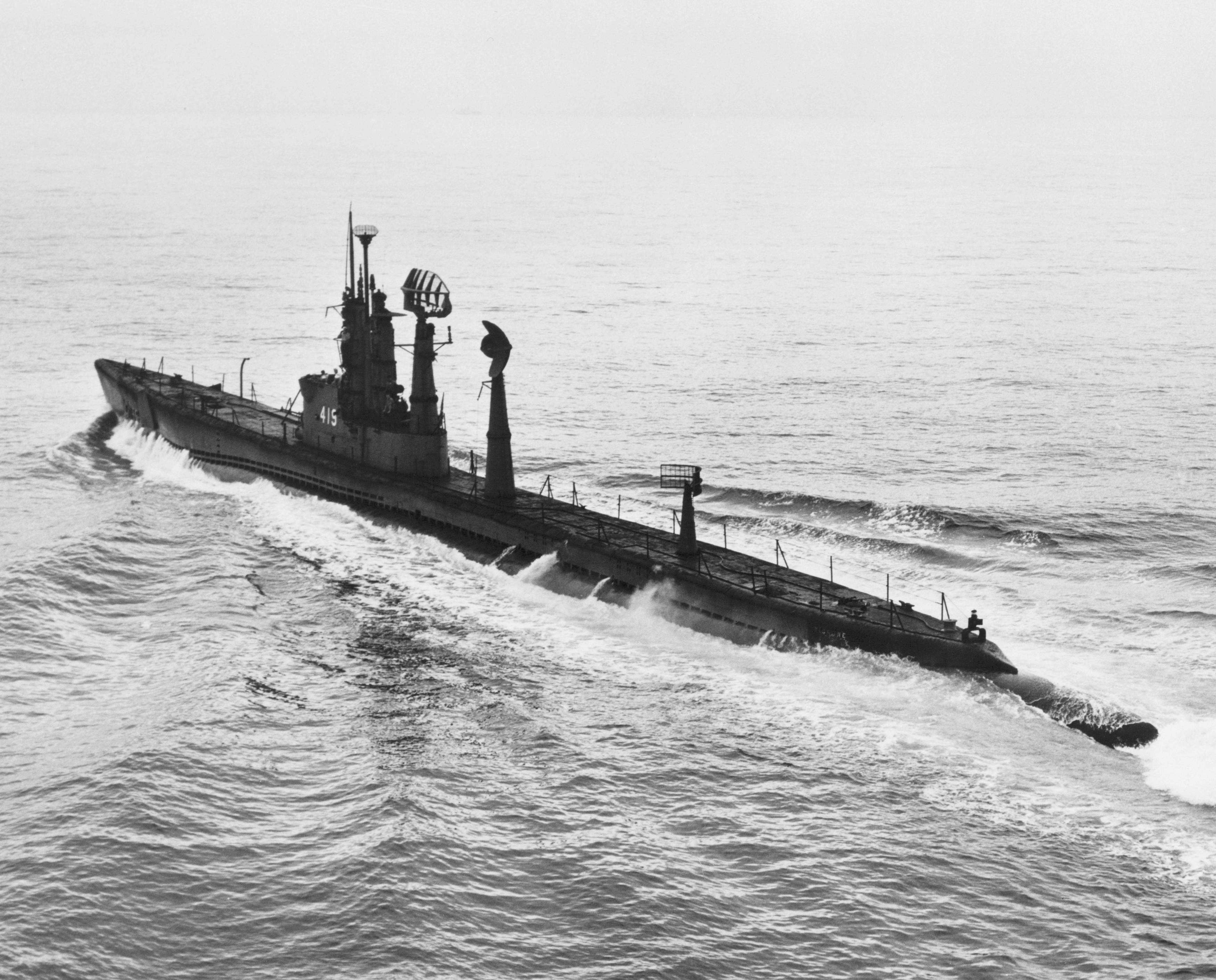
USS Tigrone

The advent of the kamikaze demonstrated the need for a long range radar umbrella around the fleet. Radar picket destroyers and destroyer escorts were put into service, but they proved vulnerable in this role as they could be attacked as well, leaving the fleet blind. A submarine, though, could dive and escape aerial attack. Four submarines including the Tench-class boat Remora prototyped the concept at the end of World War II but were not used in this role. Ten fleet submarines were later converted for this role in 1946–53 and redesignated SSR as radar picket submarines. Three Tench-class boats (Requin, Spinax, and Tigrone) were among those converted, the first two in 1946 under Project Migraine I. Tigrone would be converted under Migraine II (aka project SCB 12) in 1948, and the other two would be upgraded to this standard with powerful air search and height finding radars installed on masts, and with the after torpedo room converted into an electronics space with torpedoes and tubes removed.

The SSRs proved only moderately successful, as the radars themselves proved troublesome and somewhat unreliable, and the boats' surface speed was insufficient to protect a fast-moving carrier group. The radars were removed and the boats reverted to general purpose submarines after 1959.

=== Sonar test submarines ===
Conger was fitted with Bottom Reflection Active Sonar System II (BRASS II) sonar equipment in 1961 and was redesignated as an auxiliary submarine (AGSS) in 1962. BRASS II led to the sonar sphere used on the Thresher class and all subsequent US attack submarines.

Tigrone, formerly a radar picket submarine, was redesignated as an AGSS and converted to a sonar test submarine in 1963–64. She was given a unique configuration to test developmental sonar for the Naval Underwater Sound Laboratory. This included the removal of all torpedoes and tubes to allow room for sonar-related electronics. A large upper bow sonar dome and a forward extension of the sail were included, with a side-facing square sonar rack eventually added aft of the sail. The bow and sail domes were for BRASS III equipment.

== Follow-on studies ==
In late 1944, the Bureau of Ships consulted with a group of submarine officers chaired by COMSUBPAC Admiral Charles A. Lockwood on specifications for a future submarine. Several designs were considered. The submarine officers wanted a deeper test depth, more torpedo tubes, and a higher speed, but got only part of what they wanted. The final design merged ambition with realism. Known as Design B, it was developed by May 1945. It was to be 336 ft (102 m) long, 1,960 long tons (1,990 t) surfaced displacement (2,990 long tons (3,040 t) submerged), with larger engines (12-cylinder Fairbanks-Morse with two-stage supercharging) for a speed of 22.5 knots (41.7 km/h; 25.9 mph) surfaced. Armament was to be twelve 21-inch (533 mm) torpedo tubes (six forward, six aft), with six short 21-inch (533 mm) external torpedo tubes in the superstructure for the swim-out 19-inch (483 mm) Mark 27 acoustic homing anti-escort torpedo. The external tubes would be arranged with three each firing to port and starboard. Test depth would be increased to 500 feet (150 m). The wind-down of submarine production in 1945 brought an end to this project. Had SS-551 through SS-562 not been cancelled, it is possible they would have been built to the new design.

== Museums ==
Three Tench-class submarines are on display for the general public.

- USS Requin (SS-481) at the Carnegie Science Center in Pittsburgh, PA.
- USS Torsk (SS-423), moored at Pier Three, Baltimore's Inner Harbor, (alongside the National Aquarium in Baltimore) in Maryland.
- TCG Uluçalireis (S 338) (ex-USS Thornback (SS-418)), on display at Rahmi M. Koç Museum, Golden Horn in Istanbul.

== See also ==
- Allied submarines in the Pacific War
