= USS Corsair (SS-435) =

Submarine of the United States

History

United States
- Name: Corsair
- Namesake: California rockfish & Corsairs
- Builder: Electric Boat Company, Groton, Connecticut
- Laid down: 1 March 1945
- Launched: 3 May 1946
- Commissioned: 8 November 1946
- Decommissioned: 1 February 1963
- Stricken: 1 February 1963
- Fate: Sold for scrap, 8 November 1963

General characteristics
- Class & type: Tench-class diesel-electric submarine
- Displacement: 1,570 tons (1,595 t) surfaced; 2,428 tons (2,467 t) submerged
- Length: 311 ft 9 in (95.02 m)
- Beam: 27 ft 3 in (8.31 m)
- Draft: 17 ft 0 in (5.18 m) maximum
- Propulsion: 4 × General Motors Model 16-278A V16 diesel engines driving electrical generators; 2 × 126-cell Sargo batteries; 2 × low-speed direct-drive double-armature General Electric electric motors; two propellers; 5,400 shp (4.0 MW) surfaced; 2,740 shp (2.0 MW) submerged
- Speed: 20.25 knots (38 km/h) surfaced; 8.75 knots (16 km/h) submerged
- Range: 11,000 nautical miles (20,000 km) surfaced at 10 knots (19 km/h)
- Endurance: 48 hours at 2 knots (3.7 km/h) submerged; 75 days on patrol
- Test depth: 400 ft (120 m)
- Complement: 10 officers, 71 enlisted
- Armament: 10 × 21-inch (533 mm) torpedo tubes; (6 forward, 4 aft); 28 torpedoes; 1 × 5-inch (127 mm) / 25 caliber deck gun; Bofors 40 mm and Oerlikon 20 mm cannon

USS Corsair (hull number SS-435), a Tench-class submarine, was the second ship of the United States Navy to be named for the California rockfish, or a pirate or privateer, especially Turkish or Saracen.

Her keel was laid down by the Electric Boat Company in Groton, Connecticut. She was launched on 3 May 1946 sponsored by Mrs. O. M. Hustvedt, commissioned on 8 November 1946 and reported to the Atlantic Fleet.

Following a shakedown cruise in which she visited Havana, Panama, Trinidad, and Rio de Janeiro, Corsair was assigned to Submarine Squadron 8 and operated out of New London, Connecticut, on type training and provided services to ships of other types until June 1947 when she entered the Electric Boat Company yard for the installation of a new type of sound gear. On 31 July 1947 she sank the old minesweeper Chewink in a torpedo experiment.

From 15 November 1947 Corsair provided services to the Submarine School at New London, cruising to the Caribbean Sea several times, until April 1949 when she was assigned to Submarine Development Group 2. She sailed from New London 18 July with the rest of her group on a cruise which took them to Northern Ireland, Portsmouth in the United Kingdom, and Arctic waters. One of her group, Cochino (SS-345), was lost 26 August from a battery explosion and fire. All but one of the Cochino's crew and six from the Tusk, who were lost in an attempt to bring medical supplies to the stricken Cochino, were rescued by Tusk (SS-426) exhibiting brilliant seamanship in the midst of a violent Arctic storm. The group raced through the storm to land two of the crew at Saint John, New Brunswick, for emergency medical care. Corsair returned to New London on 15 September to continue local operations with the development group. Their duties included providing services to the sound laboratory at Portsmouth, and participating in large-scale submarine exercises, including another in northern waters from 27 October to 24 November 1952 during which they visited Reykjavík, Iceland.

Corsair was detached from the development group, in March 1954, and went into a "reduced complement" status. Continuing to operate out of New London, she provided services to the Submarine School; Commander, Destroyers, Atlantic; and Commander, Air, Atlantic. She also conducted reserve training cruises, participated in Caribbean exercises, and operated with the Fleet Training Group at Guantanamo Bay Naval Base, Cuba. In the summer of 1959, she joined in Operation "Inland Seas," passing through the St. Lawrence Seaway to join in ceremonies dedicating the new waterway and to visit Great Lakes ports. While on the Great Lakes cruise, the Corsair earned the rarest Navy certificate, the "Grand Order of Muskies", which can only be earned by submariners who have submerged in all 5 Great Lakes. She returned to operations from New London. "Corsair" made one last cruise to the Med in 1962.

Corsair was decommissioned on 1 February 1963 and scrapped later that year. Her name plate is on display at the Freedom Park.
