= Elliott Company =

American machinery manufacturer

- Founded: 1901 as Liberty Manufacturing Company, 1910 as Elliott Company
- Founder: William Swan Elliott
- Headquarters: Jeannette, Pennsylvania, United States
- Number of employees: 980
- Website: www.elliott-turbo.com

Elliott Company designs, manufactures, installs, and services turbo-machinery for prime movers and rotating machinery. Headquartered in Jeannette, Pennsylvania, Elliott Company is a wholly owned subsidiary of the Japan-based Ebara Corporation, and is a unit of Elliott Group, Ebara Corporation's worldwide turbomachinery business. Elliott Group employs more than 2000 employees worldwide at 32 locations, with approximately 900 in Jeannette.

== History ==
Founded in 1901 as the Liberty Manufacturing Company to produce boiler cleaning equipment based on the patents of William Swan Elliott, the company incorporated as the Elliott Company in 1910. Elliott Company moved to the former Clifford-Capell Fan Works in Jeannette, Pennsylvania, in 1914 and has maintained a factory and offices there since.

Elliott purchased the Kerr Turbine Company in 1924 and Ridgway Dynamo & Engine Co. in 1926. These acquisitions allowed Elliott to begin manufacturing turbines and compressors and enter the rotating machinery market.

In the 1930s and during World War II, Elliott supplied the United States Navy with some of the electric motors and generators used in fleet submarines under the name Elliott Motor Company. Elliott's entry in the Dictionary of American Naval Fighting Ships shows its name abbreviated as Ell, and may be the source of a common misspelling of the company's name as Elliot. The Elliott company's broader war contribution included turbines, generators, blowers, ejectors, heaters, and other warship and engine parts.

In 1941, Elliott became the first American manufacturer to build a turbocharger for diesel engines. Elliott would go on to produce more than 40,000 diesel turbochargers.

In 1957, the Elliott family sold the company to Carrier Corporation, which, in turn, was sold to United Technologies Corporation in 1979.

In 1962, Elliott developed their Plant-Air-Package (PAP) line of products which was sold to Fusheng Group of Taiwan in 2003, and became the FS-Elliott company (Not affiliated with Elliott Company). FS-Elliott is headquartered in Export Pa.

In 1984, Elliott launched the first of 32 Service Centers located throughout the world. In 1987, the management of the Elliott Company returned the firm to independent operation through a management buyout.

In 2000, Ebara Corporation of Tokyo, Japan, an Elliott licensee, purchased Elliott. Ebara Corporation is a large manufacturing and environmental services corporation whose shares are traded on the Nikkei Stock Exchange.

In 2010, Elliott had its Centennial Celebration, 100 years in the name of Elliott Company, in Jeannette Pennsylvania. The celebration featured free food, games, and tents featuring Elliott history and memorabilia from personal collectors.

== Products ==
Elliott currently designs and builds heavy-duty steam turbines, air and gas compressors, power recovery turbines and power generating equipment. Elliott products are used in oil and gas fields, refineries, chemical processing plants, steel mills, electric generating stations, sugar and paper mills, and various mining operations.

Compressors: Elliott designs and manufactures multi-stage centrifugal air and gas compressors using EDGE technology. They currently offer six different compressor types: M-line, MB-line, MBP-line, P-line, PH-line, and A-line. Each compressor line is engineered to meet varying frame sizes, flow rates, and pressure capacities.

Steam Turbines/Expanders: Elliott offers single-stage, multi-stage, single-valve, and multi-valve turbines ranging from 10 to 100,000 horsepower (75,000 kW) and at varying operational speeds. Elliott also develops power recovery expander turbines used to drive compressors and generators in refinery fluid catalytic-cracking services.

Lube Oil Consoles and Dry Gas Seal Packages: To complement its compressors and turbines, Elliott offers a range of lubrication, seal and piping, and other auxiliary systems. Many consoles are packaged to meet individual customer requirements.

Control Systems: Elliott Digital Control Systems allow for the remote operation of turbo-machinery. Some systems use graphical interfaces to make complex monitoring and control easier.

== Locations ==
Jeannette, Pennsylvania is home to Elliott’s engineering and administration facilities, as well as the company's U.S. manufacturing center. This complex comprises 40 buildings on 102 acres (41 ha). The production capabilities of this facility were increased by 50% through the company's “Factory 2000” initiative.

Outside of the United States: Elliott operates sales and service offices in Canada, Europe, Latin America and South America, the Middle East, and Asia. Its Asia-Pacific manufacturing facility, owned and operated by the Ebara Corporation, is located in Sodegaura, Chiba, Japan and serves customers in Asia, Australia, and the Pacific region.

There is also a Houston, Texas location.
