= Tinkerbelle =

Sailboat

Tinkerbelle by Robert Manry (1967)

Tinkerbelle is a 13.5-foot (4.1 m) sailboat in which 47-year-old newspaperman Robert Manry, a copy editor at the Cleveland Plain Dealer, single-handedly crossed the Atlantic Ocean in 1965. At the time, it was the shortest but not the smallest boat to cross the Atlantic nonstop (till today the smallest is Lindemann's folding kayak). He left Falmouth, Massachusetts on June 1 and arrived in Falmouth, Cornwall, England 78 days later, greeted by an armada of small boats and a huge crowd. Mayor Samuel A. Hooper of Falmouth officially welcomed him at the town's Custom House Quay. Robert Manry's wife Virginia and his children, Robin and Douglas, were also there, having been flown in from Willowick, Ohio.

During the voyage Manry was knocked overboard by big waves, suffered from hallucinations, repaired a broken rudder in mid-ocean, and was woken up one morning by a surfacing submarine, USS Tench (SS-417). Manry later wrote about the voyage and its preparation in his book Tinkerbelle.

Tinkerbelle, a little wooden Old Town "Whitecap" sailboat, was originally built by the Old Town Canoe Co. of Old Town, Maine. Manry extensively modified her himself for the voyage by adding a cabin and more seaworthy cockpit. Tinkerbelle's official registration number painted on her bow was OH 7013 AR.

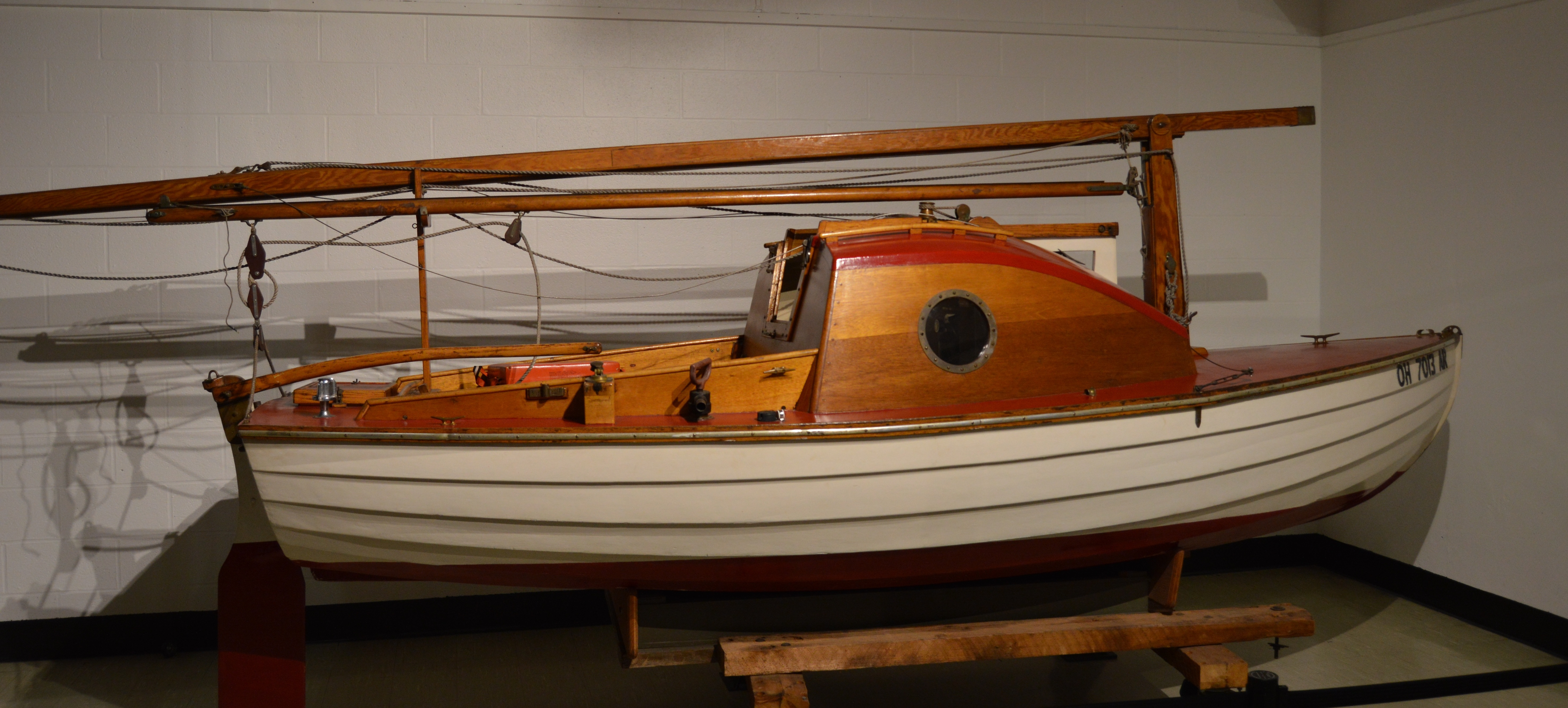
Tinkerbelle in the Crawford Auto Aviation Museum. April 2018

Tinkerbelle is on display indoors at the Crawford Auto-Aviation Museum in Cleveland, Ohio. Nearby the real Tinkerbelle is provided a replica into which children can crawl.

== Bibliography ==
- Tinkerbelle (Harper and Row, New York 1966; Collins, London 1967) OCLC 1497771
