= USS Tench =

Submarine of the United States

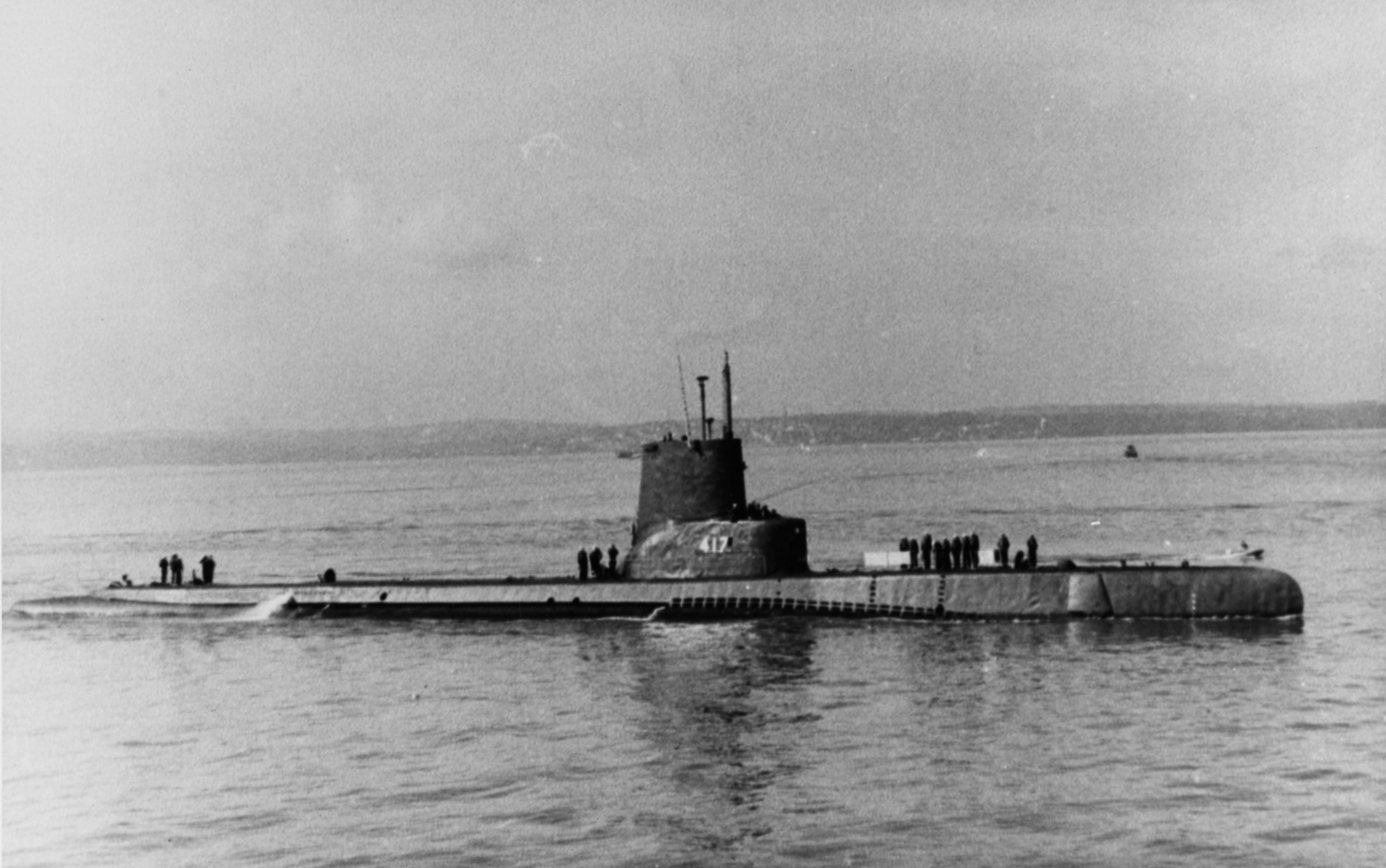
- Tench after her GUPPY conversion.

History

United States
- Name: Tench
- Namesake: Tench
- Builder: Portsmouth Naval Shipyard, Kittery, Maine
- Laid down: 1 April 1944
- Launched: 7 July 1944
- Commissioned: 6 October 1944
- Decommissioned: January 1947
- Recommissioned: October 1950
- Decommissioned: 8 May 1970
- Stricken: 15 August 1973
- Fate: Sold to Peru for spare parts, 16 September 1976

General characteristics (As completed)
- Class & type: Tench-class diesel-electric submarine
- Displacement: 1,570 long tons (1,600 t) surfaced; 2,416 tons (2,455 t) submerged
- Length: 311 ft 8 in (95.00 m)
- Beam: 27 ft 4 in (8.33 m)
- Draft: 17 ft 0 in (5.18 m) maximum
- Propulsion: 4 × Fairbanks-Morse Model 38D8-⅛ 10-cylinder opposed piston diesel engines driving electrical generators; 2 × 126-cell Sargo batteries; 2 × low-speed direct-drive General Electric electric motors; two propellers; 5,400 shp (4.0 MW) surfaced; 2,740 shp (2.0 MW) submerged
- Speed: 20.25 knots (38 km/h) surfaced; 8.75 knots (16 km/h) submerged
- Range: 11,000 nautical miles (20,000 km) surfaced at 10 kn (19 km/h)
- Endurance: 48 hours at 2 knots (3.7 km/h) submerged; 75 days on patrol
- Test depth: 400 ft (120 m)
- Complement: 10 officers, 71 enlisted
- Armament: 10 × 21 inch (533 mm) torpedo tubes (six forward, four aft; 24 torpedoes); one 5 in (130 mm)/25 caliber deck gun; one 40 mm (1.57 in) Bofors antiaircraft cannon; two .50 cal (12.7 mm) machineguns

General characteristics (Guppy IA)
- Displacement: 1,830 tons (1,859 t) surfaced; 2,440 tons (2,479 t) submerged
- Length: 307 ft 7 in (93.75 m)
- Beam: 27 ft 4 in (8.33 m)
- Draft: 17 ft (5.2 m)
- Propulsion: Snorkel added; Batteries upgraded to Sargo II
- Speed: Surfaced: 17.3 knots (32.0 km/h) maximum; 12.5 knots (23.2 km/h) cruising; Submerged: 15.0 knots (27.8 km/h) for ½ hour; 7.5 knots (13.9 km/h) snorkeling; 3.0 knots (5.6 km/h) cruising
- Range: 17,000 nmi (31,000 km) surfaced at 11 kn (20 km/h)
- Endurance: 36 hours at 3 knots (6 km/h) submerged
- Complement: 10 officers; 5 petty officers; 64–69 enlisted men
- Armament: 10 × 21 in (53 cm) torpedo tubes; (six forward, four aft); all guns removed

USS Tench (hull number SS/AGSS-417), the lead ship of her class of submarine, was the only ship of the United States Navy to be named for the tench. Her keel was laid down on 1 April 1944 at the Portsmouth Navy Yard. She was launched on 7 July 1944, sponsored by Claudia Alta Johnson, the wife of Rep. Lyndon Baines Johnson, and commissioned on 6 October 1944 with Commander William B. "Barney" Sieglaff in command.

== First War Patrol ==
After completing trials and shakedown out of New London, Connecticut, Tench departed that port on 20 December for duty in the Pacific. Following brief pauses for training at Key West, Florida, and in the Panama Canal Zone, she reached Pearl Harbor during the latter part of January 1945. An additional training period followed her arrival in Oahu, but only a brief one. On 7 February, she stood out of Pearl Harbor, bound for her first war patrol. After a stop at Saipan for fuel, Tench returned to sea in a four submarine wolf pack with Sea Devil, Balao (like Tench, also the lead ship of a submarine class), and Grouper.

They left Saipan on 27 February and headed for their assigned patrol area which began in the region of the East China Sea southwest of Kyūshū and extended north into the Yellow Sea. On the night of 6 March and 7 March, Tench passed through the Colnett Strait south of Yakushima and into the East China Sea. The four submarines rotated patrol, weather-reporting, photographic-reconnaissance, and lifeguard duties. On 18 March, Tench received orders to take up lifeguard station off the western coast of Kyūshū during Fifth Fleet carrier air raids on Nagasaki. Just before the noon watch came on duty, the submarine got word of a dye marker sighting (presumably evidence of a downed American aviator) sighted by friendly aircraft in a bay on the coast of Kyūshū near the town of Akune.

Under the protective cover of F6F Hellcat fighters, Tench threaded her way cautiously into the shallow waters of the bay. Just after she discovered the "sighting" had been the result of a reflection of a shoal spot, she received a severe fright. Caught in waters too shallow for her to dive, she proceeded almost helplessly on the surface while a large flight of aircraft approached her from astern. Fortunately the planes proved to be additional Fifth Fleet bombers returning from Nagasaki. Tench stood offshore and watched while they loosed their remaining bombs on installations near Akune: a railroad bridge, a fuel dump, and a factory.

The remainder of March proved relatively unproductive. In the absence of targets worthy of torpedoes, the submarine contented herself with the destruction of floating mines and with the sinking of two tiny trawlers on 28 March.

Early on 3 April, an enemy bomber forced her to dive, and she ran submerged for the remainder of the day. That evening, she surfaced once again and soon made radar contact with a good-sized target. The fact the enemy ship carried radar, coupled with the appearance of a second target larger than the first, indicated she was some type of warship escorting a merchantman. Darkness and fog dictated a surface attack. Tench’s report claims the target, the large merchant ship, took one torpedo hit and erupted in a splendid pyrotechnic display. Unfortunately, there is no evidence to confirm the kill.

Tench’s first war patrol had begun soon after the invasion of Iwo Jima and continued past the landings on Okinawa. American planners had foreseen the possibility of Japan's attempting to strike back at the Allied forces with what remained of the Imperial surface fleet. They therefore stationed a picket line of submarines off Japan to serve as an early warning system. Tench received orders to join this patrol line before concluding her war patrol. She was on station off the western coast of the Japanese home islands when the Yamato task force sortied on 6 April to contest the Okinawa landings. Tench did not make a sighting, since Yamato sortied from the Bungo Suido. That station was assigned Threadfin (SS-410), which raised the alarm; the picket line was disbanded, and each submarine turned to its own individual mission. In accordance to orders, Tench cleared the area for an air-sea rescue sweep of the East China Sea before ending her patrol. On 8 April, she picked up the pilot and radioman from a dive-bomber from Essex (CV-9) and then headed for Guam, where she arrived on 14 April.

== Second War Patrol ==
Refit completed and her crew rested, Tench (now skippered by Tom Baskett) returned to sea early in May for her second war patrol. That patrol took her again to the Japanese homeland, but this time to the Tsugaru Strait between Honshū and Hokkaidō, the northern entrance to the Sea of Japan. Her mission was to interdict Japanese shipping as it attempted to run north and south between the Kuril Islands and Tokyo. Her first contact came on 25 May and proved to be an enemy warship. While patrolling on the surface, she sighted a periscope approaching her out of the fog. She submerged immediately, picked the enemy up on her sound gear, and evaded him successfully. During the waning days of May, she sighted little enemy shipping of consequence though her gun crews dispatched a number of motor luggers, picket boats, steam trawlers, and other small craft to the depths.

On 1 June, however, fortune began to favor the submarine. That evening, she encountered the 861-ton Mikamisan Maru hugging the coast of Honshū near Shirlya. Tench stalked her quarry until 0700 the next morning when she caught the coaster about one-half mile (900 m) off shore. In a surface attack, the submarine scored two torpedo hits on Mikamisan Maru and sent her to the bottom. Two days later, Tench scored a single hit amidships on the 517-ton Ryujin Maru which proved sufficient to sink her. For five days, the submarine worked her way back and forth across the strait, dodging enemy patrols and picket boats but without finding suitable targets. Then, on 9 June, she came across the biggest game of her wartime career: the 2857-ton freighter Kamishika Maru. Tench sank the merchantman in a submerged attack and spent the rest of the day evading spirited and persistent enemy retaliation. The following day, she dispatched an enemy tanker, the 834-ton Shoei Maru Number Six in another submerged attack. Again, the Japanese patrol force went after the submarine with everything it had, but failed even to come close.

In fact, Tench’s closest call was self-inflicted. On 11 June, she engaged a Japanese destroyer in a night surface attack. After firing a salvo of torpedoes at the enemy from her bow tubes, Tench put her rudder hard over to turn and retired rapidly. Just then, the lookouts reported one of her own Mark 14 torpedoes running in a wide circle and on a collision course with Tench. Frantic moments of evasive action ensued, but the torpedo hung tenaciously on to its collision course. Once again fortune smiled. The torpedo ran deeply and passed directly under the submarine's stern. Tench continued her retirement unaware of the results of her attack – in all probability unsuccessful – but heartened by her escape from what had seemed certain destruction. After five more days of hunting enemy shipping during which she encountered and sank a motor trawler with gunfire, Tench headed toward Midway Island, her score for the patrol (according to JANAC) four ships for 5,000 tons.

== Third War Patrol ==
Following refit, she put to sea on her third and final war patrol. On 29 July, she once again passed through Colnett Strait and entered the East China Sea. On 30 July, she found another motor lugger and punched holes in her with her 40 millimeter gun. She then proceeded to round up the lugger's nine-man Korean crew, all of whom had taken to the water at the first hint of trouble. Between 2 August and 4 August, she rode out an East China Sea typhoon and on 6 August, released her prisoners in a small boat near the Korean coast. That afternoon, she headed in toward the harbor on the small island of Osei To, near the western coast of Korea, to conduct a shore bombardment. During that escapade, her guns destroyed four schooners and severely damaged another five, along with a sea truck, a motor trawler, and some warehouses and other dockside installations. Tench then shifted north to the Gulf of Bohai, between the Liaodong Peninsula of Manchuria and the Shandong Peninsula of China. Her last encounter of the war occurred on 9 August when she surfaced in fog to torpedo and sink a seagoing tug towing two large barges. While the submarine retired from that attack, two Japanese "Betty" medium bombers dropped a bomb apiece some 500 yards (460 m) off her port beam and retired themselves. (These craft were all too small to be recorded by JANAC, and her credited score for the patrol was zero.) That ended her hostile actions. On 15 August, the Japanese Empire capitulated, and hostilities ceased.

Tench remained on station until 28 August and then headed for Guam, where she arrived on 2 September. After a brief stop at Apra harbor, she headed back toward the United States. Following stops at Pearl Harbor and Balboa, Canal Zone, Tench moored at New London, Connecticut, on 6 October 1945 – a year to the day since she had entered commission. In March 1946, she was placed in reserve at New London.

== Post World War II and fate ==
Almost four years of idleness ended for Tench in October 1950, when she came out of "mothballs" to be converted to a Greater Underwater Propulsion Power Program (GUPPY) submarine. Over the next three months, she underwent extensive modifications to improve her performance characteristics for submerged operations. In January 1951, the submarine was recommissioned at Norfolk, Virginia, with Commander Frederiek N. Russell in command.

Tench’s second period of active service lasted just over two decades. For the most part, she conducted routine training operations off the East Coast. Initially, she operated out of Norfolk as a unit of Submarine Squadron 6 (SubRon 6). While so assigned, she made her first deployment to the Mediterranean Sea in January 1952. Upon her return three months later, she resumed her schedule of east coast and Caribbean Sea operations. On the night of 13 January 1955, Tench accidentally grounded herself in ten feet of water 1,500 yards due east of the Cape Henry lighthouse, a Navy spokesman said. She got off the sand bar under her own power with the aid of high seas. She was stranded from 2100 hrs. to 2230 hrs. During the summer of 1955, the submarine changed homeports, leaving SubRon 6 behind for duty with SubRon 2, based at New London, Connecticut. In addition to periodic fleet exercises including Operation ICEX during the spring of 1960 in the Gulf of St. Lawrence, Tench served as a school ship for the Submarine School located at New London. That employment continued until October 1961 at which time she stood out of New London on her second deployment to the Sixth Fleet in the Mediterranean from which she returned early in 1962. Another extended period of duty with the Submarine School followed. That assignment was augmented by duty with various aviation and surface units in a series of antisubmarine warfare exercises. On 8 June 1965, Tench encountered the 13' 6" sailboat Tinkerbelle and its captain, Robert Manry as he made a historic trans-Atlantic voyage between Falmouth, MA and Falmouth, England. At the time, it was the smallest boat to cross the Atlantic nonstop. Early in April 1966, Tench broke that routine once again for a four-month cruise with the Sixth Fleet. This appears to have been her third and last tour of duty in the Mediterranean. Upon completion of the deployment, she returned once again to her New London-based training operations which occupied the submarine for the remainder of her active career.

During the late summer and early fall of 1968, Tench took part in a NATO exercise, Operation "Silvertower," in the eastern Atlantic. During that assignment, she visited ports in the United Kingdom, Germany, and Portugal. The submarine returned to New London on 4 November and began her final 19 months of active service. Near the end of her career, she was given hull classification symbol AGSS-417 (general auxiliary submarine) on 1 October 1969. She was placed in commission, in reserve, at Philadelphia, Pennsylvania, later that month; and, on 8 May 1970, Tench was placed out of commission. Berthed at Philadelphia, Tench remained in reserve until 1973. On 16 August 1973, her name was stricken from the Naval Vessel Register, and she was subsequently scrapped.

Tench was awarded three battle stars for her World War II service.
