= Crawford Auto-Aviation Museum =

The Crawford Auto-Aviation Collection
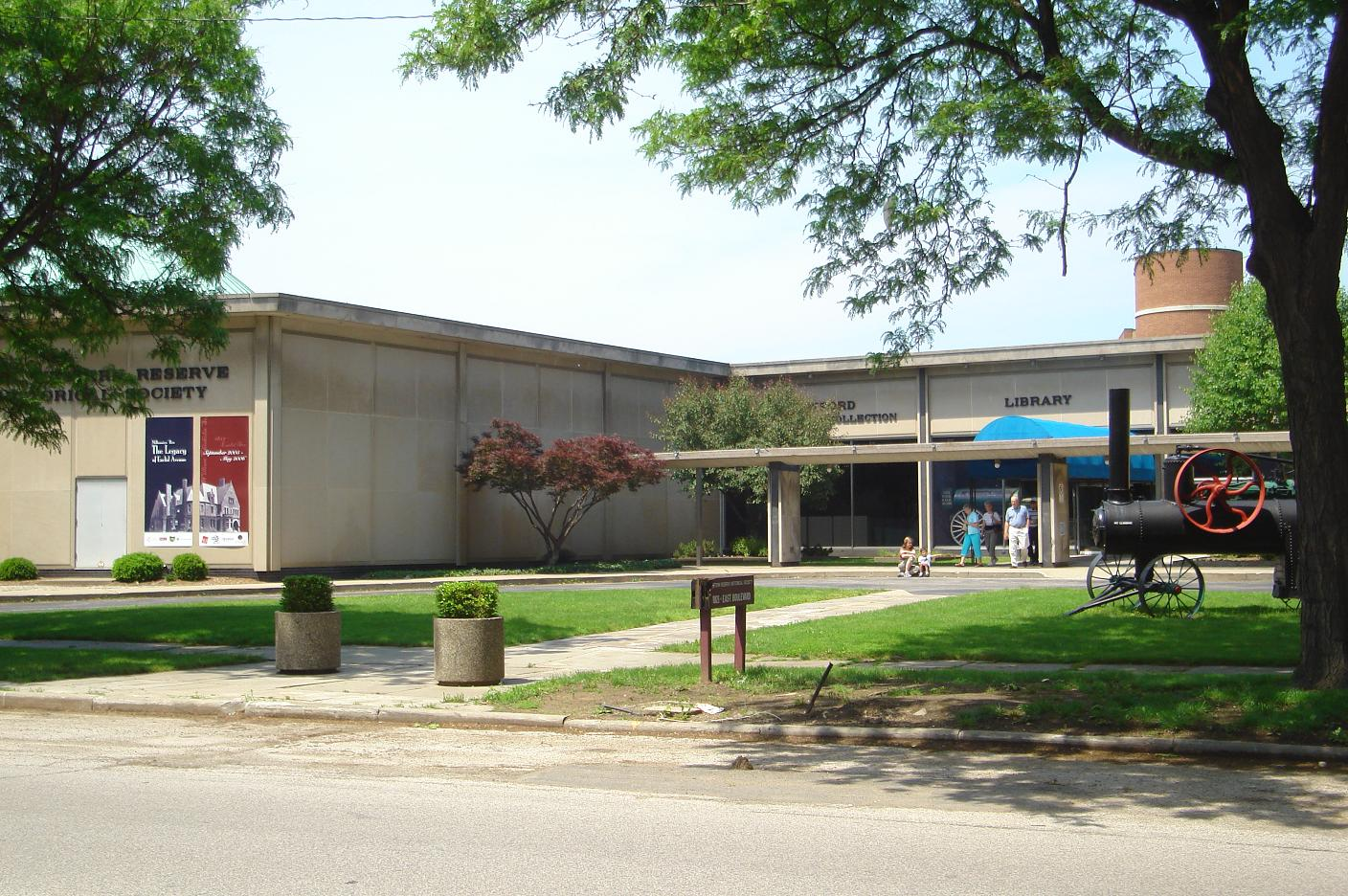
- Established: 1965; 61 years ago
- Location: 10825 East Boulevard; Cleveland, Ohio 44106; USA
- Coordinates: 41.5131°N 81.6112°W
- Founder: Frederick C. Crawford
- Website: The Crawford Auto-Aviation Collection

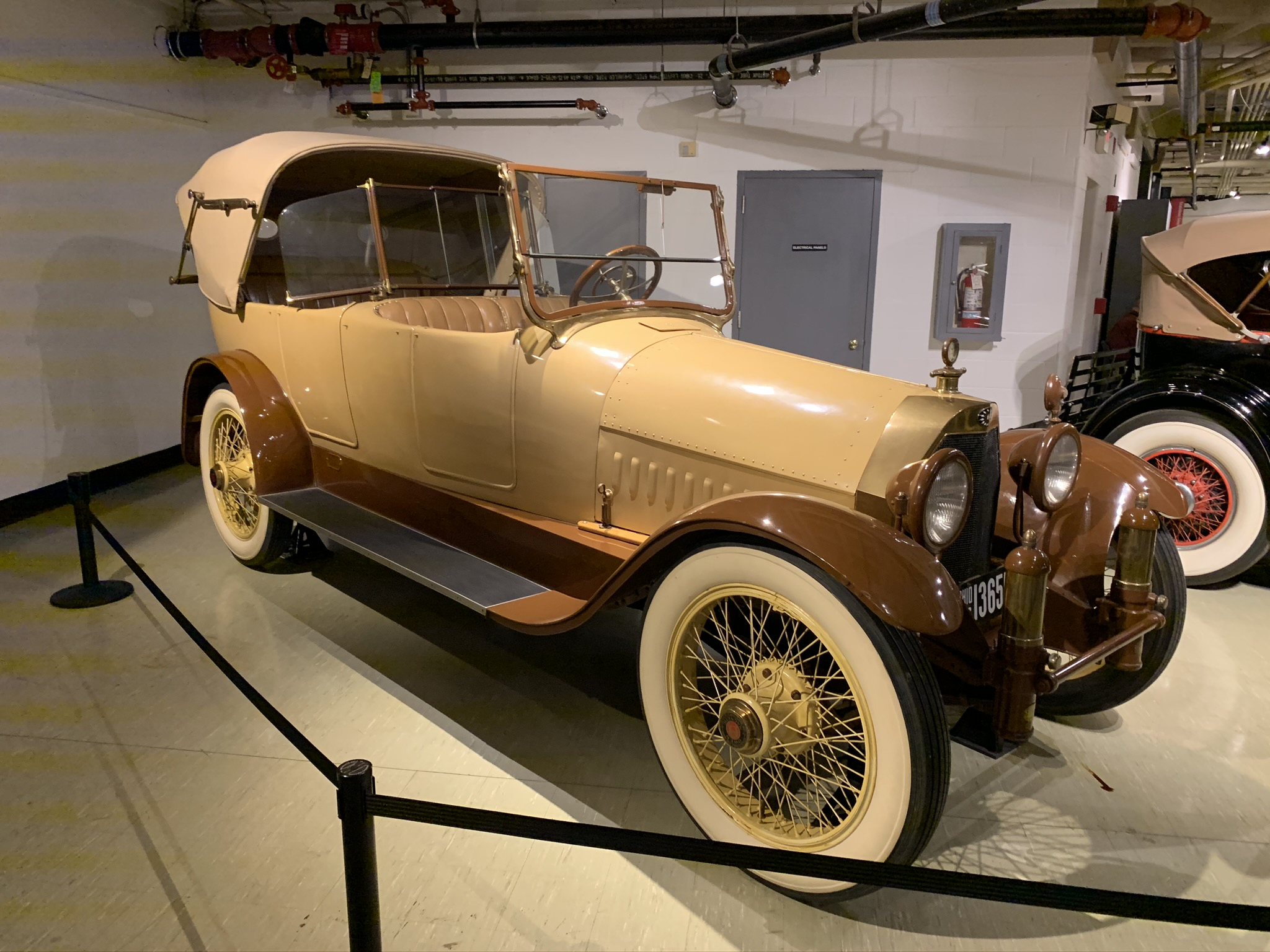
1916 Owen Magnetic

The Crawford Auto-Aviation Museum is a transportation museum in Cleveland, Ohio, United States. It is part of the Western Reserve Historical Society's Cleveland History Center in University Circle, and its collection includes about 170 cars. It was founded by Frederick C. Crawford of TRW, and opened in 1965.

== History ==
The collection began as the Thompson Products Auto Album, which was also founded by Crawford. Crawford explained that when he started collecting the cars, it was simply because it seemed a shame to let them be scrapped, which was the typical fate of almost all antique machinery at the time. He saw value in saving a few historically significant examples.

In 1990, the museum sold off almost 70 automobiles by putting them up for auction with Sotheby's.

To pay down debt, the museum sold or auctioned 44 cars in 2009, 24 of them through RM Auctions in October. The deaccessions proceeded over public protest and the objections of Kay Crawford, the widow of founder Frederick C. Crawford. The museum also sold a Goodyear F2G Corsair it had purchased from Walter Soplata and a Airco DH.4 originally acquired by Crawford.

As of 2018, the museum featured two major exhibits: Setting the World in Motion, featuring cars and airplanes made in Northeast Ohio, and REVolution: The Automobile in America, telling the story of the automobile in America.

The museum dismissed its director, Brad Brownell, in 2023 due to disagreements over object use philosophies.

== Facilities ==
The museum's restoration and storage facility is located in Macedonia, Ohio.

== Collections ==
As of 2019 there were more than 170 automobiles, 12 aircraft, 3 antique carriages, and 21 non-car artifacts (motorcycles, boats and bicycles). The facility includes more than 2,000 square feet (190 m^{2}) of archival collections.

The aviation collection includes a P-51 Mustang racing plane used in Thompson Trophy Races. The oldest car in the collection is an 1897 Panhard et Levassor, while later acquisitions include the first production DeLorean from 1981 and a self-driving car named DEXTER which was team Team Case's entry in the DARPA Urban Challenge 2007, in which it placed in the top 20.

Other vehicles in the collection include Tinkerbelle, a small sailboat in which Robert Manry solo sailed across the Atlantic Ocean in 1965. Manry donated it to the Historical Society in 1967.

In 2016, the museum's 1913 ALCO Model Six Berline Limousine won the Ansel Adams Award at the Pebble Beach Concours d'Elegance in California.

== See also ==
- List of aerospace museums
- List of automobile museums
- List of museums in Ohio
