= Tartan 27-2 =

1970s American recreational keelboat

Development
- Designer: Sparkman & Stephens
- Location: United States
- Year: 1976
- No. built: 64
- Builder: Tartan Marine
- Role: Cruiser
- Name: Tartan 27-2

Boat
- Displacement: 7,400 lb (3,357 kg)
- Draft: 6.33 ft (1.93 m) with centerboard down

Hull
- Type: monohull
- Construction: fiberglass
- LOA: 27.00 ft (8.23 m)
- LWL: 21.42 ft (6.53 m)
- Beam: 8.63 ft (2.63 m)
- Engine: Universal Atomic 4 30 hp (22 kW) gasoline engine, or Farymann one cylinder 12 hp (9 kW) diesel engine

Hull appendages
- Keel: modified long keel with cutaway forefoot, plus centerboard
- Ballast: 2,400 lb (1,089 kg)
- Rudder: keel-mounted rudder

Rig
- Rig type: Masthead sloop, optional yawl
- I foretriangle height: 34.65 ft (10.56 m)
- J foretriangle base: 9.83 ft (3.00 m)
- P mainsail luff: 30.50 ft (9.30 m)
- E mainsail foot: 13.50 ft (4.11 m)
- Rig other: PY: 13.00 ft (3.96 m); EY: 5.67 ft (1.73 m)

Sails
- Sailplan: Masthead sloop, optional yawl
- Mainsail area: 205.88 sq ft (19.127 m^{2})
- Jib/genoa area: 170.30 sq ft (15.821 m^{2})
- Other sails: mizzen sail: 36.86 sq ft (3.424 m^{2})
- Total sail area: 413.04 sq ft (38.373 m^{2})

The Tartan 27-2 is a recreational keelboat as a cruiser built by Tartan Marine, in Painesville, Ohio, from 1976 until 1979, with 64 boats completed. Most were produced with a masthead sloop rig, and a small number were produced with a yawl rig.

It used the same hull mold as the Tartan 27 but with a higher sheer. The fiberglass hull has an angled transom, a keel-mounted rudder controlled by a tiller and a fixed modified long keel with a cutaway forefoot. It has a draft of 6.33 ft (1.93 m) with the centerboard extended and 3.17 ft (0.97 m) with it retracted. It has a calculated hull speed of 6.2 kn (11.5 km/h).

It has four berths, with a "V"-berth and two settees in the main cabin. The L-shaped galley is starboard and is equipped with a two-burner stove, an ice box and a sink. A navigation station is on the port side. The head is aft of the V-berth on the port side.
