= Shoregate Towers =

American Structure

Coordinates: 41.642219°N 81.471984°W

Shoregate Towers is an apartment complex formerly owned by K&D Group located in Willowick, Ohio, United States. Shoregate Towers consists of two towers, The West Building and the East Building. The East Building has a business center and the West Building houses the management company's office. Each building is 12 stories high.

Shoregate Towers offers a range of amenities for its residents, including a fitness center, a swimming pool, and parking facilities. The building is designed to provide modern comforts and luxurious living spaces. It features both residential and commercial units.

== 2010 car accident ==
In the early morning of April 21, 2010, a car was driven at a high speed into a mound in front of the east tower. The car then launched an estimated 173 feet through the air before slamming into the side of the apartment building about three floors up. The driver, a 26-year-old Mentor man, died on impact.
