= Soverel 33 =

High performance racing yacht

The Soverel 33 is a high performance racing yacht, launched in 1983 by renowned racing sailor and designer Mark Soverel. It was primarily intended as a one-design fleet but, although approximately 90 boats were built, that never quite happened. The boat was a success as a racer and a forerunner to the modern sports boat with its light displacement (5,300-5,900 lbs depending on builder), large sail area and open transom.

The boats were built by four different builders. The first 69 boats were built at Bill Soverel's plant in Florida. Five (with flush decks) were produced at Republic Boats in California in 1984. 19 were built by George Olson's Pacific Yachts in 1985 and the balance (about 10) were built by Tartan Yachts in North Carolina and later Grand River, Ohio.
