= USS Balao =

Submarine of the United States

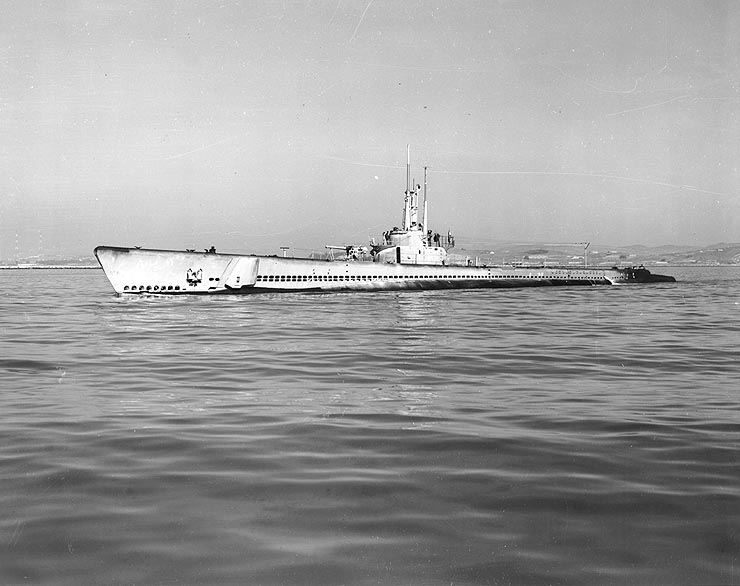
- Balao off the Mare Island Navy Yard, Vallejo, California on 25 October 1944

History

United States
- Name: Balao
- Namesake: Balao halfbeak
- Builder: Portsmouth Naval Shipyard, Kittery, Maine
- Laid down: 26 June 1942
- Launched: 27 October 1942
- Commissioned: 4 February 1943
- Decommissioned: 20 August 1946
- Recommissioned: 4 March 1952
- Decommissioned: 11 July 1963
- Stricken: 1 August 1963
- Honors and awards: 9 battle stars for World War II
- Fate: Sunk as a target off Florida on 6 September 1963; conning tower is a memorial at the Navy Memorial Museum, Washington, D.C.

General characteristics
- Class & type: Balao-class diesel-electric submarine
- Displacement: 1,526 long tons (1,550 t) surfaced, 2,414 long tons (2,453 t) submerged
- Length: 311 ft 9 in (95.02 m)
- Beam: 27 ft 3 in (8.31 m)
- Draft: 16 ft 10 in (5.13 m) maximum
- Propulsion: 4 × General Motors Model 16-278A V16 diesel engines driving electrical generators; 2 × 126-cell Sargo batteries; 4 × high-speed General Electric electric motors with reduction gears; 2 × propellers; 5,400 shp (4.0 MW) surfaced; 2,740 shp (2.0 MW) submerged
- Speed: 20.25 kn (23.3 mph; 37.5 km/h) surfaced, 8.75 kn (10.1 mph; 16.2 km/h) submerged
- Range: 11,000 nmi (13,000 mi; 20,000 km) surfaced @ 10 kn (12 mph; 19 km/h)
- Endurance: 48 hours @ 2 kn (2.3 mph; 3.7 km/h) submerged; 75 days on patrol
- Test depth: 400 ft (120 m)
- Complement: 10 officers, 70–71 enlisted
- Armament: 10 × 21 inch (533 mm) torpedo tubes (six forward, four aft; 24 torpedoes); one 4 in (100 mm)/50 caliber deck gun; one 40 mm (1.57 in) Bofors antiaircraft cannon; two .50 cal (12.7 mm) machineguns

USS Balao (hull number SS/AGSS-285) was the lead ship of the United States Navy's Balao-class submarines during World War II and named for the balao, a small schooling marine fish.

== Construction and commissioning ==
Balao's keel was laid down on 26 June 1942 at the Portsmouth Navy Yard in Kittery, Maine. She was launched on 27 October 1942, sponsored by Mrs. Jane Aylward, wife of Lieutenant Commander Theodore C. Aylward, commissioned on 4 February 1943 and reported to the United States Pacific Fleet.

== World War II ==
After a six-week training period in New London, Connecticut, the submarine sailed for the Pacific Theater of Operations and joined the 7th Fleet at Brisbane, Australia, on 10 July 1943.

=== First patrol, July – September 1943 ===
At the end of a brief refit alongside submarine tender Fulton, Balao got underway on 25 July to begin her first war patrol. She topped off her fuel tanks from submarine rescue vessel Coucal on 29 July, and on 7 August, took station in the scouting line in the sea-lanes between Truk and the Bismarck Archipelago. However, she made only five enemy contacts and was unable to launch a single attack. The scouting line was discontinued on 26 August, and Balao shifted to patrol the Palau–Rabaul shipping route, where she fared no better. The submarine trained in emergency dives, and her crew frequently went to battle stations upon the sighting of enemy aircraft, but the patrol was not enlivened by action with surface ships before the boat moored alongside Fulton in Brisbane on 13 September for refit.

=== Second patrol, October – November 1943 ===
Her second war patrol began on 4 October, when Balao sailed in company with Silversides for Tulagi. After refueling there on 11 October, the submarine got underway for her assigned area north of the Bismarck Archipelago and again covered the Palau-Rabaul routes. Balao sighted a convoy on 17 October, but it escaped her salvo of six torpedoes by making a radical zigzag maneuver and increasing speed to open the range. The convoy's escorts counterattacked with depth charges, but Balao came away unscathed. Her targets moved out of range at high speed, preventing her from regaining contact.

Balao joined Silversides in a coordinated attack on a seven-ship convoy on 23 October, firing 10 torpedoes at three ships that presented an overlapping target. She scored six hits. One ship was seen down by the bow, with her stern in the air; another listed heavily; and a third was riding low in the water. While Balao was maneuvering into position for a second attack, the convoy's escorts fired on her, forcing the submarine to dive. Balao lost contact with the convoy and failed in her attempts to reach Silversides to exchange information. She later learned, however, that her consort sank three of the seven ships.

Balao stopped at Tulagi to refuel and to load torpedoes. On 28 October, she was assigned to a scouting line south of Truk. On 4 November, the submarine made a submerged approach to a two-ship convoy, but the six torpedoes that she fired missed their marks. Balao then shifted to the Truk-New Hanover route, where she conducted an uneventful patrol until 7 November, when she headed for Milne Bay, New Guinea, for refit alongside Fulton.

=== Third patrol, December 1943 – January 1944 ===
Underway again on 6 December, Balao spent two days in training exercises and practice approaches with Ethan as her target. On 13 December, the submarine conducted communication and identification tests with friendly search planes and then began her patrol. No surface contacts came during the first two weeks, but her luck changed on 27 December, when two Mogami-class cruisers and two Asashio-class destroyers crossed her track. The four warships maneuvered in a radical zigzag plan at a speed of 20 knots (37 km/h; 23 mph), passing the submarine so rapidly that she only managed a shot at the second cruiser. Balao fired four torpedoes that overran their targets. While rigging for depth charges, she heard three explosions, but upon surfacing, could see no sign of damage. The warships were long gone at their high speed.

Balao began 1944 with a contact that turned out to be a very large steamer and two escorts. The weather impeded her efforts to close on the convoy, but also offered protection when a rain squall covered Balao while she fired six torpedoes. The submarine counted three explosions and then went deep to wait out the inevitable depth-charge attack by the escorts. When Balao surfaced the next morning, the convoy had disappeared. Certain that the freighter had been sunk, Balao resumed her patrol of the shipping lanes. She later sighted a convoy of a damaged freighter and two escorts and moved in for an attack, only to discover that the freighter was her target of 1 January. The escorts drove Balao off, and on 7 January, she was ordered back to Brisbane, still without a confirmed kill under her belt.

=== Fourth patrol, February – March 1944 ===
Balao arrived in Brisbane on 15 January for a normal two-week refit and a brief training period. On 6 February, she was underway via Tulagi for her patrol area north of New Guinea, which she entered on 13 February. Her first opportunity to attack came just after midnight on 23 February, when she closed on a convoy of two freighters and one small escort. Balao fired six torpedoes at the larger of the two freighters, scoring three hits. The escort maneuvered to attack, but never came close to the submarine. Rather than risk a repetition of her disappointment during her last patrol, Balao returned to the scene to verify that the ship had sunk. A survivor was taken on board, who stated that his vessel, the 5,857-ton passenger cargo ship Nikki Maru, had gone down rapidly after being hit.

A convoy located on 26 February did not offer a chance of attack, because Gato had first fired on it, causing its escorts to chase Balao from the scene. Two days later, Balao sighted smoke on the horizon and commenced tracking three ships and an escort. Shortly after midnight, Balao went to battle stations and closed for attack. After firing her six bow tubes at the lead ship, the submarine swung her stern toward the wing ships in the formation and fired her stern tubes. Balao heard several explosions at the expected times, as torpedo after torpedo struck home. One of the damaged ships trained a 3 in (76 mm) gun on Balao, but a heavy internal explosion silenced the gun before Balao could be hit. The submarine could see nothing except heavy smoke in the target area, but radar watched as two "pips" disappeared from the screen. Balao lured the escort out of the target area to double back to look for the third freighter. Radar and lookouts failed to locate the merchantman, so Balao returned to patrol the shipping lanes after a very successful attack. Postwar study of Japanese shipping records identified her victims as the 2,723-ton freighter Shoho Maru and the 6,803-ton passenger cargo ship Akiuro Maru.

On 3 March, Balao fired four torpedoes at a small freighter and escort from a distance that proved to be too great. All four torpedoes passed under their targets. Later that morning, Balao sighted a convoy of four small cargo ships, described as "the dregs of the worst of harbors." The convoy changed course and pulled away from the submarine before she could close for attack.

The next day, Balao investigated smoke on the horizon, found two cargo ships, tracked them through a rain squall, and as she passed into clear weather, found the convoy in perfect position for her torpedoes. She fired four stern tubes at the leading ship, but heard no explosions. The torpedoes were duds or had again passed underneath. As the escorts actively pursued the submarine, Balao submerged to wait out the inevitable depth charges. When the submarine surfaced again, all trace of the convoy was gone, and she set course for Langemak Bay, New Guinea, with all her torpedoes expended. On 7 March, Balao moored alongside Coucal and took on fuel and provisions. She got underway again on the following morning, bound for Pearl Harbor, where she arrived for refit on 19 March.

=== Fifth patrol, April – June 1944 ===
Balao completed refit and training on 24 April, and the next day began her voyage back to action. After stopping for a few hours at Midway to refuel, she continued to her patrol area around the Palau Islands. She contacted a small convoy on 14 May, but was unable to close for attack because of the diligence of the Japanese escorts. The submarine returned to patrolling the Yap–Palau shipping lanes. Her next contacts were unfavorable for attack, and problems with her surface search radar hampered her efforts to seek out enemy shipping.

On 1 June, the situation brightened. Balao made radar contact with a four-ship convoy and tracked it to an excellent position for attack. Just after midnight on 2 June, she launched six torpedoes from her bow tubes at one of the largest passenger cargo ships, scoring two hits. Although pursued by the escorts, Balao again managed to close the convoy, now with only two ships visible. Only minutes before Balao reached firing position, one of the escorts unwittingly moved to a spot on Balao's beam and stayed there, thwarting the submarine's second attempt. She was prevented from carrying out a dawn attack by Japanese air cover and was forced to allow the convoy to escape without further damage. A fuel shortage forced Balao to enter Majuro Atoll on 12 June to begin refit alongside submarine tender Sperry.

=== Sixth patrol, July – August 1944 ===
Balao began her sixth war patrol on 5 July, when she departed Majuro for the Palau area. The submarine made a few contacts, but none worthy of pursuit. On 26 July, Balao joined in the bombardment of Angaur Island in the Palaus by firing on a lighthouse and loading docks, scoring several direct hits. The same day, she witnessed a fighter plane from the carrier Bunker Hill splash into the water dead ahead and quickly managed to rescue the pilot. After transferring him to Dortch, Balao returned to lifeguard duties off Peleliu Island, where she picked up two more downed aviators on 27 July.

On 29 July, Balao joined Drum in a coordinated attack on two sampans, engaging them with gunfire until the Japanese abandoned ship and the sampans were destroyed. She then resumed patrol duty and continued the task until 12 August, when she met with Conyngham and headed for Tanapag Harbor, Saipan. Balao was then ordered back to the United States, where she entered the Mare Island Navy Yard on 20 August for a complete overhaul. Upon the completion of that work, she returned to Pearl Harbor on 15 November and prepared to return to the war in the Pacific.

=== Seventh patrol, December 1944 – January 1945 ===
Balao left Pearl Harbor on 4 December and met with Spot and Icefish en route Tanapag Harbor. The trio of submarines reached port on 15 December and moored in a nest alongside Fulton. After topping off fuel, water, and provisions on 17 December, they got underway to patrol the Yellow Sea in a coordinated attack group. Until 2 January 1945, their only contacts were fishing craft and floating mines. On that day, however, Balao sighted the masts of a sailing vessel. She closed the three-masted schooner and surfaced to attack. Her first two torpedoes missed the target, but the third hit squarely amidships and sank the vessel. That day proved to be lucky for Balao, because later that night, she picked up a larger ship on radar and successfully moved into position. Early on 8 January, she fired six torpedoes, three of which scored, but the stubborn "tanker" remained afloat despite being dead in the water. Balao fired seven more torpedoes for three more direct hits, but the target still refused to sink. The submarine closed in on the badly damaged tanker and fired another trio of torpedoes, one of which struck the final blow. However, Japanese records examined after the war indicate that Balao's victim on this occasion was not a tanker, but the 5,244-ton freighter Daigo Maru. After that, Balao patrolled independently until 19 January, when she pulled into Apra Harbor, Guam, for refit alongside Apollo.

=== Eighth patrol, February – April 1945 ===
Balao began her eighth war patrol on 27 February as part of another attack group along with Tench (like Balao, also the lead ship of a submarine class), Guardfish, and Sea Devil on patrol in the East China and Yellow Seas. Her first opportunity for action came on 9 March, when she sighted a small tanker with two escorts steaming along the coastline. Although not in an ideal attack position, the submarine fired four torpedoes at the tanker, all of which missed. The target's escorts struck back at Balao with depth charges, but the submarine escaped damage and resumed patrol duty later that day. She sighted many vessels during the next eight days, but did not attack them. On 18 March, Balao caught a 188-ton trawler alone, sank it with gunfire, and then rescued three survivors in the debris. Early the next morning, she attacked a convoy of four transports guarded by four escorts. Firing 10 torpedoes at three of the targets, Balao heard four hits and the explosion on one of the transports nearly blinded her lookouts. The early-morning darkness made assessing the damage impossible, but Balao received credit for sinking Hakozaki Maru, a 10,413-ton transport. {The Tatsuhara Maru was damaged}. The submarine then escaped to deep water to continue her patrol. Later that same afternoon, Balao surfaced to attack a group of small trawlers. She sank one trawler and left three others burning fiercely.

Shortly before dawn on 21 March, Balao began tracking a convoy of two ships closely guarded by four escorts. The effectiveness with which the escorts countered her several approaches convinced Balao that she had been detected. As dawn broke, the submarine made one last approach, moving to 1,400 yd (1,300 m), where she fired four torpedoes. An escort picked up the submarine's trail, and Balao ran for deep water under a smoke screen without waiting to observe results. On 26 March, Balao encountered the 880-ton cargo ship, Shinto Maru No. 1, and sank her with gunfire. A small Japanese patrol vessel made an attempt to counterattack, but Balao slipped below the surface and headed for Guam to replenish her fuel, provisions, and torpedoes. On 2 April, Balao submerged rapidly to avoid detection by a large, low-flying enemy plane and took on several feet of water in her conning tower, grounding out her radar and other electrical gear. Despite these problems, she arrived safely at Guam on 8 April for refit.

=== Ninth patrol, May – June 1945 ===
The submarine began her ninth patrol on 3 May, when she headed for the Yellow Sea to patrol in a wolfpack with Dragonet, Shad, and Spikefish. Targets were scarce and mechanical difficulties plagued Balao. On 19 May, the submarine attacked a small freighter, but all three of the torpedoes that she fired missed the target. Nevertheless, she did win a consolation prize when one of her torpedoes struck and sank a nearby 30-ton junk. On 23 May, Balao's earlier mechanical difficulties rendered her stern diving planes totally inoperable, and she received orders to Pearl Harbor for refit. En route, she embarked a sailor from Torsk suffering from appendicitis and an injured Sand Lance crewman. Later that evening, although the radar scope was clear and no other submarines were known to be in the vicinity, Balao was suddenly attacked by torpedoes. The quick reactions of the officer of the deck caused two to pass to port and two to starboard. The submarine continued on to Midway, where she arrived on 3 June, discharged her passengers, and set a course for Pearl Harbor, where she arrived four days later.

=== Tenth patrol, July – August 1945 ===
A month in port readied her for sea once more, and Balao got underway on 7 July for the Nanpō Islands area and waters east of Honshū. Her primary duty during this 10th and final war patrol was to provide lifeguard services for Allied aircrew during strikes on the Japanese home islands. Balao operated with air cover while on station and rescued four aviators during the patrol. Japan had been so weakened by the final weeks of the war that surface contacts were scarce. She was able to sink one picket boat and damage another with gunfire on 14 August. Word of Japan's capitulation came on 15 August, along with orders to cease fire. Balao met with Peto the next day to transfer the rescued aviators, then proceeded on to Pearl Harbor, where she arrived on 25 August.

=== After the war ===
The submarine departed Pearl Harbor on 31 August for Staten Island, New York, where her crew enjoyed a well-deserved rest period and she underwent an overhaul. Balao was decommissioned on 20 August 1946, and she was berthed in New London, Connecticut, as part of the Atlantic Reserve Fleet.

== 1952–1963 ==
Balao was recommissioned on 4 March 1952 at the U.S. Naval Submarine Base, New London, Connecticut, Lieutenant Commander S. V. Hadley in command, and assigned to the Atlantic Fleet's Submarine Squadron 4 (SubRon 4). After shakedown training, the submarine was reassigned to SubRon 12 at the U.S. Naval Base in Key West, Florida. There, she served primarily as a training ship for antisubmarine and special development forces in the Key West and Guantánamo Bay operating areas.

After making several goodwill visits to ports in the Southern United States, Balao joined the ships of Destroyer Squadron 24 (DesRon 24) in a combined antisubmarine warfare training and goodwill cruise to South America that began on 6 January 1957. After joint exercises with the navies of several South American countries, the ship made liberty calls to principal ports such as La Guaira, Venezuela; Rio de Janeiro, Brazil; Montevideo, Uruguay; and Mar del Plata and Buenos Aires, Argentina. The submarine returned to Key West on 22 March.

Balao deployed to Guantanamo Bay Naval Base four times in the next year, spending one month each time training surface ships in "refresher training". The submarine departed Key West on 19 July 1958 for an overhaul at the Charleston Naval Shipyard. Upon its completion on 13 November, Balao conducted refresher training at New London and Newport, Rhode Island. After Balao's return to Key West on 30 November, Archerfish and she spent 12 days of December in hunter-killer training.

=== Return to service ===
After her fame and stardom in the 1959 Blake Edwards film Operation Petticoat, Balao returned to local training operations. On 1 April 1960, she was reclassified as an auxiliary submarine, AGSS-285, but continued to serve as a training ship. On 3 March 1961, Balao simulated a disabled submarine for the testing of a new device for individual escape. The mechanism, known as the "Steinke hood", enabled Commander W. F. Mazzone and Lieutenant H. E. Steinke, the hood's inventor, to ascend from a depth of 318 ft (97 m) to the surface in 55 seconds, setting a new record.

From 28 June–4 November, the submarine underwent overhaul and battery renewal. She returned to Key West and resumed services in training. In April 1962, Balao deployed to the Mediterranean Sea, where she joined the 6th Fleet for four months of exercises with other NATO navies. Balao also deployed to the western Atlantic during the Cuban Missile Crisis in October–November, but returned to routine training duty when the trouble died down.

=== Decommissioning ===
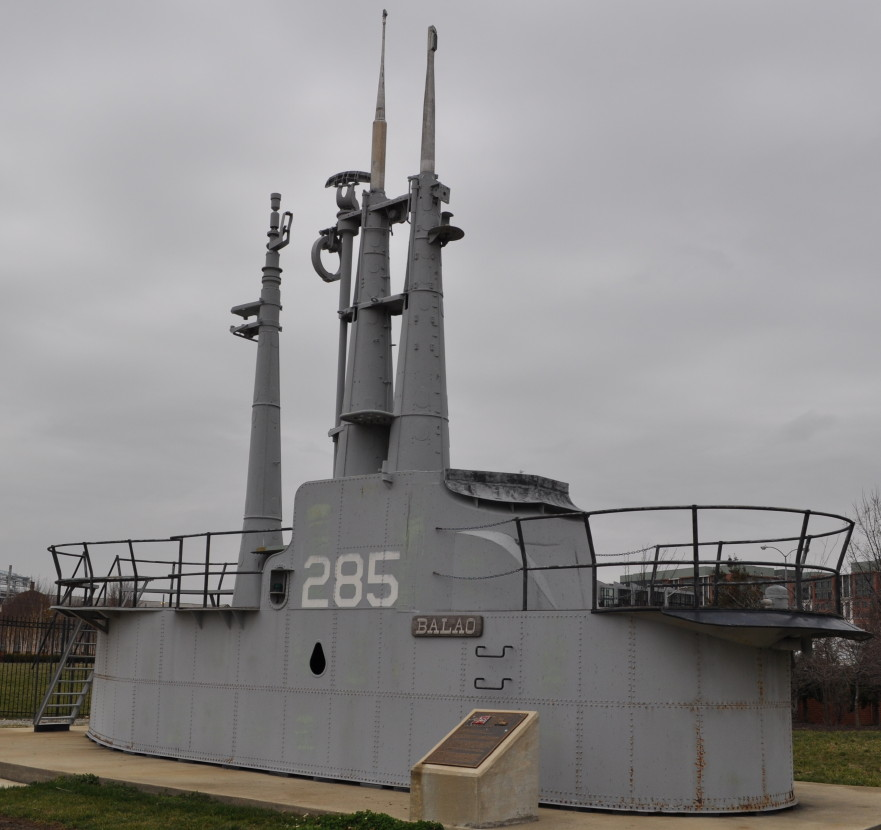
Balao's conning tower preserved in the Washington Navy Yard

In 1963, the Board of Inspection and Survey determined Balao to be unfit for further service. The submarine was decommissioned on 1 August 1963, and her name was struck from the Naval Vessel Register that same day. Her hulk was sunk off the coast of northern Florida on 6 September as a target. Before this occurred, her conning tower and periscope shears were removed, and are on display on the waterfront at the National Museum of the United States Navy of the Washington Navy Yard in Washington, DC. Her anchor was removed and is displayed at Veterans' Memorial Park in Florence, Alabama.

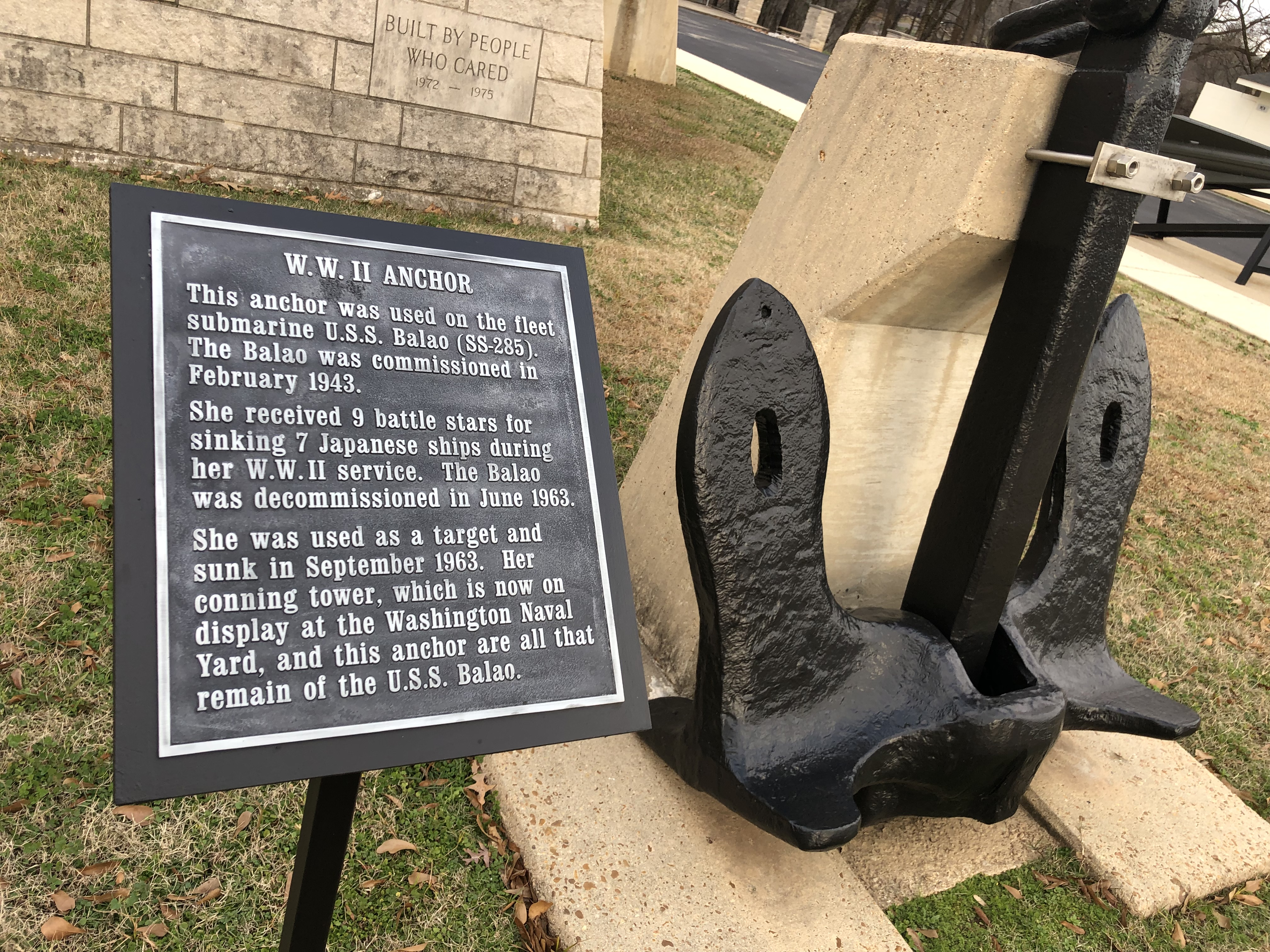
Balao's anchor is preserved in Veterans’ Memorial Park, Florence, Alabama.

== Awards ==
Balao received nine battle stars for her World War II service.
