= Alain Bombard =

French medical doctor and adventurer (1924–2005)

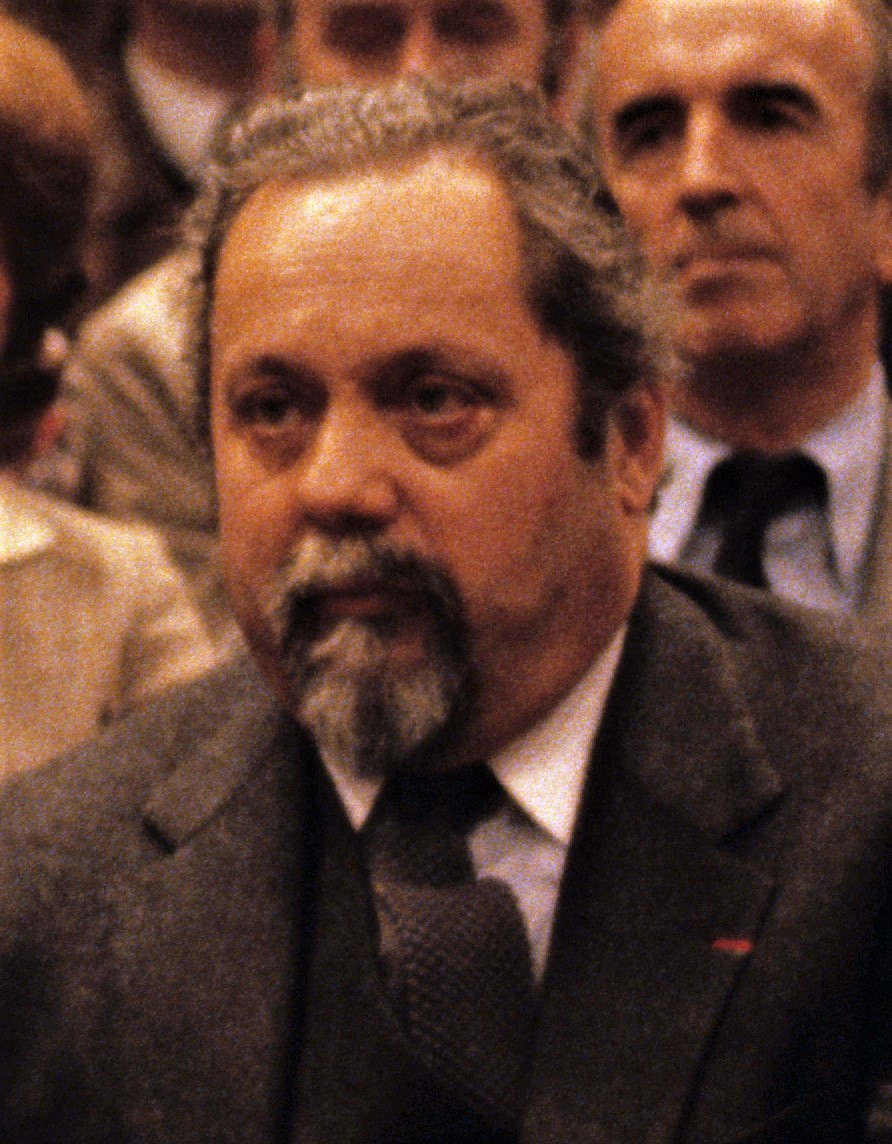
- Born: 27 October 1924; Paris, France
- Died: 19 July 2005 (aged 80); Toulon, France
- Known for: Survival skills
- Scientific career
- Fields: Medicine; Biology

Alain Bombard (French pronunciation: [alɛ̃ bɔ̃baʁ]; Paris, 27 October 1924 – Paris, 19 July 2005) was a French biologist, physician and politician, famous for sailing across the Atlantic Ocean in a small boat without provisions. In 1951, while working as a physician, he was unable to save the victims of a shipwreck. Motivated by this experience and hoping to save future lives, he theorized that it was possible to survive at sea for an extended period by living off the ocean. To test his theory, Bombard decided to sail across the Atlantic in an inflatable Zodiac bringing no food and water.

He was a Member of the European Parliament from the Socialist Party for France from 1981 to 1994.

== Biography ==
Alain Bombard was born in Paris on 27 October 1924 to a medical family. He later became a physician. He became interested in techniques for survival at sea after an incident where he was unable to save the victims of a shipwreck. In a preliminary test of his theories, in 1951, he attempted to swim the English Channel, eating only a diet of butter; the experiment failed and he needed rescue. He later studied at the Institut océanographique in Monaco, where he concluded that survival at sea was possible by drinking limited quantities of seawater and less salty fluids pressed from raw fish, in addition to eating fish and plankton. Determined to prove this theory, he planned to sail across the Atlantic in a small boat bringing no food and water.

Grave of Alain Bombard

Bombard began his journey in stages, first sailing from Tangier to Casablanca (13–20 August) and then to Las Palmas (24 August – 3 September). The voyage was briefly interrupted when he flew back to Paris for the birth of his child. On 19 October 1952, Bombard departed Las Palmas to begin the main trans-Atlantic crossing, heading for the West Indies. He sailed in a Zodiac inflatable boat named l'Hérétique ("the heretic"), which was a mere 4.5 metres (15 ft) long. For the journey, he took only a sextant and primitive fishing gear. He also had emergency food and water provisions that were sealed by a notary, to be opened only if necessary; the seal was never broken. The boat was the same type that would later contribute to the fame of his friend Jacques-Yves Cousteau. The successful voyage also turned out to be excellent marketing for Zodiac, as public interest and sales increased substantially afterward.

To survive, Bombard fished with a self-made harpoon and hooks and harvested surface plankton with a small net. The fish were a source of both food and fresh water, which he supplemented by drinking limited amounts of seawater for a long period of the trip. The journey was challenging from the start. On 23 October, only the fourth day out, he had to mend a torn sail after his backup sail was blown away. A significant navigation error also led him to believe he was traveling much faster than he actually was. On the fifty-third day, he encountered a British freight liner, the Arakaka, whose crew informed him that he was still over 1,000 kilometres (620 mi) short of his goal. The crew provided him with a meal, but as Bombard later wrote, the "fried egg, a little piece of liver, a spoonful of cabbage and some fruit... gave me the worst stomach trouble of the whole voyage." He declined the offer for safe passage back to Europe and decided to complete the trip. He reached Barbados on 23 December 1952, after traveling 4,400 kilometres (2,700 mi). Bombard had lost 25 kilograms (55 lb) and was briefly hospitalized but was able to walk the two miles to a rescue station. In 1953, he published a book titled Naufragé Volontaire, which was translated into English that same year as The Bombard Story.

Bombard's experiment was later investigated by the French and Taiwanese navies, both of which concurred with his findings. The Taiwanese exercise extending to 134 days. Hannes Lindemann, a German physician, canoeist, and sailing pioneer, took several shorter trips without water to better understand living on salt water and fish. However, he found that he needed fresh water (from rain) most days. However, Bombard never argued that human survival is possible only by drinking seawater. On the contrary, he indicated that seawater in small quantities can prolong survival if accompanied, when rainwater is not available, by the absorption of liquids present in the bodies of fish. Without it, he claimed a human drinking only seawater will die after approximately the same time as without water at all, but will remain conscious for longer, giving them time to search for alternatives. Bombard's legacy is still debated; in any case, an inflatable survival raft is still very often called a "bombard" in French, in memory of the doctor's crossing of the Atlantic.

In 1958, continuing his work with survival techniques, Bombard and six men were testing a rubber dinghy in rough waters off of the coast of the French town of Étel when a wave capsized the craft. A rescue crew of seven, standing by during the test, came to Bombard's rescue in a lifeboat which itself was capsized by a huge wave that knocked nine of the 14 people on board overboard. Bombard and four men were the only survivors.

He was associated with Jacques-Yves Cousteau, the Polar explorer Paul-Emile Victor, and the vulcanologist Haroun Tazieff. In May 1981, he was elected to the European Parliament and lasted there until 1994. He advocated for environmental issues, ranging from nuclear power to the culling of baby seals. His opposition to force-feeding geese for pâté de foie gras earned him and his family death threats.

He was appointed an Officer of the Légion d’Honneur in 2000.

Bombard died in Toulon in 2005 at the age of 80.

== Books ==
- Naufragé Volontaire (1953)
  - The Bombard Story, Andre Deutsch (1953)- Europe edition
  - The Voyage of the Heretique, Simon and Schuster (1953) - US edition
- La dernière exploration (1974)
- Les grands navigateurs (1976)
- Au-delà de l’horizon (1978)
- La mer et l’homme (1980)
- Aventurier de la mer (1998)
