= Tartan Marine =

Sailboat manufacturer

- Company type: Privately held company
- Industry: Boat building
- Founded: 1971
- Founder: Charles Britton
- Headquarters: Painesville, Ohio, United States
- Products: Sailboats
- Website: www.tartanyachts.com

Tartan Marine (also called Tartan Yachts) is an American boat builder based in Painesville, Ohio, near Lake Erie. The company specializes in the design and manufacture of fiberglass sailboats.

The company was founded by Charles Britton in 1971, who bought out the remains of the Douglass & McLeod after its factory was destroyed by a fire in 1971.

In 2018 Tartan was producing six designs, the Tartan 5300, Tartan 4700, Tartan 4300, Tartan 4000, Tartan 345 and the Tartan Fantail.

== Boats ==
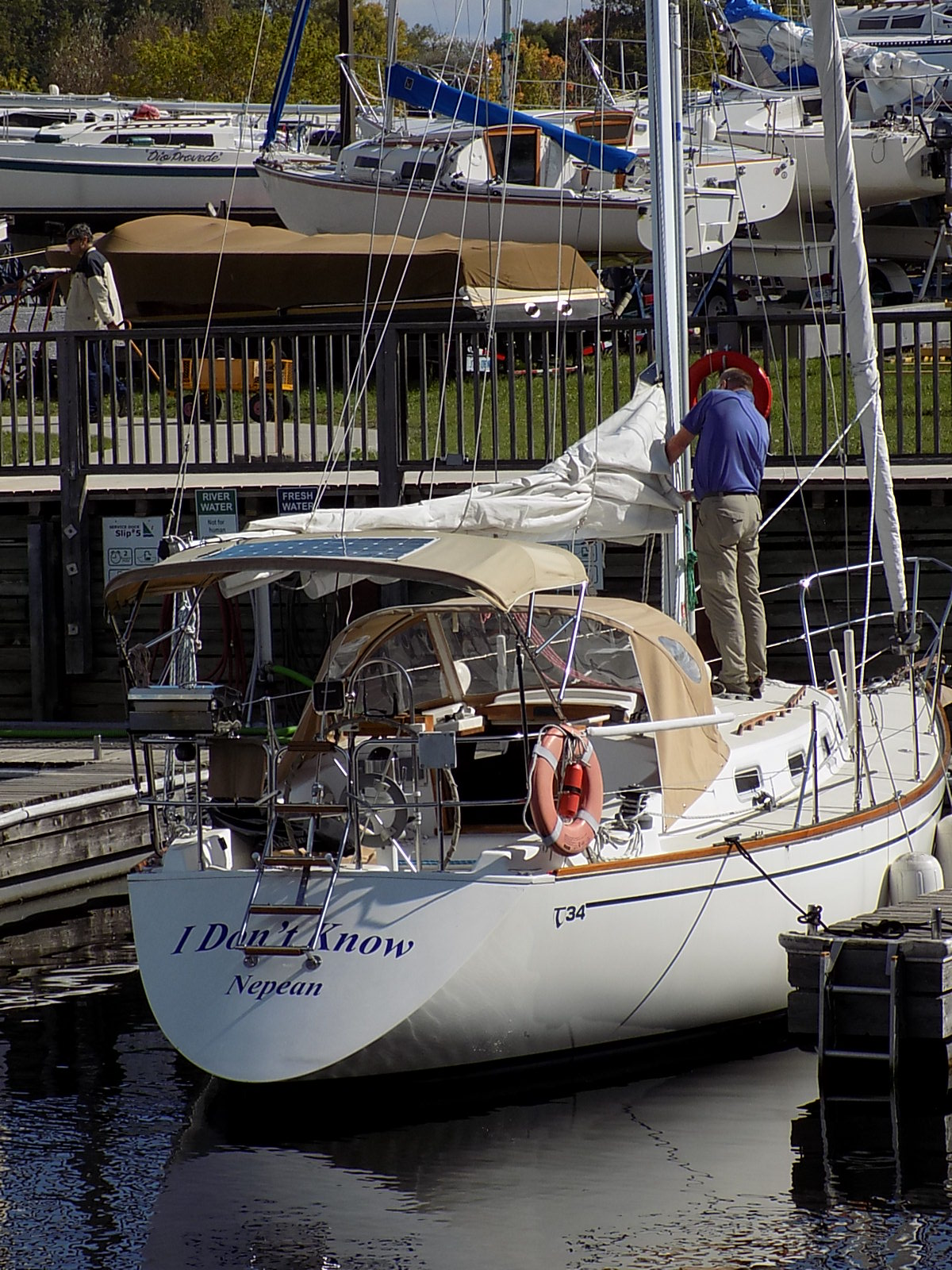
Tartan 34-2

Summary of boats built by Tartan:

- Black Watch 37
- Fantail 26
- Soverel 27
- Soverel 33
- Tangent One
- Tartan 10
- Tartan 26
- Tartan 27 Yawl
- Tartan 27
- Tartan 27-2
- Tartan 28
- Tartan 28 Piper
- Tartan 30
- Tartan 31
- Tartan 31 Piper
- Tartan 33
- Tartan 33 R
- Tartan 34 C
- Tartan 34-2
- Thomas 35
- Tartan 37
- Tartan 38
- Tartan 40
- Tartan 40 Offshore
- Tartan 41
- Tartan 41 Passagemaker
- Tartan 42
- Tartan 43
- Tartan 44
- Tartan 46
- Tartan 48
- Tartan 101
- Tartan 345
- Tartan 372
- Tartan 412
- Tartan 3000
- Tartan 3100
- Tartan 3400
- Tartan 3500
- Tartan 3700
- Tartan 3800
- Tartan 4000
- Tartan 4100
- Tartan 4300
- Tartan 4400
- Tartan 4600
- Tartan 4700
- Tartan 5300
- Tartan Pride 270
- Tartan Tock 40

== See also ==
- List of sailboat designers and manufacturers
