= HNLMS Walrus =

Two submarines of the Royal Netherlands Navy have borne the name HNLMS Walrus (S802), in honor of the walrus.

- HNLMS Walrus (1) was originally USS Icefish (SS-367), a United States Navy Balao-class submarine, launched in 1944 and decommissioned in 1946. The ship was loaned to the Netherlands in 1953; she was commissioned in the Royal Netherlands Navy as HNLMS Walrus (S802). In 1971, Walrus was sold for scrap.
- HNLMS Walrus (802) is a Walrus-class submarine, launched in 1985, decommissioned in 2023.
