= USS Icefish =

Submarine of the United States

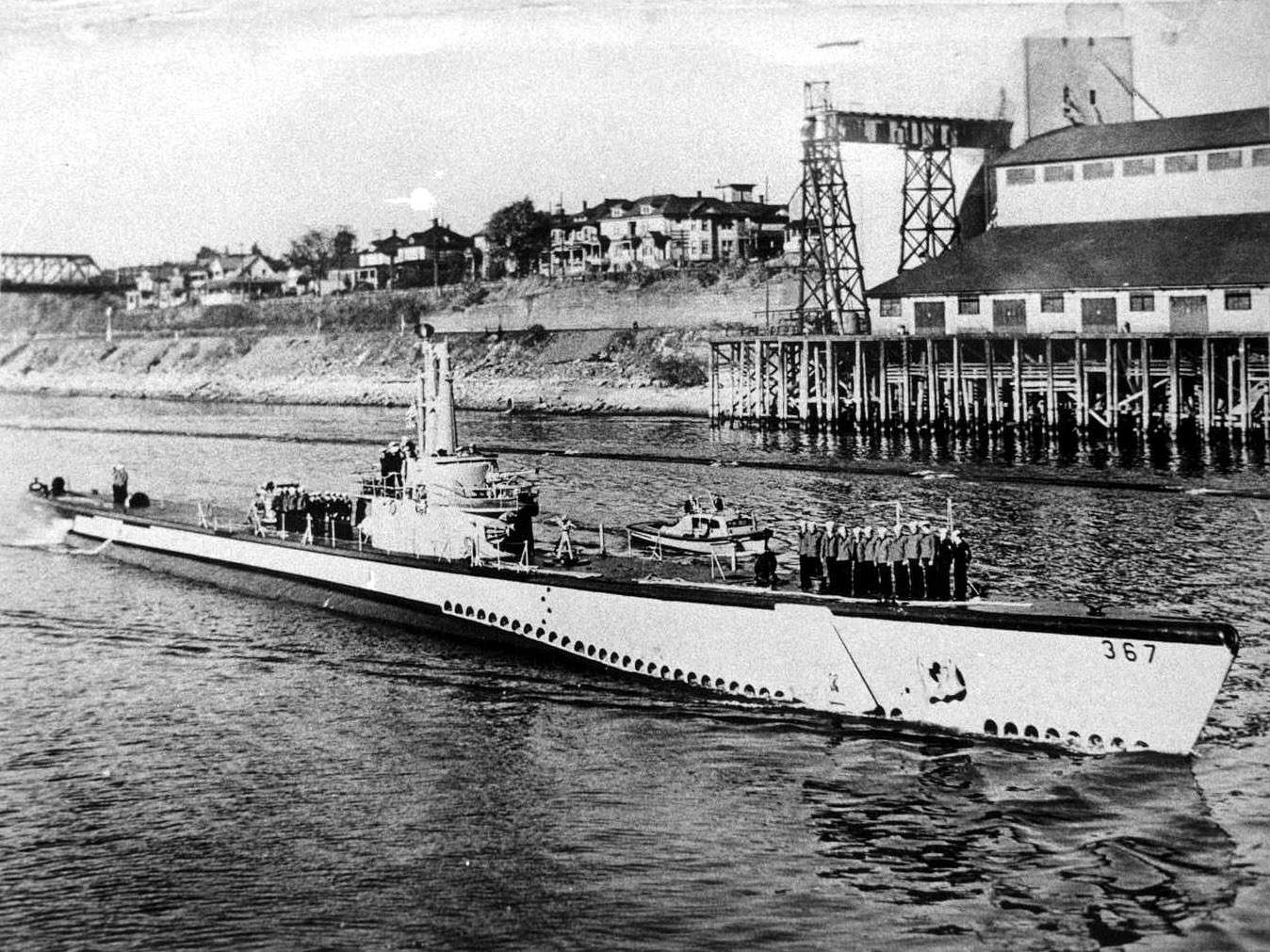
- Icefish (SS-367) Portland, Oregon September 1945

History

United States
- Name: USS Icefish (SS-367)
- Builder: Manitowoc Shipbuilding Co., Manitowoc, Wisconsin
- Laid down: 4 September 1943
- Launched: 20 February 1944
- Commissioned: 10 June 1944
- Decommissioned: 21 June 1946
- Recommissioned: 5 May 1952
- Decommissioned: 29 July 1952
- Recommissioned: 10 December 1952
- Decommissioned: 21 February 1953
- Stricken: 15 July 1971
- Fate: Transferred to the Netherlands, 21 February 1953, sold for scrap, 12 November 1971

Netherlands
- Name: HNLMS Walrus (S802)
- Commissioned: 21 February 1953
- Decommissioned: 15 July 1971
- Fate: Returned to United States custody and sold for scrap, 15 August 1971

General characteristics
- Class & type: Balao class diesel-electric submarine
- Displacement: 1,526 tons (1,550 t) surfaced; 2,424 tons (2,463 t) submerged
- Length: 311 ft 9 in (95.02 m)
- Beam: 27 ft 3 in (8.31 m)
- Draft: 16 ft 10 in (5.13 m) maximum
- Propulsion: 4 × General Motors Model 16-278A V16 diesel engines driving electrical generators; 2 × 126-cell Sargo batteries; 4 × high-speed General Electric electric motors with reduction gears; 2 × propellers; 5,400 shp (4.0 MW) surfaced; 2,740 shp (2.0 MW) submerged
- Speed: 20.25 knots (38 km/h) surfaced; 8.75 knots (16 km/h) submerged
- Range: 11,000 nautical miles (20,000 km) surfaced at 10 knots (19 km/h)
- Endurance: 48 hours at 2 knots (3.7 km/h) submerged; 75 days on patrol
- Test depth: 400 ft (120 m)
- Complement: 10 officers, 70–71 enlisted
- Armament: 10 × 21-inch (533 mm) torpedo tubes; 6 forward, 4 aft; 24 torpedoes; 1 × 5-inch (127 mm) / 25 caliber deck gun; Bofors 40 mm and Oerlikon 20 mm cannon

USS Icefish (SS-367), a Balao-class submarine, was a ship of the United States Navy named for the icefish, any member of the family Salangidae, small smeltlike fishes of China and Japan. These fish are also collectively known as whitebait.

== Construction and commissioning ==
Icefish was launched on 20 February 1944 by the Manitowoc Shipbuilding Companyat Manitowoc, Wisconsin, sponsored by Mrs. Stanley P. Mosely, wife of Captain Mosely, and commissioned on 10 June 1944.

== First patrol, September – November 1944 ==
After trials and diving tests in Lake Michigan, voyages down the Mississippi, and shakedown out of New Orleans, Icefish joined the Pacific Fleet at Pearl Harbor 22 August. Assigned to Vice Admiral Charles A. Lockwood's Pacific Fleet Submarines Force, she joined "Banister's Beagle's" (consisting of Comdr. Alan B. Banister in Sawfish (SS-276) and Drum (SS-228)) and departed 9 September on her first war patrol which took her into Luzon Straits and the South China Sea.

October 1944 was a peak month in the war of U.S. submarines on Japanese shipping: 322,265 tons were sunk, and almost one-third of that total consisted of tankers. In October Icefish and Drum together sank 26,901 tons of enemy shipping in "Convoy College", code name for the area extending across the East China Sea from Luzon Strait to Formosa and the coast of China. Icefish sank a 4,000-ton cargo vessel on 23 October and on 26 October she was credited with sinking a transport of 10,000 tons. She terminated her first war patrol at Majuro, Marshall Islands, 13 November.

== Second and third patrols, December 1944 – April 1945 ==
Icefish departed Majuro 8 December on her second war patrol in company with Spot (SS-413) and Balao (SS-285). This patrol lasted 43 days with no results and she was forced to return to Pearl Harbor 20 January 1945 due to materiel difficulties.

The third war patrol began 20 February when she departed Pearl Harbor with Sawfish and Kingfish (SS-234). This patrol was also conducted in the East China Sea, northeast and east of Formosa. As the war was coming to an end and Japanese shipping had dwindled away largely due to the "Silent Service", Icefish's third war patrol terminated after 60 days at Apra Harbor, Guam.

== Fourth and fifth patrols, May – August 1945 ==
Her fourth war patrol was conducted in the Hainan, Hong Kong, Formosa, Siam Gulf, and Java Sea areas. This patrol lasted 46 days with no contacts.

Instead Icefish carried out another very useful function of U.S. Navy submarines during the later stages of the war. On 7 June with a PBY Catalina for air cover, she rescued six Army aviators off the coast of Formosa. Icefish arrived Fremantle 4 July for refit and sailed 29 July for her fifth war patrol. En route to station 7 August a small diesel lugger of 15 tons was intercepted. The crew consisted of two Japanese, two Eurasians, and five Chinese. One Japanese jumped overboard rather than be captured; the rest were taken on board Icefish. The lugger was sunk by gunfire.

Icefish arrived Tanapag Harbor, Saipan, 22 August 1945, thus ending her fifth and last war patrol. She departed Saipan 1 September arriving San Francisco 18 September. Icefish decommissioned at Mare Island 21 June 1946 and joined the Reserve Fleet.

Icefish received four battle stars for World War II service.

== HNLMS Walrus (S802) ==
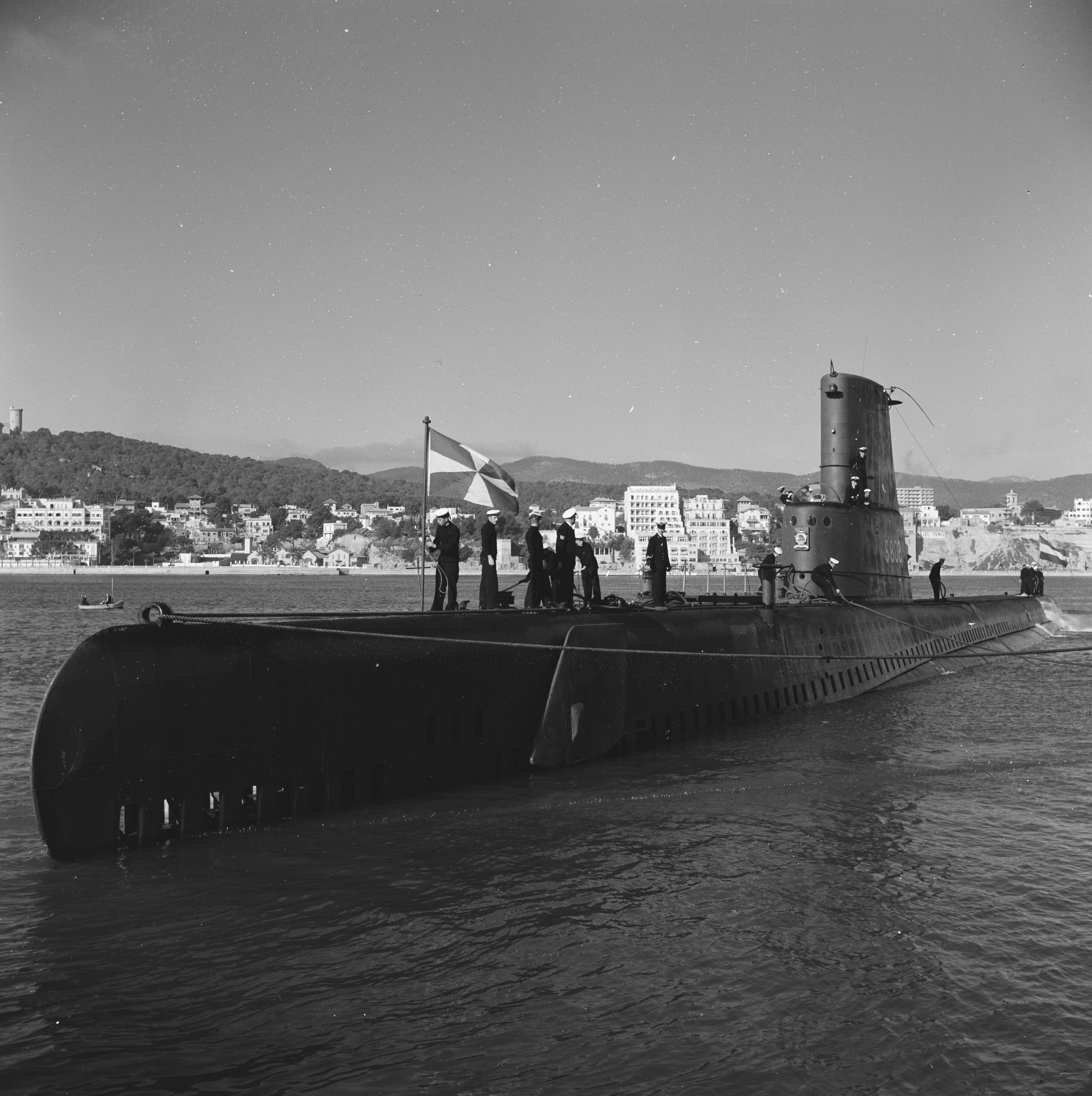
HNLMS Walrus in 1956

Recommissioned at Mare Island 5 June 1952, Icefish transited the Canal Zone and arrived Groton, Conn., 14 July. She decommissioned there 29 July 1952 and received a GUPPY IB conversion. Recommissioned 10 December 1952 at Groton, she remained in that area conducting various tests until 21 February 1953 when she was decommissioned and transferred to the Netherlands. She was commissioned in the Royal Netherlands Navy as HNLMS Walrus (S802), the first of that name.

At the start of 1962 Walrus was sent to Dutch New Guinea to relieve HNLMS Zeeleeuw, which was in dire need of maintenance. For more than half a year the boat patrolled the waters near Dutch New Guinea. In 1966 she was docked at RDM.

Formally returned to US Navy custody, she was struck from the US Naval Register, 15 July 1971, and sold for scrapping, 15 August 1971.
