= Thomas 35 =

Sailboat class

Development
- Designer: Graham & Schlageter
- Location: United States
- Year: 1988
- Builders: Thomas Marine; Tartan Marine
- Role: Racer-Cruiser
- Name: Thomas 35

Boat
- Displacement: 9,800 lb (4,445 kg)
- Draft: 6.83 ft (2.08 m)

Hull
- Type: monohull
- Construction: fiberglass
- LOA: 35.42 ft (10.80 m)
- LWL: 30.50 ft (9.30 m)
- Beam: 11.50 ft (3.51 m)
- Engine: Yanmar 3GM 27 hp (20 kW) diesel engine

Hull appendages
- Keel: fin keel
- Ballast: 4,450 lb (2,018 kg)
- Rudder: skeg-mounted/internally-mounted spade-type/transom-mounted rudder

Rig
- Rig type: Bermuda rig
- I foretriangle height: 48.00 ft (14.63 m)
- J foretriangle base: 14.25 ft (4.34 m)
- P mainsail luff: 48.00 ft (14.63 m)
- E mainsail foot: 15.00 ft (4.57 m)

Sails
- Sailplan: fractional rigged sloop or masthead sloop
- Mainsail area: 360.00 sq ft (33.445 m^{2})
- Jib/genoa area: 342.00 sq ft (31.773 m^{2})
- Total sail area: 702.00 sq ft (65.218 m^{2})

The Thomas 35, also called the T-35, is a sailboat that was designed by American nautical architects Graham & Schlageter as a racer-cruiser and first built in 1988. It was named as Sailing World's Boat of the Year for 1990.

== Production ==
The design was initially built by Thomas Marine of Arlington Heights, Illinois, starting in 1988 and later by Tartan Marine in Painesville, Ohio, United States, but it is now out of production.

== Design ==
The Thomas 35 is a recreational keelboat, built predominantly of fiberglass, with wood trim. It has a fractional sloop, with some later production boats supplied with a masthead sloop rig. The hull has a raked stem, a reverse transom, an internally mounted tiller-controlled spade-type rudder, and a fixed fin keel. The boat displaces 9,800 lb (4,445 kg), carries 4,450 lb (2,018 kg) of lead ballast, and has a draft of 6.83 ft (2.08 m). Designed hull speed is 7.4 kn (13.7 km/h).

The boat is fitted with an auxiliary 27 hp (20 kW) Yanmar 3GM diesel engine. The fuel tank holds 20 U.S. gallons (76 L; 17 imp gal) and the fresh water capacity is 35 U.S. gallons (130 L; 29 imp gal).

The boat can sleep eight, with a double "V"-berth in the bow cabin, two straight settee berths and two additional upper pilot berths in the main cabin, and two aft cabins with a single berths. The head is located just aft of the bow cabin on the port side and includes a shower. An L-shaped galley is to port of the companionway ladder, and is equipped with a two-burner stove, an ice box and a sink. A navigation station is opposite the galley, on the starboard side. Cabin headroom is 74 in (188 cm).

== See also ==
- List of sailing boat types
