= Tartan 33 =

1979–1984 American recreational keelboat

Development
- Designer: Sparkman & Stephens
- Location: United States
- Year: 1979
- No. built: 201
- Builder: Tartan Marine
- Name: Tartan 33

Boat
- Displacement: 10,000 lb (4,536 kg)
- Draft: 4.56 ft (1.39 m)

Hull
- Type: Monohull
- Construction: Fiberglass
- LOA: 33.67 ft (10.26 m)
- LWL: 28.83 ft (8.79 m)
- Beam: 10.96 ft (3.34 m)
- Engine: Universal 5242 24 hp (18 kW) diesel engine

Hull appendages
- Keel: Scheel keel
- Ballast: 4,400 lb (1,996 kg)
- Rudder: internally-mounted spade-type rudder

Rig
- General: Fractional rigged sloop
- I foretriangle height: 39.00 ft (11.89 m)
- J foretriangle base: 12.50 ft (3.81 m)
- P mainsail luff: 41.75 ft (12.73 m)
- E mainsail foot: 13.75 ft (4.19 m)

Sails
- Mainsail area: 287.03 sq ft (26.666 m^{2})
- Jib/genoa area: 243.75 sq ft (22.645 m^{2})
- Total sail area: 530.78 sq ft (49.311 m^{2})

The Tartan 33 is a recreational keelboat. About 220 were built by Tartan Marine in the United States between 1979 and 1984.

Designed by Sparkman & Stephens, it has a Scheel keel and a fractional rig, and performance is similar to other boats of its type. Its mainsail is slightly over 300 square feet. The cockpit is better for cruising than racing, given its size. It has a hull speed of 7.19 kn (13.32 km/h).

In the cabin, the V-berth is separated from the main cabin by the head, which includes a shower. A large double quarterberth is found aft of the nav station.
