= USS Spot =

Submarine of the United States

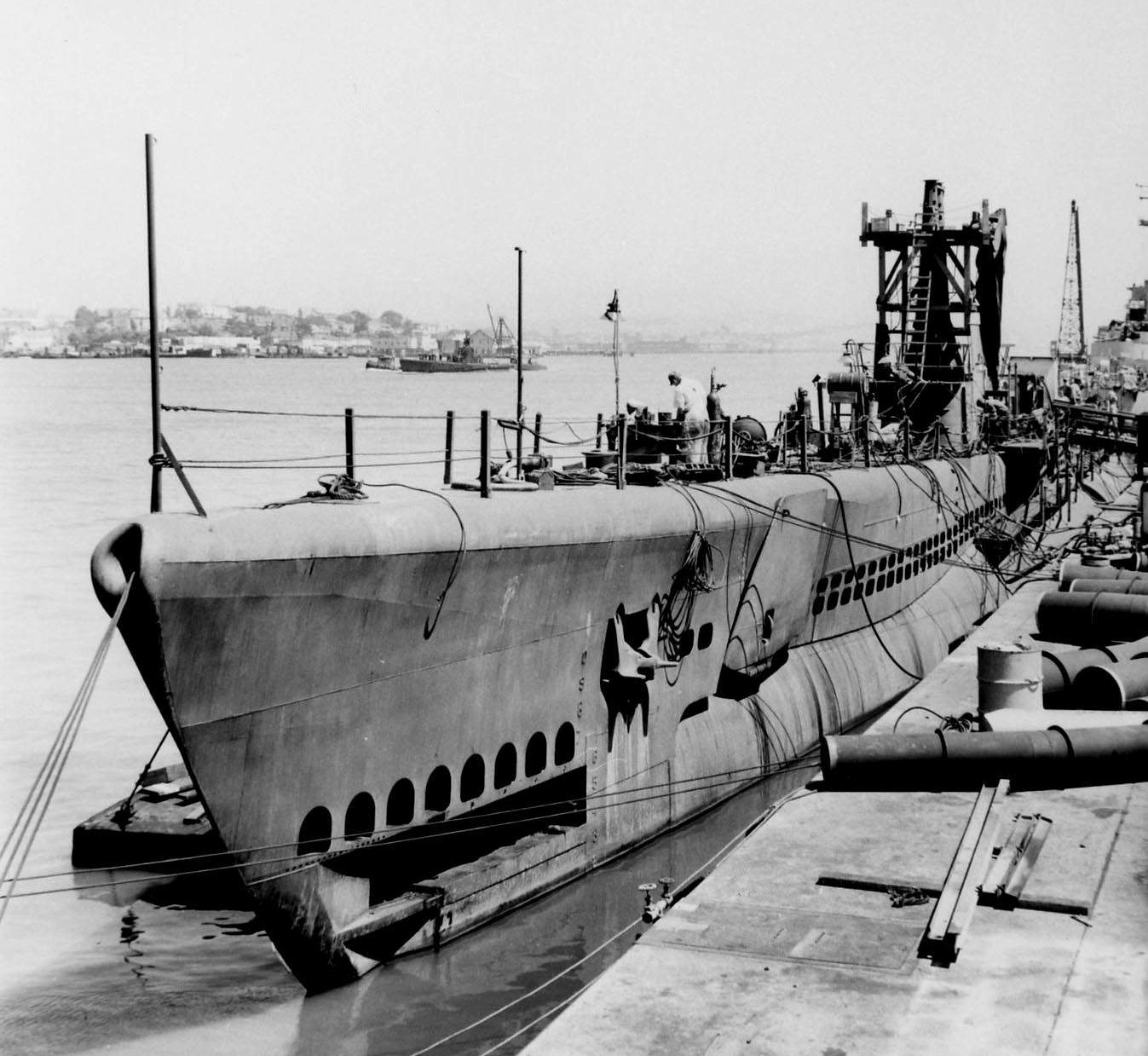
- USS Spot at her berthing dock, one month before commissioned

History

United States
- Name: Spot
- Ordered: 9 July 1942
- Builder: Mare Island Naval Shipyard
- Laid down: 24 August 1943
- Launched: 19 May 1944
- Commissioned: 3 August 1944
- Decommissioned: 19 June 1946
- Recommissioned: 19 August 1961
- Decommissioned: 12 January 1962
- Stricken: 1 August 1975
- Identification: Hull number: SS-413
- Fate: Transferred to Chile, 12 January 1962

Chile
- Name: Simpson
- Acquired: 12 January 1962
- Decommissioned: 1982
- Identification: Pennant number: SS-21

General characteristics
- Class & type: Balao class diesel-electric submarine
- Displacement: 1,525 tons (1,550 t) surfaced; 2,424 tons (2,463 t) submerged
- Length: 311 ft 10 in (95.05 m)
- Beam: 27 ft 4 in (8.33 m)
- Draft: 16 ft 10 in (5.13 m) maximum
- Propulsion: 4 × Fairbanks-Morse Model 38D8-1/8 10-cylinder opposed piston diesel engines driving electrical generators; 2 × 126-cell Sargo batteries; 4 × high-speed General Electric electric motors with reduction gears; two propellers; 5,400 shp (4.0 MW) surfaced; 2,740 shp (2.0 MW) submerged
- Speed: 20.25 knots (38 km/h) surfaced; 8.75 knots (16 km/h) submerged
- Range: 11,000 nautical miles (20,000 km) surfaced at 10 knots (19 km/h)
- Endurance: 48 hours at 2 knots (3.7 km/h) submerged; 75 days on patrol
- Test depth: 400 ft (120 m)
- Complement: 10 officers, 70–71 enlisted
- Armament: 10 × 21-inch (533 mm) torpedo tubes; 6 forward, 4 aft; 24 torpedoes; 1 × 5-inch (127 mm) / 25 caliber deck gun; Bofors 40 mm and Oerlikon 20 mm cannon

USS Spot (SS-413) was a Balao-class submarine of the United States Navy, named after the spot, a small sciaenoid Atlantic coast food fish, with a black spot behind its shoulders.

== Construction and commissioning ==
Spot was laid down on 24 August 1943 by the Mare Island Navy Yard at Vallejo, California. She was launched on 19 May 1944, sponsored by Mrs. A. A. Gieselmann, and commissioned on 3 August 1944, Commander William S. Post, Jr., in command.

== U.S. Navy service ==
=== September–November 1944 ===
Spot completed fitting out at Mare Island on 18 September 1944 and moved to San Diego for shakedown. After a yard period, Spot departed for Hawaii and arrived at Pearl Harbor on 14 November 1944.

=== First patrol, December 1944 – January 1945 ===
Accompanied by Balao (SS-285), Spot got underway for the Marianas on 4 December. They were joined by Icefish (SS-367) en route, and the trio arrived at Saipan on 15 December 1944.

Two days later, the hunter-killer group headed for the Yellow Sea. On 7 January 1945, Spot sank two small trawlers with her deck gun. Four days later, she destroyed a small freighter by gunfire. On 13 January off Shanghai, the submarine sank two trawlers by shellfire, and she repeated the feat the next day. In a night sweep through the Elliott Islands on 18 and 19 January, Spot torpedoed a cargo ship and a tanker.

As Spot came down the west coast of Korea, she sighted a small ship and fired her last three torpedoes. All ran shallow and missed. With only 1,300 rounds of 20 mm ammunition remaining, the submarine closed to 800 yards (730 m) and opened fire. The enemy made an unsuccessful attempt to ram. No one manned the Japanese ship's machine gun atop her pilot house; her top deck was in shambles; and the ship was dead in the water but not sinking.

Spot waited for an hour and then sent over a boarding party of seven men to plant demolition charges and search for intelligence material. After about ten minutes on board, the party had to abandon as the ship listed to port and sank by the stern. The boarding party was recovered and one Japanese prisoner taken. The submarine returned to Midway on 30 January for a refit and training period.

=== Second war patrol, February – March 1945 ===
On 24 February, Spot began her second war patrol which took her, Queenfish (SS-393), and Sea Fox (SS-402) into the East China Sea. On the second night in her assigned patrol area, Spot expended all torpedoes attacking a Japanese convoy. They sank the passenger-cargo ship, Nanking Maru, and damaged a freighter. The attack was made in heavy weather and shallow water. Spot was surfaced and heading for deeper water but could not elude one of the escorts, the minesweeper W-17, which closed to 4,200 yards (3,800 m) and opened fire. Spot manned her guns and returned the fire even though she was wallowing heavily in the rough seas. A lucky hit by her 5-inch (130 mm) gun knocked out W-17's forward gun and saved the submarine from almost certain disaster. Spot secured her guns, cleared the bridge, and submerged. The escort dropped a few depth charge patterns which caused no damage, and the submarine returned to Saipan on 23 March to reload.

On 27 March 1945, Spot resumed her patrol. On 31 March 1945, she was on the surface in the Philippine Sea 425 nautical miles (787 km; 489 mi) southeast of Kagoshima, Kyushu, Japan at 29°14′N 137°18′E when she sighted a destroyer that offered no recognition signals. Spot maneuvered to close when the destroyer turned towards her and increased its speed. When the range was approximately 5,500 yards (5,000 m), the destroyer opened fire. Spot fired a recognition flare that the destroyer answered with a second salvo. As Spot submerged, another salvo straddled her conning tower. After Spot reached a depth of 450 feet (137 m), she and the destroyer exchanged recognition signals and the destroyer discontinued its attack. The destroyer was later identified as USS Case (DD-370), which reported firing fifteen 5-inch (127 mm) rounds. Spot suffered no damage or casualties in this friendly fire incident.

=== Third and fourth war patrols, April – July 1945 ===
During the first week of April, Spot guarded the approaches to Kii Suido. After aircraft from the Fast Carrier Task Force sank battleship Yamato, a cruiser, and four destroyers in the East China Sea on 7 April, the submarine patrolled in that area. She hunted off the China coast and then conducted a reconnaissance of Kokuzan To, off Korea and decided to shell a radio station on the northwest tip of the island. On the evening of 25 April, she surfaced and began the bombardment which hit an oil storage area, several barracks, and set the radio station on fire. Spot returned to the Mariana Islands on 4 May for refit.

Spot began her last war patrol on 2 June and performed lifeguard services off the coast of Honshū until 23 June. She then patrolled in the East China and Yellow Seas, sinking two junks by gunfire before returning to Saipan on 18 July. The submarine sailed for Hawaii the next day.

Spot arrived at Pearl Harbor on 29 July for an extended overhaul and was still there when hostilities ceased. She sailed for San Diego on 27 August and provided services for antisubmarine warfare units there from 3 September 1945 to 2 March 1946. The ship then sailed to San Francisco to prepare for inactivation. She was decommissioned at the Mare Island Naval Shipyard on 19 June and attached to the Pacific Reserve Fleet.

=== Honors and awards ===
Spot received four battle stars for World War II service.

== Chilean Navy service ==
In January 1961, Spot was towed to Pearl Harbor for modernization in preparation for transfer to the Chilean Navy. Unusually for a post-World War II submarine, her deck gun was retained.

The Chilean crew reported aboard later in 1961 for training, and on 12 January 1962, Spot was loaned to that government under the Military Assistance Loan Program. She was renamed Simpson (SS-21), in honor of Rear Admiral Robert Winthrop Simpson (1799–1877) of the Chilean Navy. The submarine arrived in Chile on 23 April 1962. On 1 August 1975 the submarine was sold outright to Chile, and struck from the US Navy Directory.

In 1980, Simpson was used extensively by director Kinji Fukasaku in the Japanese film Virus. The film features spectacular footage of Simpson operating in the Antarctic.

Simpson was significant for being one of the last submarines to have a deck gun; she was disposed of by the Chilean Navy in 1982.

== Sources ==
- This article incorporates text from the public domain Dictionary of American Naval Fighting Ships. The entries can be found here and here.
- This article incorporates public domain material from USS SPOT - War History. National Archives and Records Administration.
- Friedman, Norman (1995). U.S. Submarines Through 1945: An Illustrated Design History. Annapolis, MD: Naval Institute Press. ISBN 9781557502636.
- Bauer, K. Jack; Roberts, Stephen S. (1991). Register of ships of the U.S. Navy, 1775-1990: major combatants. New York: Greenwood Press. ISBN 9780313262029.
