= Robert Manry =

- Robert Manry and Tinkerbelle on the cover of his 1967 book
- Born: June 2, 1918; Landour, India
- Died: February 21, 1971 (aged 52); Union City, Pennsylvania
- Occupation: Copy editor
- Known for: Sailing single-handed across the Atlantic Ocean in a tiny sailboat

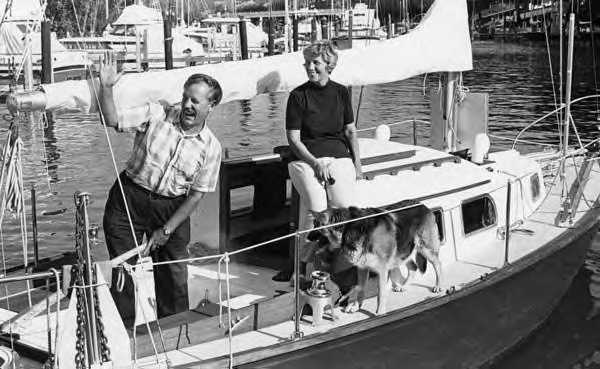
Robert and Virginia Manry aboard Curlew

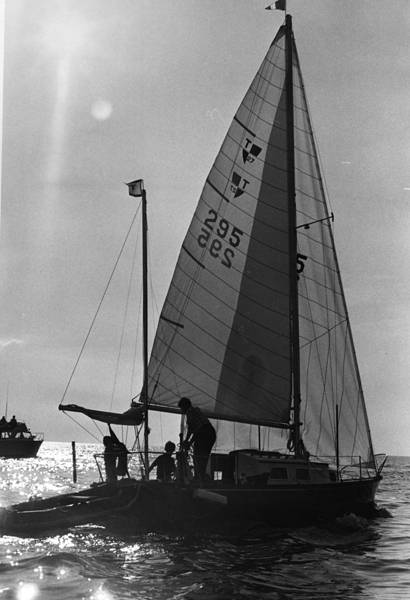
Robert and Virginia Manry aboard Curlew

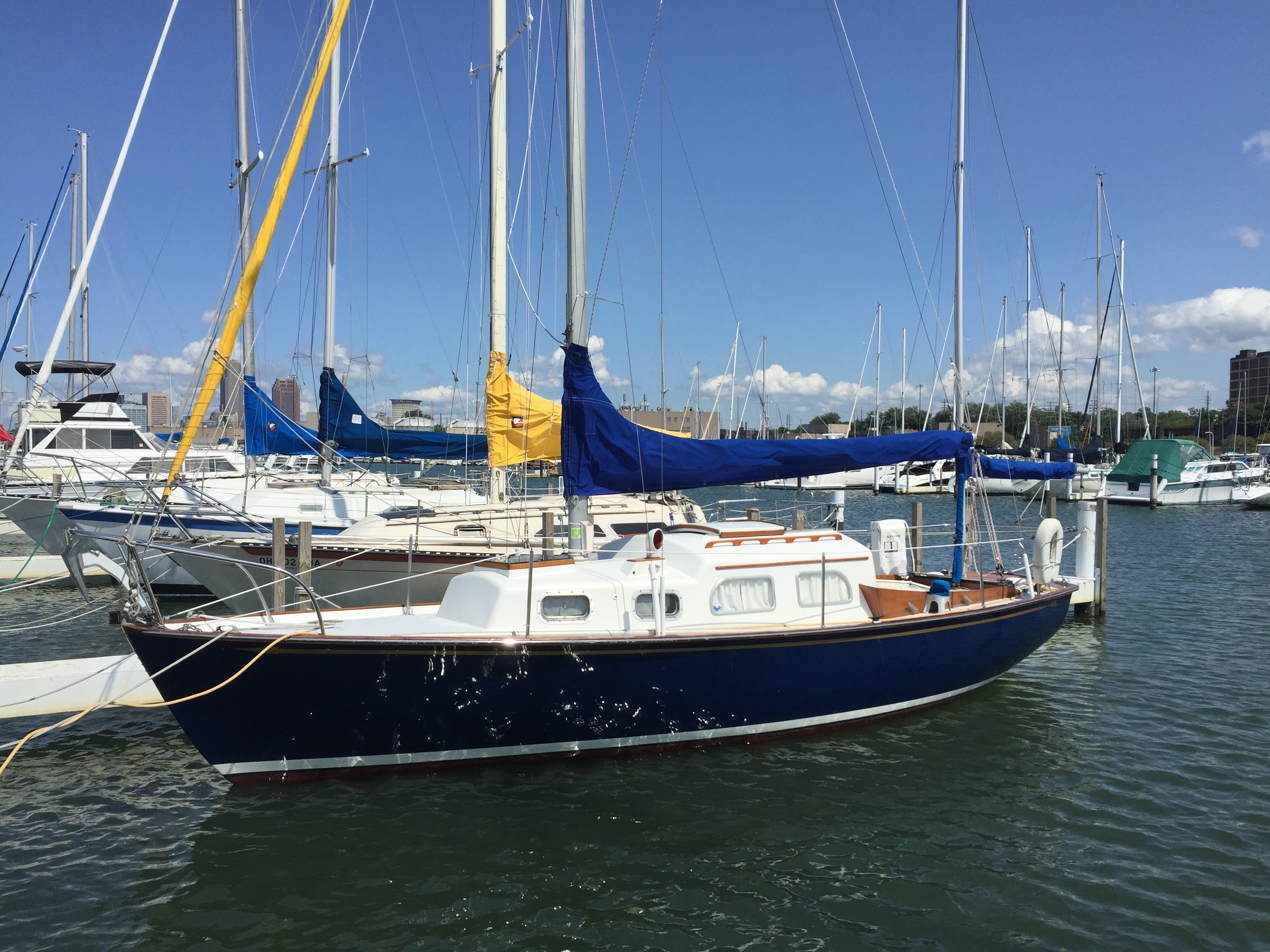
Curlew in 2017

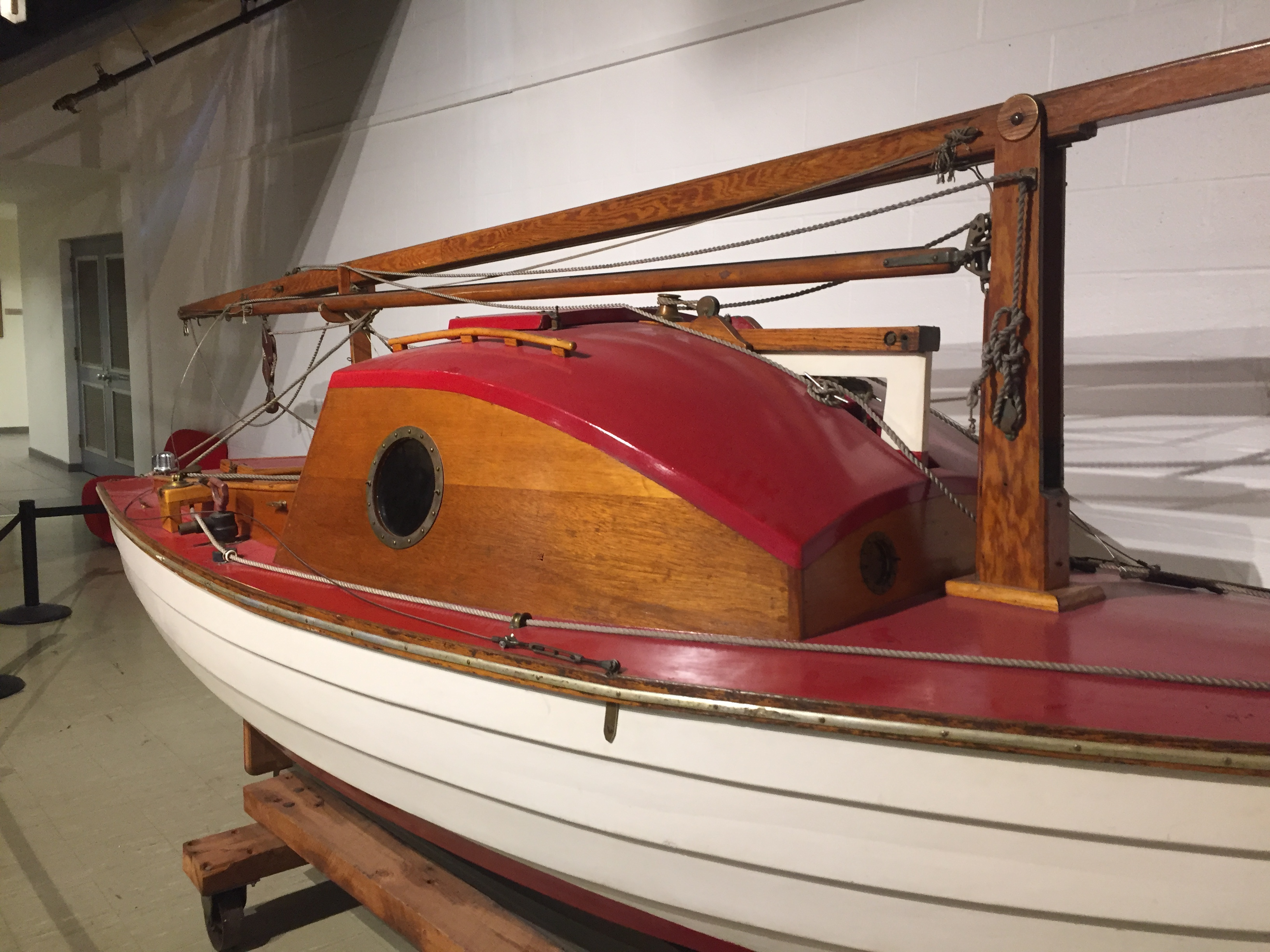
Tinkerbelle at the Western Reserve Historical Museum in 2017

Robert Neal Manry (b. Mussoorie, Uttarakhand, India, June 2, 1918 – d. Union City, Pennsylvania, February 21, 1971) was a copy editor of the Cleveland Plain Dealer who in 1965 sailed from Falmouth, Massachusetts, to Falmouth, Cornwall, England, in a tiny 13.5-foot (4.1 m) sailboat (an Old Town "Whitecap" built by the Old Town Canoe Co. of Old Town, Maine, which he had extensively modified for the voyage) named Tinkerbelle. Beginning on June 1, 1965, and ending on August 17, the voyage lasted 78 days.

At the time, Tinkerbelle was the shortest but not the smallest boat to make a non-stop trip across the Atlantic Ocean (till today the smallest is Lindemann's folding kayak). Manry later wrote about the voyage and its preparation in his book Tinkerbelle, in which the sailor expressed shock and surprise at the huge crowds and armada of small boats that greeted his arrival in Falmouth. It is estimated that scores of journalists, the Royal Navy, a fleet of 300 boats as well as 50,000 people on shore (along with Falmouth's mayor, Sam Hooper) greeted Manry upon his landing ashore.

After completing his voyage on Tinkerbelle, Manry purchased Curlew, a 1967 Tartan 27 Yawl. He then set out with his wife, son, daughter, German shepherd, and cat on a cruise from Cleveland, Ohio, through the Great Lakes, down the Mississippi river, through the Gulf to the Bahamas, up the east coast of the US and ultimately back to Cleveland.

Manry died February 21, 1971, from a heart attack in Union City, Pennsylvania.

A small park in Willowick, Ohio—the town where he lived before his journey—is named after him. Tinkerbelle is on display at the Western Reserve Historical Society in Cleveland, Ohio.

== Bibliography ==
- Manry, Robert. Tinkerbelle. New York: Harper & Row and London: Collins, 1967.
