= Tartan 27 =

Popular U.S. keelboat design from 1961

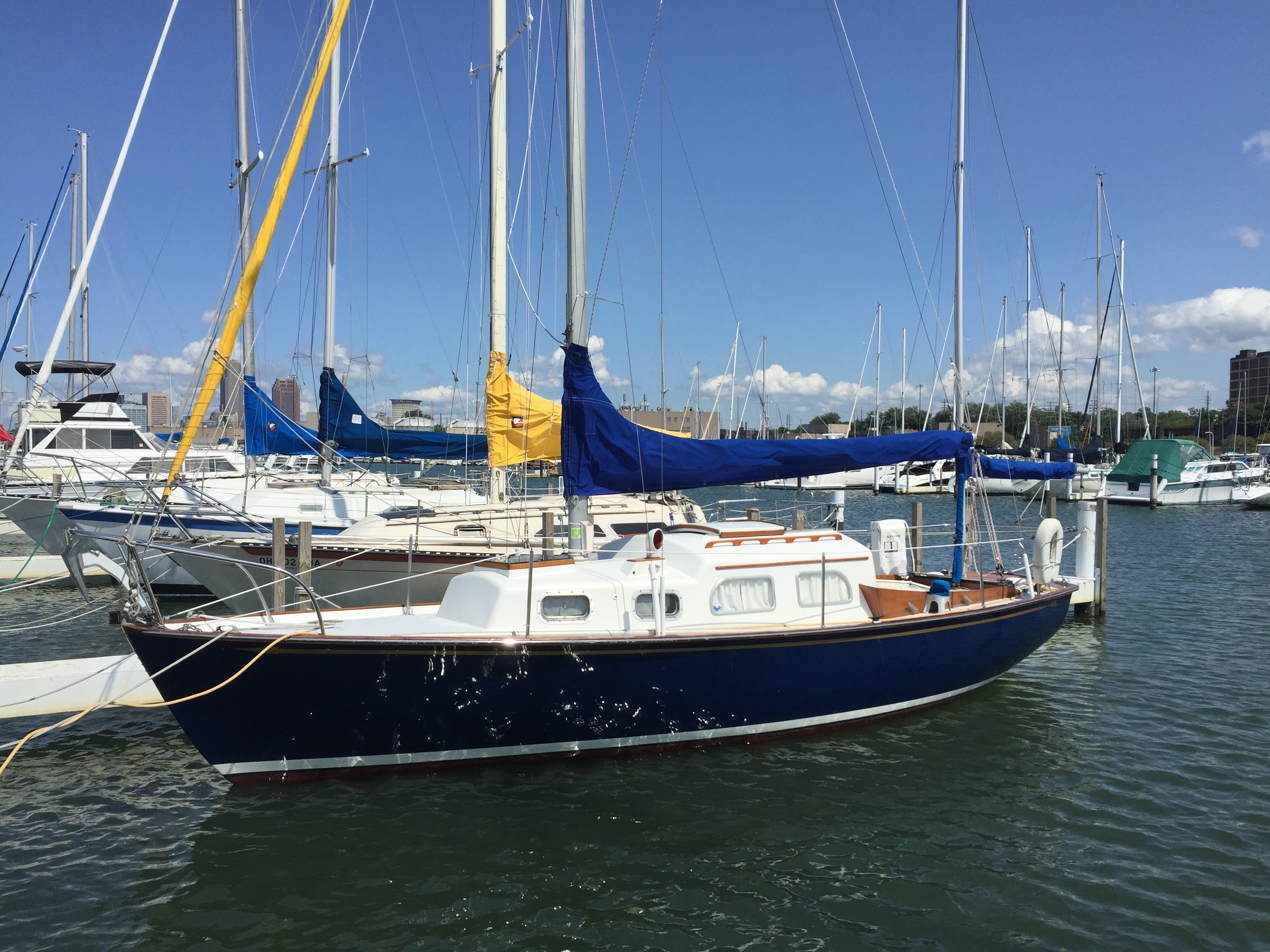

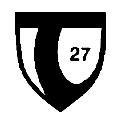

Development
- Designer: Sparkman & Stephens
- Location: United States
- Year: 1961
- No. built: 712
- Builders: Douglass & McLeod; Tartan Marine; W. D. Schock Corp
- Role: Cruiser-racer
- Name: Tartan 27

Boat
- Displacement: 7,400 lb (3,357 kg)
- Draft: 6.33 ft (1.93 m) with centerboard down

Hull
- Type: monohull
- Construction: fiberglass
- LOA: 27.00 ft (8.23 m)
- LWL: 21.42 ft (6.53 m)
- Beam: 8.58 ft (2.62 m)
- Engine: Universal Atomic 4 30 hp (22 kW) gasoline engine

Hull appendages
- Keel: modified long keel with cutaway forefoot, plus centerboard
- Ballast: 2,400 lb (1,089 kg)
- Rudder: keel-mounted rudder

Rig
- Rig type: Bermuda rig
- I foretriangle height: 34.65 ft (10.56 m)
- J foretriangle base: 9.83 ft (3.00 m)
- P mainsail luff: 30.50 ft (9.30 m)
- E mainsail foot: 13.50 ft (4.11 m)

Sails
- Sailplan: masthead sloop
- Mainsail area: 205.88 sq ft (19.127 m^{2})
- Jib/genoa area: 170.30 sq ft (15.821 m^{2})
- Total sail area: 376.18 sq ft (34.948 m^{2})

The Tartan 27 is a recreational keelboat built from 1961 by Douglass & McLeod and then by Tartan Marine from 1971 to 1980. W. D. Schock Corp also built 24 between 1964 and 1968 in their California plant to serve the US west coast market. In all, 712 were built.

It is Sparkman & Stephens' design No. 1617. The fiberglass hull has a keel-mounted rudder controlled by a tiller and a fixed modified long keel with a cutaway forefoot. It has a draft of 6.33 ft (1.93 m) with the centerboard extended and 3.17 ft (0.97 m) with it retracted. It has a hull speed of 6.2 kn (11.5 km/h).

Later models added ballast, lengthened the cockpit, increased the bridge deck distance, and added interior teak.

Various interior layouts were used. Typically, it has sleeping accommodation for four, with a double "V"-berth, and an L-shaped settee in the main cabin around a drop-down dinette table. The galley is located on the starboard side amidships and is equipped with a two-burner stove, an ice box and a sink. The head is located just aft of the bow cabin on the port side.

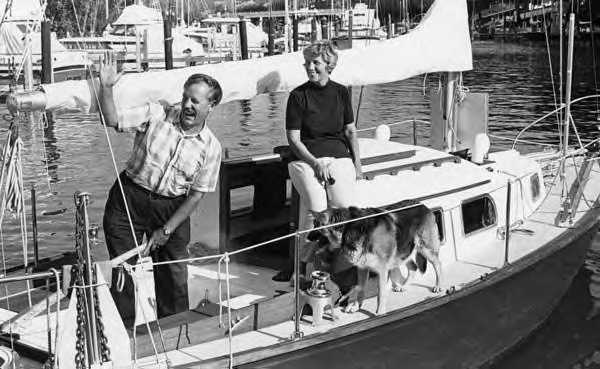
Robert and Virginia Manry onboard Curlew

It has a masthead sloop rig. In 1961 about 25 were built with a yawl rig. It has a shorter main mast and a mizzen mast with a sail of 36.86 sq ft (3.424 m^{2}) mounted in the lazarette.

In 1967-1968 Robert Manry completed the Great Loop in his 1967 Tartan 27 Yawl.
