= Willowick, Ohio =

- City
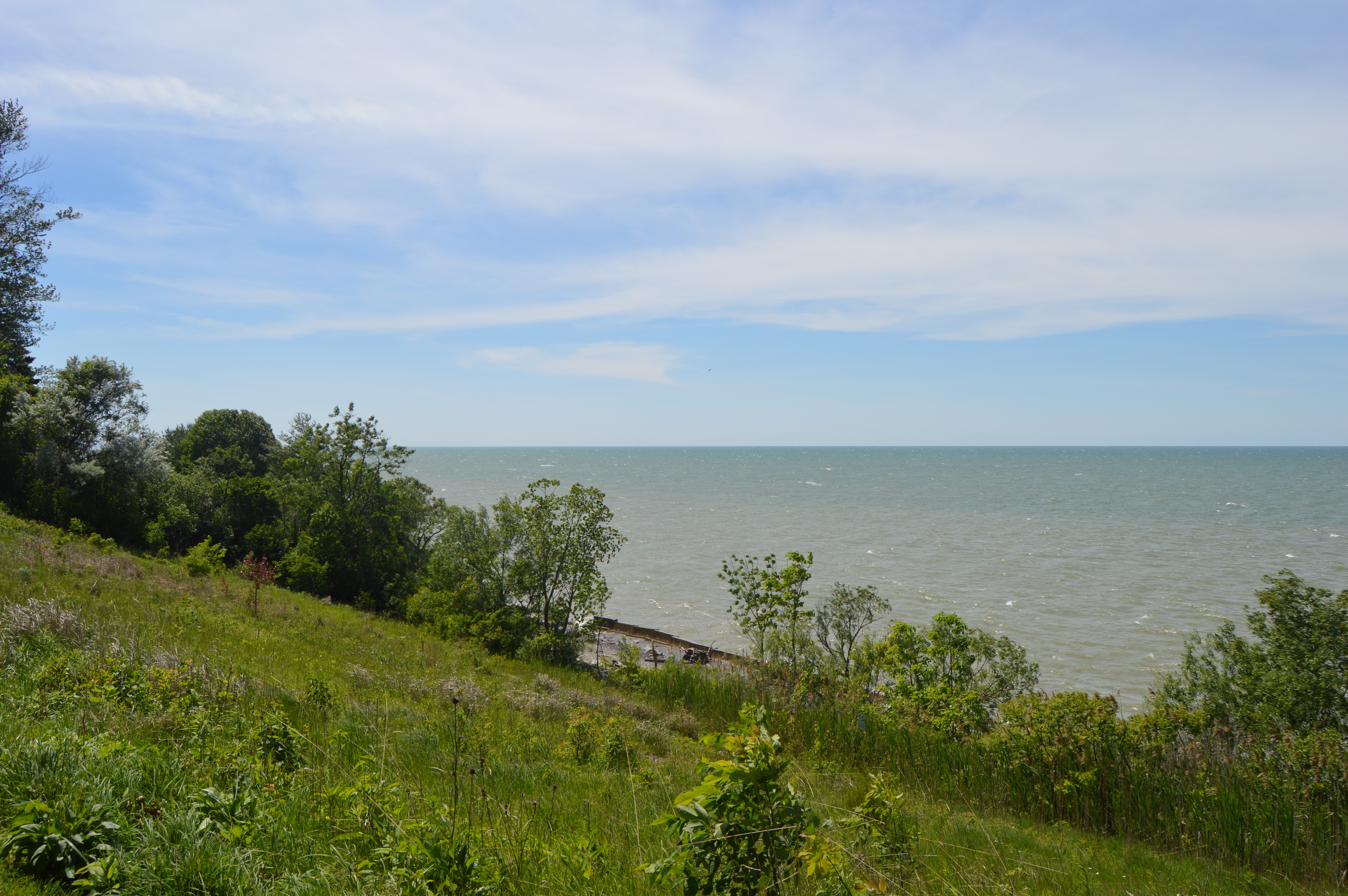
- Lake Erie shoreline looking west from Lakefront Lodge Metropark
- Motto: "Great Living on a Great Lake"
- Location of Willowick in Greater Cleveland

- Location within Ohio Location within the United States
- Coordinates: 41°38′6″N 81°28′6″W
- Country: United States
- State: Ohio
- County: Lake
- Incorporated: 1924

Government
  - Mayor: Michael Vanni (R)

Area
  - Total: 2.54 sq mi (6.57 km^{2})
  - Land: 2.54 sq mi (6.57 km^{2})
  - Water: 0 sq mi (0.00 km^{2})
- Elevation: 623 ft (190 m)

Population (2020)
  - Total: 14,204
  - Density: 5,599.1/sq mi (2,161.83/km^{2})
- Time zone: UTC-5 (Eastern (EST))
  - Summer (DST): UTC-4 (EDT)
- ZIP codes: 44092, 44094, 44095
- Area code: 440
- FIPS code: 39-85638
- GNIS feature ID: 1086437
- Website: www.cityofwillowick.com

Willowick is a city in Lake County, Ohio, United States, on Lake Erie. The population was 14,204 at the 2020 census. A suburb of Cleveland, Willowick is served by a branch of the Willoughby-Eastlake Public Library. The city's name is a portmanteau of two adjacent cities, Willoughby and Wickliffe. As of 2022, the mayor of Willowick is Michael Vanni.

== Geography ==
Willowick is located at 41°38′6″N 81°28′6″W (41.635080, -81.468290).

According to the United States Census Bureau, the city has a total area of 2.54 square miles (6.58 km^{2}), all land.

== Demographics ==
Historical population
Census	Pop.	Note	%±
1930	667		—
1940	915		37.2%
1950	3,677		301.9%
1960	18,749		409.9%
1970	21,237		13.3%
1980	17,758		−16.4%
1990	15,269		−14.0%
2000	14,361		−5.9%
2010	14,171		−1.3%
2020	14,204		0.2%
2025 (est.)	14,178		−0.2%

94% spoke English, 1.9% Croatian, 1.0% Slovene, and 1.0% Spanish.

=== 2020 census ===
As of the 2020 census, Willowick had a population of 14,204. The median age was 41.9 years. 19.4% of residents were under the age of 18 and 18.7% of residents were 65 years of age or older. For every 100 females there were 93.6 males, and for every 100 females age 18 and over there were 90.5 males age 18 and over.

100.0% of residents lived in urban areas, while 0.0% lived in rural areas.

There were 6,348 households in Willowick, of which 25.1% had children under the age of 18 living in them. Of all households, 39.2% were married-couple households, 20.6% were households with a male householder and no spouse or partner present, and 31.8% were households with a female householder and no spouse or partner present. About 33.5% of all households were made up of individuals and 14.3% had someone living alone who was 65 years of age or older.

There were 6,671 housing units, of which 4.8% were vacant. The homeowner vacancy rate was 1.3% and the rental vacancy rate was 7.0%.

Racial composition as of the 2020 census
Race	Number	Percent
White	12,308	86.7%
Black or African American	868	6.1%
American Indian and Alaska Native	20	0.1%
Asian	128	0.9%
Native Hawaiian and Other Pacific Islander	5	0.0%
Some other race	68	0.5%
Two or more races	807	5.7%
Hispanic or Latino (of any race)	365	2.6%

=== 2010 census ===
As of the census of 2010, there were 14,171 people, 6,110 households, and 3,859 families residing in the city. The population density was 5,579.1 inhabitants per square mile (2,154.1/km^{2}). There were 6,476 housing units at an average density of 2,549.6 per square mile (984.4/km^{2}). The racial makeup of the city was 95.0% White, 2.5% African American, 0.1% Native American, 0.8% Asian, 0.2% from other races, and 1.3% from two or more races. Hispanic or Latino of any race were 1.3% of the population.

There were 6,110 households, of which 27.5% had children under the age of 18 living with them, 45.0% were married couples living together, 13.0% had a female householder with no husband present, 5.2% had a male householder with no wife present, and 36.8% were non-families. 31.2% of all households were made up of individuals, and 14.2% had someone living alone who was 65 years of age or older. The average household size was 2.32 and the average family size was 2.91.

The median age in the city was 41.5 years. 20.9% of residents were under the age of 18; 7.4% were between the ages of 18 and 24; 26.5% were from 25 to 44; 26.2% were from 45 to 64; and 19.1% were 65 years of age or older. The gender makeup of the city was 48.4% male and 51.6% female.

=== 2000 census ===
As of the census of 2000, there were 14,361 people, 6,101 households, and 4,112 families residing in the city. The population density was 5,709.2 inhabitants per square mile (2,204.3/km^{2}). There were 6,272 housing units at an average density of 2,493.4 per square mile (962.7/km^{2}). The racial makeup of the city was 97.85% White, 0.75% African American, 0.05% Native American, 0.61% Asian, 0.03% from other races, and 0.71% from two or more races. Hispanic or Latino of any race were 0.71% of the population. 18.7% were of Italian, 16.0% German, 12.5% Irish, 9.3% Polish and 7.9% Slovene ancestry according to Census 2000.

There were 6,101 households. 25.4% of the households had children under the age of 18 living with them, 52.5% were married couples living together, 11.1% had a female householder with no husband present, and 32.6% were non-families. 28.3% of all households were made up of individuals non-familial related, and 14.2% had someone living alone who was 65 years of age or older. The average household size was 2.35 and the average family size was 2.90.

The city's age population was spread out, with 21.2% under the age of 18, 6.3% aged 18 to 24, 29.4% aged 25 to 44, 21.2% aged 45 to 64, and 21.9% who were 65 years of age or older. The median age was 41 years. For every 100 females, there were 91.8 males. For every 100 females aged 18 and over, there were 87.2 males.

The median income per household in the city was $44,107 and the median income for a family was $52,675. Males had a median income of $38,966 versus $27,297 for females. The per capita income for the city was $22,053. About 3.2% of families and 4.5% of the population were below the poverty line, including 6.6% of those under age 18 and 4.9% of those age 65 or over.

== Government ==
Willowick has a mayor-council system of government. As of 2024, the mayor is Michael J. Vanni, a Republican. The City Council consists of seven members, who are elected for four-year terms. One member is elected by the city at-large, and six members are elected from three wards (two members from each ward). As of 2024, the members of the City Council are as follows:

Willowick City Council
Seat	Name	Party
Council-at-Large	Monica Koudela	Unaffiliated
Ward 1	Patrick Mohorcic	Republican
Ward 1	Devon McFarland	Democrat
Ward 2	Natalie J. Antosh	Democrat
Ward 2	Theresa Bisbee	Republican
Ward 3	Charlie Malta	Republican
Ward 3	David Phares	Republican

== Education ==
Public education in the city is administered by Willoughby-Eastlake City School District. Public schools located with the city of Willowick are Royalview Elementary School and Willowick Middle School, both of which occupy the same campus.

Willowick has a public library, a branch of Willoughby-Eastlake Public Library.

== Notable people ==
- Tom Bukovac, session musician
- Bob Golic, WNIR radio host, NFL player, actor
- Mike Golic, football player and radio host
- Robert Manry, sailed across the Atlantic Ocean in the Tinkerbelle
