= Hannes Lindemann =

German doctor, navigator and sailor

Hannes Lindemann (28 December 1922 – 17 April 2015) was a German doctor, navigator and sailor. He made two solo transatlantic crossings, one in a sailing dugout canoe made while working in Liberia and the second in a 17-foot Klepper Aerius II double folding kayak, modified to carry two masts and an outrigger. His book Alone at Sea documents the trips, which were totally unassisted. He was motivated to make the trips by an interest in how the human body and mind respond to survival at sea, a theme which the Kon-Tiki (1947) and Alain Bombard (1952) explored in earlier ocean voyages.

His kayak was delivered to the Canary Islands, before sailing to the Caribbean. He very rarely paddled, though used a paddle when rudders broke. He carried 154 pounds (70 kg) of supplies, much of it canned comestibles, some of which he ditched on setting out as the kayak was too heavy. He caught fish and gathered rainwater to supplement his rations. The 3,000-mile (4,800 km) crossing to Saint Maarten took him 72 days. Towards the end of that trip he encountered storms of "wind force 8, gusting to force 9" when he capsized twice during a period of hallucinations brought on by fatigue and sleep deprivation. At times he described what might be described as tantric or altered states – safe in the cocoon of his sodden kayak while storms raged around him for days. He was convinced that in a survival situation the mind gave up long before the body (or indeed the craft), and to help accomplish the second trip he trained himself in sleep deprivation as well as mentally, which he described at times as prayer, meditation, autogenic training and ingraining his sub-conscious with affirmational mottos like "I will make it" and "Keep going west".

In the light of these experiences, Lindemann concluded that Alain Bombard had been supplied with fresh water and some other food supplies on two occasions, and could not have survived on salt-water and fish, as claimed.

== See also ==
- Sea kayak
- Klepper kayak
- Folding kayak
