= Mackerel-class submarine =

Submarine class

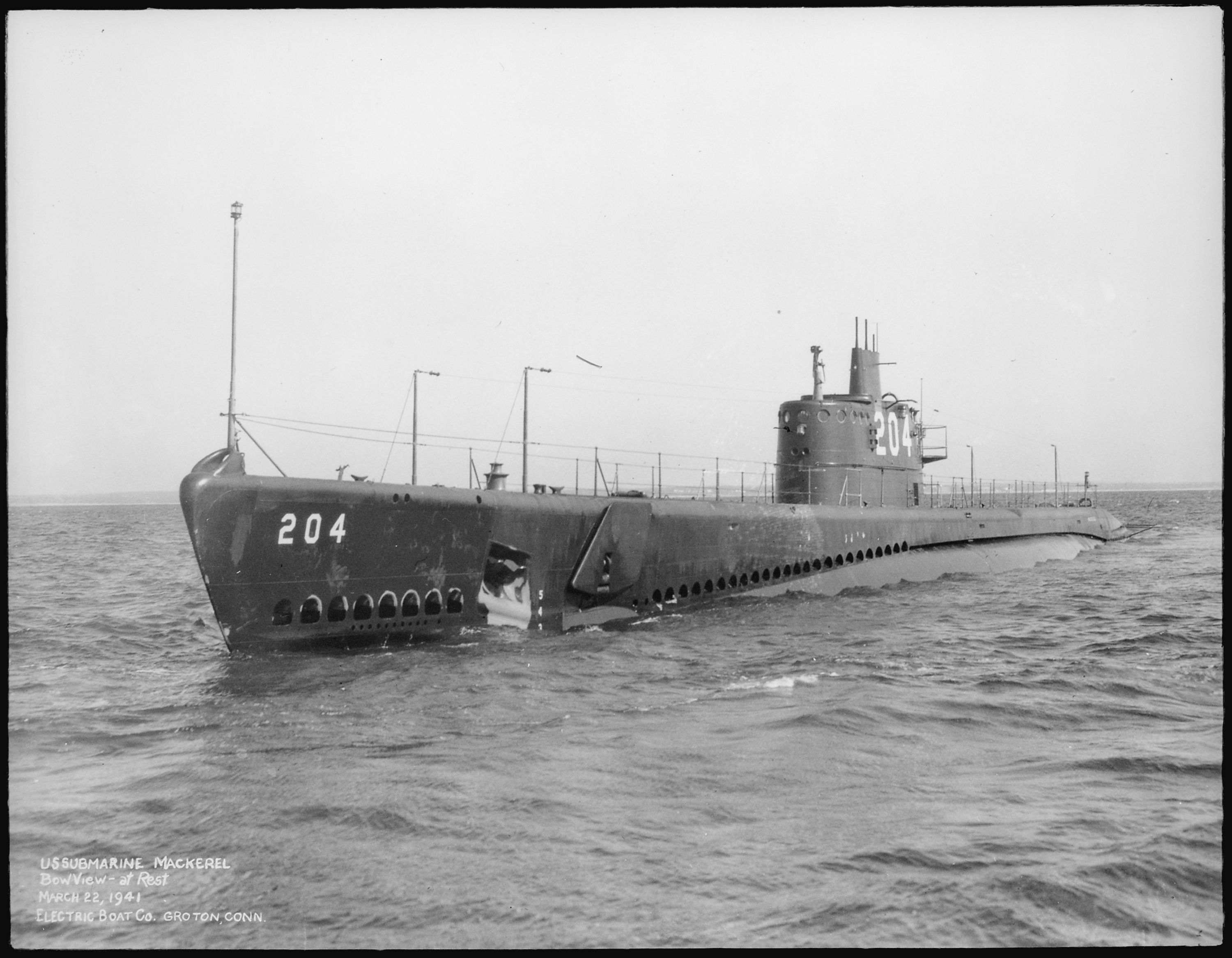
- USS Mackerel (SS-204)

Class overview
- Name: Mackerel class
- Builders: Electric Boat Company; Portsmouth Naval Shipyard
- Operators: United States Navy
- Preceded by: Tambor class
- Succeeded by: Gato class
- Built: 1939–1941
- In commission: 1941–1945
- Completed: 2
- Retired: 2

General characteristics (Mackerel)
- Type: Diesel and electric submarine
- Displacement: 825 tons (838 t) surfaced; 1,190 tons (1,209 t) submerged
- Length: 243 ft 1 in (74.09 m)
- Beam: 22 ft 1 in (6.73 m)
- Draft: 13 ft 0 1/4 in (3.969 m)
- Propulsion: 2 × Electric Boat direct drive diesel engines; 2 × 60-cell Sargo batteries; 2 × Electro Dynamic electric motors; 2 shafts; 1,680 bhp (1,250 kW) surfaced; 1,500 bhp (1,100 kW) submerged
- Speed: 16 knots (30 km/h) surfaced; 11 knots (20 km/h) submerged
- Range: 6,500 nautical miles (12,000 km) at 10 knots (19 km/h) (service)
- Test depth: 250 ft (76 m)
- Complement: 4 officers, 33 enlisted
- Armament: 6 × 21-inch (533 mm) torpedo tubes; (four forward, two aft); 12 torpedoes; 1 × 3-inch (76 mm)/50 caliber deck gun

General characteristics (Marlin)
- Type: Diesel-electric submarine
- Displacement: 800 tons (813 t) standard, surfaced; 1165 tons (1184 t) submerged
- Length: 238 ft 11 in (72.82 m)
- Beam: 21 ft 7 1/4 in (6.585 m)
- Draft: 13 ft 0 1/4 in (3.969 m)
- Propulsion: 2 × ALCO diesel engines driving electrical generators; 2 × 60-cell Sargo batteries; 2 × General Electric electric motors; 2 shafts; 1,700 bhp (1,300 kW) surfaced; 1,500 bhp (1,100 kW) submerged
- Speed: 14.5 knots (27 km/h) surfaced; 9 knots (17 km/h) submerged
- Range: 7,400 nautical miles (13,700 km) at 10 knots (19 km/h)
- Test depth: 250 ft (76 m)
- Complement: 4 officers, 34 enlisted
- Armament: 6 × 21-inch (533 mm) torpedo tubes; (four forward, two aft); 12 torpedoes; 1 × 3-inch (76 mm)/50 caliber deck gun

The Mackerel-class submarines were a pair of experimental prototype submarines built just prior to World War II and launched in 1940 and 1941. The two submarines were similar in size and capability to the S-class submarines built at the end of World War I, and had been ordered to test the feasibility of using mass production techniques to build small submarines. Until at least 1940 it was thought that mass production of fleet submarines would be impractical, and in any case small submarines could provide area defense for submarine bases. Once it became apparent that there would be sufficient production of the more capable Gato-class submarines, interest in the design waned and no additional small submarines were ordered. Submarine production standardized during the war on the Gato class and its successors, the Balao and Tench-class submarines. In some references, the Mackerels are called the "M class".

== Design ==
The Mackerels stemmed from design studies ordered by the Navy's General Board beginning in 1936, when Admiral Thomas C. Hart joined the Board and spearheaded the small submarine effort. At the time it was felt that mass production of large fleet submarines would be impractical. It was also felt necessary to replace the aging S, R, and O-class submarines, to provide area defense for submarine bases and operate in restricted waters. For the Mackerels, two somewhat different designs were produced by the Electric Boat Company and Portsmouth Navy Yard. As prototypes, Mackerel and Marlin were near-sisters rather than sisters. References agree that Mackerel used a direct drive propulsion arrangement, but differ as to whether Marlin had direct drive or diesel-electric drive. Both had engine designs not used in other US Navy submarines; Mackerel an in-house Electric Boat design, Marlin an ALCO locomotive design. By late 1941 it became apparent that fleet submarines could be mass-produced, and interest in small submarines began to wane. Interest in them was revived with the examination of the German U-570, a Type VII U-boat captured by the British and loaned to the US. Also, Admiral Hart returned to the General Board in late 1942, following a courageous part in the ultimately futile defense of the Philippines and Indonesia in 1941-42. He pointed out that no other navy had abandoned small submarines. However, Admiral Frederick J. Horne, Vice Chief of Naval Operations, felt that small submarines should only be built if there was no interference with fleet submarine production. With all submarine yards capable of building fleet submarines, there was no easy way to avoid impacting their production, so the small submarine was abandoned as a concept.

== Service ==
Both submarines spent their entire careers operating from Submarine Base New London, Connecticut and Portsmouth Navy Yard in training and research roles, contributing to the development of both submarine and antisubmarine warfare in World War II. On 12 April 1942 Mackerel was attacked by a German U-boat while transiting to Norfolk, Virginia, but the torpedoes missed and Mackerel's counter-attack was unsuccessful. Marlin appeared as the fictional Corsair in the 1943 movie Crash Dive, filmed at Submarine Base New London. After the war, both boats were decommissioned in November 1945 and scrapped in 1946-47.

== Boats in class ==
Construction data
Name	Hull number	Builder	Laid down	Launched	Commissioned	Fate
Mackerel	SS-204	Electric Boat, Groton, Connecticut	6 October 1939	28 September 1940	31 March 1941	Scrapped 1947
Marlin	SS-205	Portsmouth Navy Yard, Kittery, Maine	28 May 1940	29 January 1941	1 August 1941	Scrapped 1946

== See also ==
- List of submarine classes of the United States Navy
- List of lost United States submarines
- List of submarines of the Second World War

Equivalent submarines of the same era

- O 21 class
- T class
- Brin class
- Orzeł class
- Aurore class
- S class
- Type VII
