= USS Mackerel (SS-204) =

Submarine of the United States

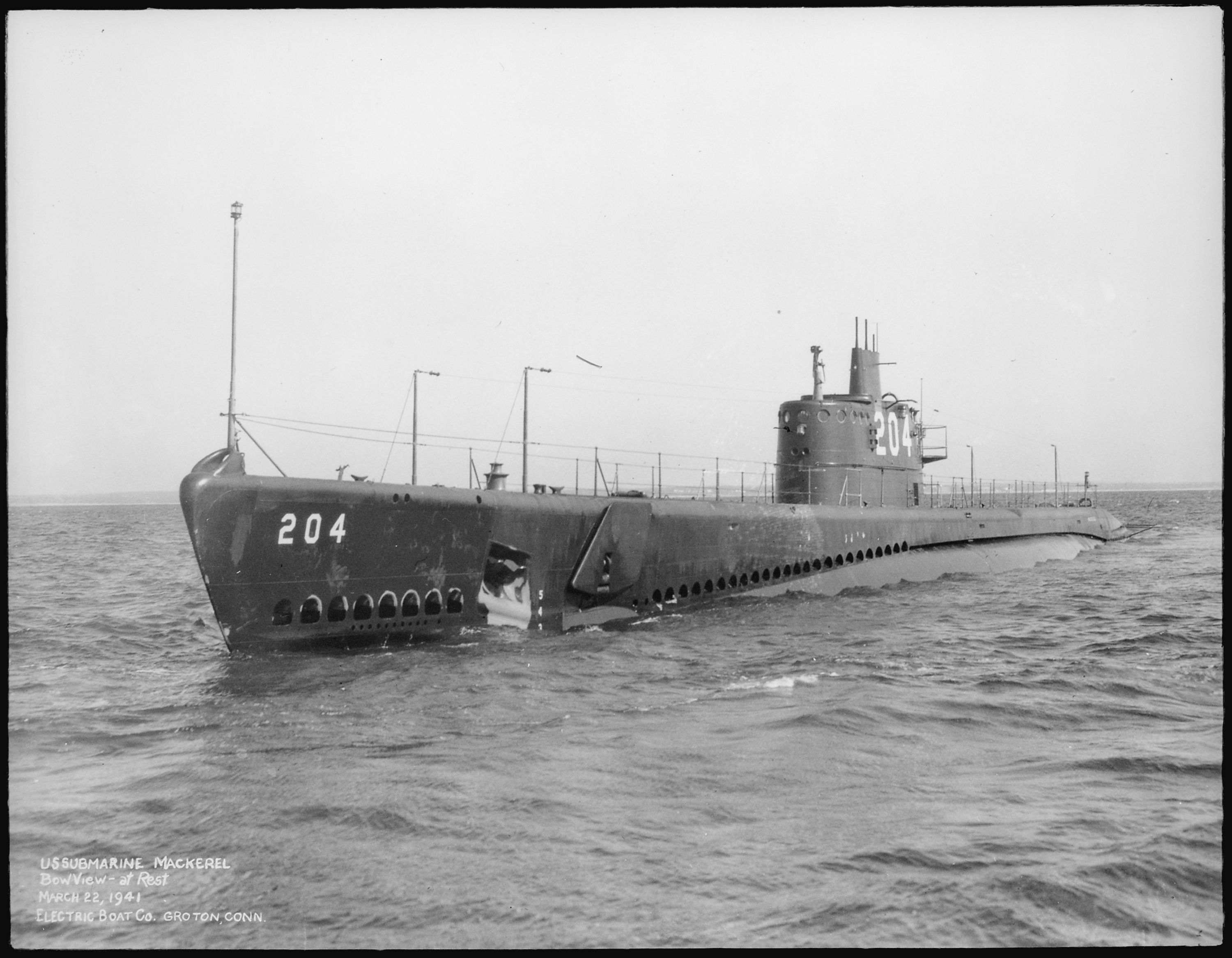
- Mackerel on 22 March 1941.

History

United States
- Name: Mackerel
- Namesake: Mackerel
- Builder: Electric Boat Company, Groton, Connecticut
- Laid down: 6 October 1939
- Launched: 28 September 1940
- Commissioned: 31 March 1941
- Decommissioned: 9 November 1945
- Stricken: 28 November 1945
- Fate: Sold for scrap, 24 April 1947

General characteristics
- Class & type: Mackerel-class submarine
- Displacement: 825 tons (838 t) surfaced; 1,190 tons (1,209 t) submerged
- Length: 243 ft 1 in (74.09 m)
- Beam: 22 ft 1 in (6.73 m)
- Draft: 13 ft ¼ in (4.0 m)
- Propulsion: 2 × Electric Boat direct drive diesel engines; 2 × 60-cell Sargo batteries; 2 × Electro Dynamic electric motors; 2 shafts; 1,680 bhp (1,250 kW) surfaced; 1,500 bhp (1,100 kW) submerged
- Speed: 16 knots (30 km/h) surfaced; 11 knots (20 km/h) submerged
- Range: 6,500 nautical miles (12,000 km) at 10 knots (19 km/h) (service)
- Test depth: 250 ft (76 m)
- Complement: 4 officers, 33 enlisted
- Armament: 6 × 21 in (533 mm) torpedo tubes; (four forward, two aft); 12 torpedoes; 1 × 3 inch (76 mm)/50 caliber deck gun

USS Mackerel (SS-204), the lead ship of her class of submarines, was the first ship of the United States Navy named for the mackerel. Mackerel and her near-sister Marlin (designed and built by Portsmouth Navy Yard) were prototype small submarines which the Navy was exploring to replace the aging S-class submarines.

== Construction ==
Her keel was laid down on 6 October 1939, at the Electric Boat Company of Groton, Connecticut. She was launched on 28 September 1940, sponsored by Mrs. Cora Furlong (née Glover), wife of Rear Admiral William R. Furlong, Chief of the Bureau of Ordnance, and commissioned on 31 March 1941.

== Wartime service ==
Throughout World War II, Mackerel, assigned to Submarine Squadron 1 at New London, Connecticut, participated in the training and improvement of the U.S. Navy's submarine force. Designed as an experimental submarine, she provided support services to the Underwater Sound Laboratory and training services to the Submarine and the Prospective Commanding Officers Schools at New London, in addition to training Allied surface vessels and aircraft in antisubmarine warfare.

Although most of her time was spent in the New London area, she steamed as far north as Casco Bay and as far south as the Chesapeake Bay to conduct antisubmarine training exercises. While in the New London-Narragansett Bay area she often worked with Task Group 28.4, the antisubmarine development detachment, as well as with the Underwater Sound Laboratory, thus aiding, both tactically and technically, in the development of submarine-related knowledge.

On 8 April 1942, an aircraft identified by Mackerel′s crew as a United States Army Air Forces P-38 Lightning fighter mistook Mackerel for a German U-boat and dropped four bombs which straddled her track while she was conducting exercises with the U.S. Navy patrol vessel USS Sapphire (PYc-2) 3 nautical miles (5.6 km; 3.5 mi) south of the Watch Hill buoy off Watch Hill, Rhode Island. The bombs ricocheted 100 feet (30 m) off the water and did not explode. Neither Mackerel or Sapphire, which was 1,000 yards (910 m) off Mackerel′s starboard quarter at the time, suffered damage or casualties.

Mackerel departed New London on 12 April 1942 bound on the surface for Norfolk, Virginia. She was about 100 nautical miles (185 km; 115 mi) off Cape Charles on the coast of Virginia on 14 April when the United States Coast Guard cutter USCGC Legare (WSC-144) sighted her at 20:30. Unaware of plans for Mackerel to be in the area and unsure of her identity, Legare′s crew suspected her of being a German U-boat and closed with her, but established her identity before mounting an attack. Mackerel′s crew accepted Legare′s offer to escort Mackerel the rest of the way to Norfolk, and the two vessels headed for Norfolk at 21:30. By 23:15, Legare was about 2,000 yards (1,830 m) astern of Mackerel when she saw Mackerel make two quick course alterations and changed course herself to conform to Mackerel′s movements. Mackerel′s crew, meanwhile, sighted two torpedoes headed for her and evaded them, then sighted what they believed was a German U-boat on the surface and observed it firing a single torpedo at Legare. Mackerel fired two torpedoes at the U-boat, which outran Mackerel and disappeared into the darkness apparently unscathed. Legare sighted a torpedo headed directly for her which her crew thought Mackerel had fired, and took evasive action, and the torpedo passed down Legare′s port side at a distance of only 20 yards (18 m). Legare lost contact with Mackerel and searched for the U-boat for the next 2 1/2 hours but found no sign of it. A subsequent investigation of the incident by the Eastern Sea Frontier found it impossible to reconcile the reports of the two vessels and concluded that Mackerel had mistakenly fired a torpedo at Legare.

Continuing her voyage toward Norfolk alone after losing contact with Legare, Mackerel again sighted a U-boat at 05:08 on 15 April 1942 near the entrance to the Chesapeake Bay. She fired a torpedo at the U-boat, but observed no indications of a hit, and the U-boat outdistanced her. She signaled the U.S. Navy patrol vessel USS Tourmaline (PY-20), which was on patrol outside the Chesapeake Bay, and reported her sighting. Tourmaline joined Mackerel, but found no evidence of a U-boat in the area. The two purported U-boat sightings on 14 and 15 April 1942 were Mackerel′s only contacts with enemy forces during her career.

After temporary duty with the Fifth Naval District, during which she conducted antisubmarine warfare maneuvers in the Chesapeake Bay with U.S. Army Air Forces and U.S. Navy planes, Mackerel headed back north to resume her duties at New London. At 09:50 on 4 May 1942, she was operating off the coast of Rhode Island when the American tanker El Lago sighted her and mistook her for a German U-boat, and El Lago′s United States Navy Armed Guard detachment opened gunfire on Mackerel about 4 nautical miles (7.4 km; 4.6 mi) south of Watch Hill Light at 41°18′N 071°47′W. Mackerel sustained no damage, and did not require assistance from two U.S. Navy patrol boats and a United States Army tug sent to her aid.

At the end of the war, Mackerel was ordered to Boston, Massachusetts, where she was decommissioned on 9 November 1945, and struck from the Naval Vessel Register on 28 November 1945. She was sold for scrapping to the North American Smelting Company of Philadelphia, Pennsylvania, on 24 April 1947.

== Awards ==
- American Defense Service Medal
- American Campaign Medal
- World War II Victory Medal

== In popular culture ==
The 1943 World War II submarine movie Crash Dive, starring Tyrone Power, features footage of Mackerel′s sister ship USS Marlin (SS-205) portraying the fictional U.S. Navy submarine USS Corsair, with her conning tower modified to resemble that of Mackerel.

A fictional submarine named USS Mackerel that fought in the Pacific during World War II is featured in the 2005 novel Pride Runs Deep by R. Cameron Cooke. In the concluding historical note the author, a submarine officer, acknowledges the real USS Mackerel (SS-204).
