= Operation Eagle Pull =

Part of the Vietnam War (1975)

- Part of the Vietnam War, the Cambodian Civil War (Fall of Phnom Penh)
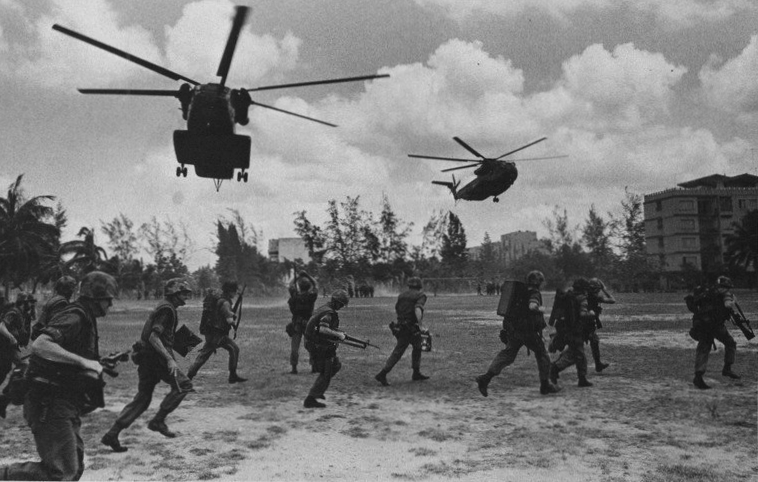
- United States Marines deploy at LZ Hotel on 12 April 1975
Date	12 April 1975
Location	Phnom Penh, Cambodia 11°32′53.16″N 104°55′52.16″E
Result	Successful United States evacuation; US forces airlift 289 people to safety; Khmer Rouge propaganda victory

Belligerents
United States (Cambodia) Khmer Republic	Khmer Rouge

Commanders and leaders
Don Whitmire; John Gunther Dean; Peter Khoy Saukam	Pol Pot

Casualties and losses
2 helicopters damaged	None known

Operation Eagle Pull was the United States military evacuation by air of Phnom Penh, Cambodia, on 12 April 1975. At the beginning of April 1975, Phnom Penh, one of the last remaining strongholds of the Khmer Republic, was surrounded by the Khmer Rouge with the backing of the People's Republic of China (PRC) and totally dependent on aerial resupply through Pochentong Airport. With a Khmer Rouge victory imminent, the US government made contingency plans for the evacuation of US nationals and allied Cambodians by helicopter to ships in the Gulf of Thailand. Operation Eagle Pull took place on the morning of 12 April 1975 and was a tactical success carried out without any loss of life. Five days later the Khmer Republic collapsed and the Khmer Rouge occupied Phnom Penh.

== Strangulation of Phnom Penh ==
At the beginning of 1975 the Khmer Republic, a United States-supported military government, controlled only the Phnom Penh area and a string of towns along the Mekong River that provided the crucial supply route for food and munitions coming upriver from South Vietnam. As part of their 1975 dry season offensive, rather than renewing their frontal attacks on Phnom Penh, the Khmer Rouge set out to cut off the crucial Mekong supply route. On 12 January 1975 the Khmer Rouge attacked Neak Luong, a key Khmer National Armed Forces (FANK) defensive outpost on the Mekong. On 27 January, seven vessels limped into Phnom Penh, the survivors of a 16-ship convoy that had come under attack over the 100 kilometres (62 mi) journey from the South Vietnamese border. On 3 February a convoy heading downriver hit naval mines laid by the Khmer Rouge at Phu My approximately 74 kilometres (46 mi) from Phnom Penh. The FANK naval branch, the Khmer National Navy (MNK), had mine-sweeping capability, but due to the Khmer Rouge control of the riverbanks mine-sweeping was impossible or at best extremely costly. The MNK had lost a quarter of its ships, and 70 percent of its sailors had been killed or wounded.

By 17 February, the Khmer Republic abandoned attempts to reopen the Mekong supply line. In future, all supplies for Phnom Penh would have to come in by air to Pochentong Airport. The United States quickly mobilised an airlift of food, fuel and ammunition into Phnom Penh, but as US support for the Khmer Republic was limited by the Case–Church Amendment, BirdAir, a company under contract to the US government, controlled the airlift with a mixed fleet of C-130 and DC-8 planes, flying 20 times a day into Pochentong.

On 5 March, Khmer Rouge artillery at Toul Leap, north-west of Phnom Penh, shelled Pochentong Airport, but FANK troops recaptured Toul Leap on 15 March and ended the shelling. Khmer Rouge forces continued to close in on the north and west of the city and were soon able to fire on Pochentong again. On 22 March rockets hit two supply aircraft, forcing the US embassy to announce on 23 March a suspension of the airlift until the security situation improved. The embassy, realizing that the Khmer Republic would soon collapse without supplies, reversed the suspension on 24 March and increased the number of aircraft available for the airlift. On 1 April, the Khmer Rouge overran Neak Luong and Ban-am, the last remaining FANK positions on the Mekong. The Khmer Rouge could now concentrate all their forces on Phnom Penh. Premier Lon Nol resigned that day and went into exile; the final collapse of the Khmer Republic was imminent.

== Planning ==
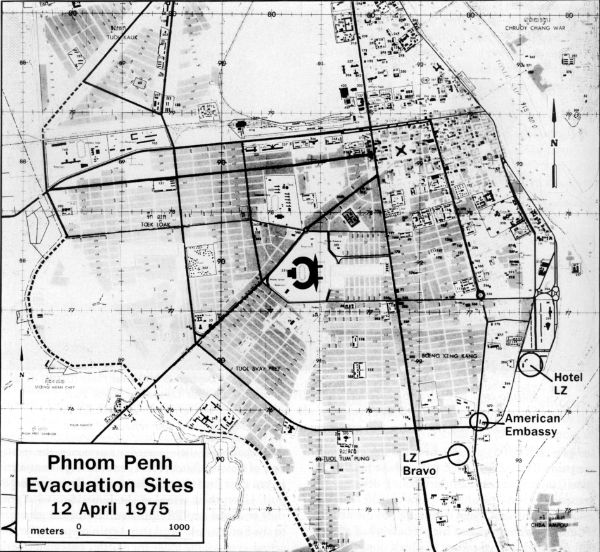
Map of Operation Eagle Pull evacuation sites showing the Embassy and LZ Hotel

The evacuation plan was developed and refined by the US Military as Khmer Rouge forces closed in on Phnom Penh, starting as early as 1973. On 27 June 1973 the Seventh Air Force published Contingency Plan 5060C "Eagle Pull" covering the evacuation of Phnom Penh. Conplan 5060C had three options:

- Option 1: the evacuation of Embassy personnel, US citizens and designated Cambodians by regular or chartered civilian airlift from Pochentong Airport.
- Option 2: if Khmer Rouge action forced the cancellation of civilian flights from Pochentong Airport, security police from the 56th Security Police Squadron at Nakhon Phanom Royal Thai Air Force Base would be flown in to provide security for the evacuation of approximately 600 Embassy personnel, US citizens and designated Cambodians by USAF fixed wing aircraft (and CH-53 and HH-53 helicopters if needed).
- Option 3: if Pochentong was closed to traffic the 56th Security Police Squadron would be landed to secure landing zones (LZs) in central Phnom Penh (and other towns if required) for use by CH-53 helicopters of the 21st Special Operations Squadron and HH-53 helicopters of the 40th Aerospace Rescue and Recovery Squadron with airborne mission command performed by C-130 King aircraft of the 56th Aerospace Rescue and Recovery Squadron.

Option 3 was later revised to provide for the use of USMC helicopters together with USAF helicopters and C-130 Airborne Mission Command based in Thailand, and for the ground security force to be made up of marines rather than air force security police. The LZs were to be adjacent to the US Embassy in Phnom Penh.

On 6 January 1975, CINCPAC placed the 31st Marine Amphibious Unit on 96-hour alert to move the evacuation fleet into position off Kampong Som (previously Sihanoukville) in the Gulf of Thailand for the implementation of Operation Eagle Pull. On 6 February the reaction time was reduced to 48 hours, meaning that the evacuation fleet had to maintain a 48-hour cruising radius from Kampong Som. This was further reduced on 28 February to 24 hours, effectively meaning that the fleet had to remain within the Gulf of Thailand.

On 21 March the Embassy predicted there would be 3,600 evacuees, far exceeding the original estimate of approximately 400. This necessitated the development of a new evacuation plan whereby Marines would secure Pochentong Airport, while helicopters would ferry evacuees from central Phnom Penh to Pochentong from where they would be flown on C-130 planes to Thailand. However, this plan was quickly overtaken by events as the supply C-130s coming into Pochentong were used for evacuees on the return journey, quickly reducing the number of evacuees that would need to be moved in a final evacuation.

On 3 April, given the deterioration in the defences around Phnom Penh, Ambassador John Gunther Dean requested the deployment of the 10-man Operation Eagle Pull command element which landed at Pochentong on a BirdAir C-130 plane. The command element supervised the ongoing fixed-wing evacuation of more than 750 Cambodians over the next seven days in the face of 80–90 rounds of 105 mm artillery and 107 mm rocket fire each day. By 10 April Khmer Rouge fire had become so heavy that the fixed-wing evacuation was ended.

The command group then turned its attention to the selection of helicopter landing zones for the evacuation. As the Khmer Rouge controlled the east bank of the Mekong opposite Phnom Penh, the command group selected LZ Hotel, a soccer field about 900 metres (3,000 ft) north-east of the embassy. Masked from the river by a row of apartment buildings, this LZ could not be interdicted by direct fire weapons, making it the safest location. The embassy staff prepared to leave on 11 April, but the evacuation was delayed until the following day in order to allow USS Hancock to join the evacuation fleet off Kampong Som.

== Evacuation fleet ==
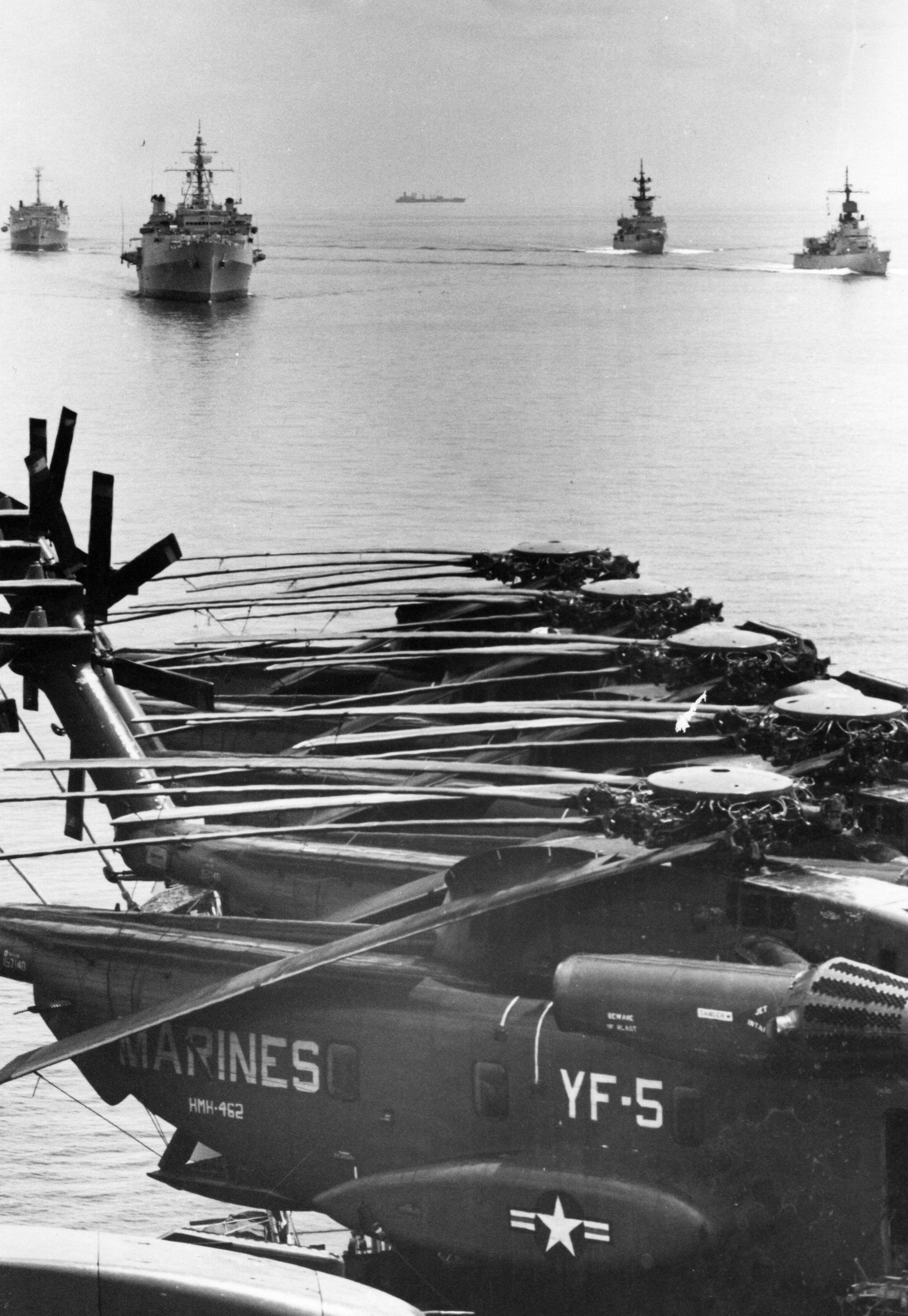
HMH-462 helicopters and Operation Eagle Pull evacuation fleet

On 3 March 1975 Amphibious Ready Group Alpha (Task Group 76.4), and the 31st Marine Amphibious Unit (Task Group 79.4) embarked and arrived at the designated station off Kampong Som in the Gulf of Thailand, the force comprised:

Task Group 76.4 (Movement Transport Group Alpha)

- USS Okinawa carrying HMH-462 comprising 14 CH-53, 3 CH-46, 4 AH-1J, and 2 UH-1E helicopters
- USS Vancouver
- USS Thomaston

Escort ships for naval gunfire, escort, and area defense:

- USS Edson
- USS Henry B. Wilson
- USS Knox
- USS Kirk
- USS Cook

On 17 March the Joint Chiefs of Staff, concerned that one Marine helicopter squadron was insufficient for the evacuation, ordered that USS Hancock offload its air wing and proceed to Pearl Harbor. On 26 March Marine Heavy Lift Helicopter Squadron HMH-463 comprising 25 CH-53, CH-46, AH-1J and UH-1E helicopters embarked on USS Hancock and it proceeded to Subic Bay. After taking on more helicopters at Subic Bay, USS Hancock was temporarily assigned to Amphibious Ready Group Bravo, standing by off Vung Tau, South Vietnam, but on 11 April she joined Amphibious Ready Group Alpha in the Gulf of Thailand. The marine evacuation contingent comprised one battalion landing team, 2nd Battalion, 4th Marines (2/4).

As the Khmer Rouge had no air force and only limited anti-aircraft capability, no fleet air cover was necessary, but the evacuation was supported by USAF aircraft based in Thailand. It was suspected that the Khmer Rouge might possess SA-7 shoulder-launched surface to air missiles and so the evacuation helicopters were painted with infrared low-reflective paint and equipped with ALE-29 flare dispensers.

== Evacuation ==
On the afternoon of 11 April 1975, the 31st MAU received orders to execute Operation Eagle Pull. At 06:00 on 12 April, 12 CH-53s of HMH-462 launched from the deck of USS Okinawa and then at 10-minute intervals descended again to pick up their marines. Elements of Companies F and H, and the command group embarked from USS Okinawa while elements of Company G boarded their helicopters on USS Vancouver, giving a total ground security force of 360 Marines. As the helicopters completed loading they formed into groups of three orbiting the task force.

At 07:30 Ambassador Dean notified the acting Cambodian Chief of State, Prime Minister Long Boret and other Cambodian leaders including Prince Sisowath Sirik Matak, that the US personnel would officially leave the country within the next few hours and asked if any desired evacuation, in which case they should be at the embassy by 09:30. All declined except for Saukham Khoy, successor to Lon Nol as President of the Khmer Republic, who left without telling his fellow leaders. Prince Sirik Matak, a former prime minister and a driving force behind the formation of the Khmer Republic rejected the offer of evacuation and said to Ambassador Dean that "I have committed this mistake of believing in you, the Americans."

The ten-man command group proceeded to drive vehicles to LZ Hotel, purposely disabling them to block vehicle access from any part of the city, other than the road from the Embassy to the LZ. The command group then proceeded to make contact with "King Bird", an orbiting HC-130 plane of the 56th Aerospace Rescue and Recovery Squadron, that would control the flow of the helicopters. "King Bird" then cleared in two USAF HH-53 Super Jolly Green Giants, from the 40th Aerospace Rescue and Recovery Squadron, as scheduled, to insert an Air Force Combat Control Team (CCT) to ensure the safe, controlled landings and departures of Marine helicopters to/from the LZ. Small arms fire during this insertion caused minimal damage to the first aircraft, but the CCT was successfully inserted, and the HH-53s departed to aerial refuel in preparation for the final extraction.

At 07:43 the first group of helicopters crossed the Cambodian coastline and about one hour later, after traversing 160 kilometres (99 mi) of hostile territory, the initial wave set down on LZ Hotel and the Marines quickly established a defensive perimeter. Large crowds of Cambodians soon gathered, more out of curiosity rather than to interfere. Having established the perimeter defense, the marines began the process of moving the crowds back in order to keep the LZ clear and then began moving the evacuee groups to the waiting CH-53 helicopters. As LZ Hotel could only hold three CH-53s at any time, flights arriving after the initial build-up had to be held at Point Oscar, some 50 kilometres (31 mi) south of Phnom Penh until called in by "King Bird". The evacuation proceeded smoothly although the number of evacuees was substantially fewer than anticipated. The last estimate indicated there would be 590 evacuees, 146 US nationals and 444 Cambodians and third country nationals. HMH-462 evacuated 84 US nationals and 205 Cambodians and third country nationals.

At 09:45, the US Embassy closed. There would be no diplomatic relations between the US and Cambodia again until 11 November 1991. By 10:41 all the evacuees including Ambassador Dean and President Saukham Khoy had been lifted out by helicopters of HMH-462. Helicopters of HMH-463 operating from USS Hancock then began to land to extract the ground security force.

At approximately 10:50, 107 mm rocket fire began impacting in the vicinity of LZ Hotel. Less than 10 minutes later, the LZ also received 82 mm mortar fire. As soon as the Khmer Rouge fire commenced, the controllers in the zone notified the Air Force forward air controllers (FACs) flying overhead in 23d Tactical Air Support Squadron OV-10s. The FACs immediately made low passes over the east bank of the Mekong, but could not spot any fire coming from known enemy positions in that location. At 10:59, the last element of 2nd Battalion 4th Marines left the zone and the last marine helicopter landed on USS Okinawa at 12:15.

At 11:15, the two USAF HH-53 Super Jolly Green Giants returned as scheduled, and successfully extracted the Combat Control Team and the Eagle Pull command element. After the HH-53's had safely departed the city, "King Bird" cleared the last Air Force HH-53's to depart for Thailand. These three Jolly Green Giants had been flying a precautionary search and rescue orbit just north of Phnom Penh during the entire operation in case any of the participating aircraft ran into trouble. As the Jolly Greens turned for home, the lead aircraft was hit by a 12.7 millimetres (0.50 in) machine gun round in the tail rotor. Despite severe vibrations the helicopter made it safely back to Ubon Air Base in Thailand. At 14:50 an HMH-462 CH-53 launched from USS Okinawa to carry Ambassador Dean to U-Tapao Air Base in Thailand.

On 13 April, the evacuees were flown to U-Tapao Air Base in Thailand on HMH-462 helicopters and Amphibious Ready Group Alpha proceeded to the South China Sea to rendezvous with Task Force 76 as it stood by to implement Operation Frequent Wind, the evacuation of Saigon.

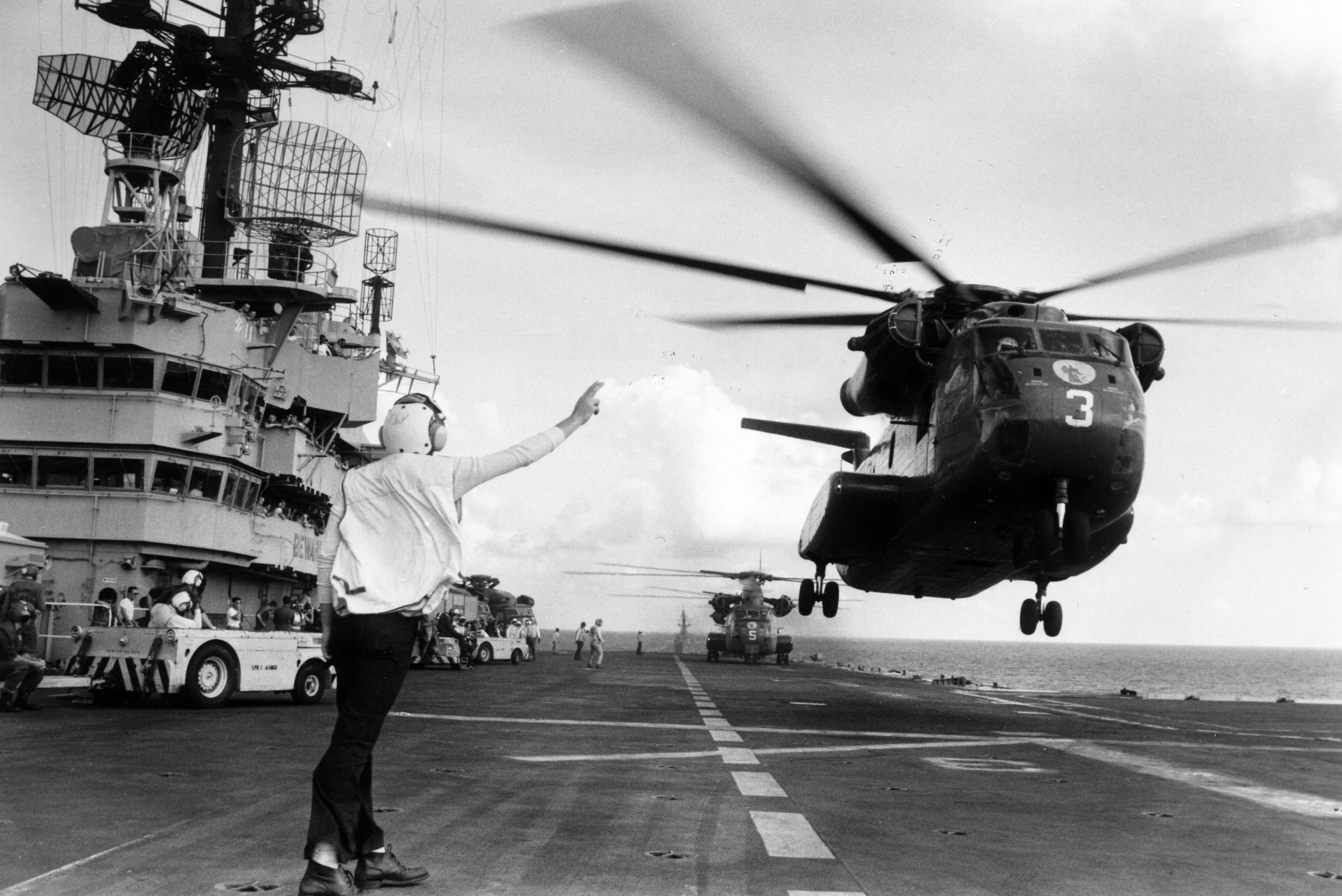
HMH-462 CH-53 takes off from USS Okinawa

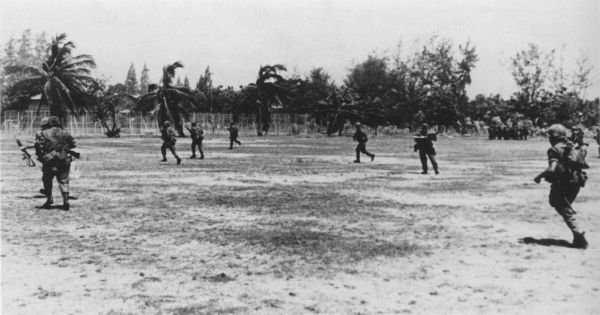
Marines move to perimeter of LZ Hotel

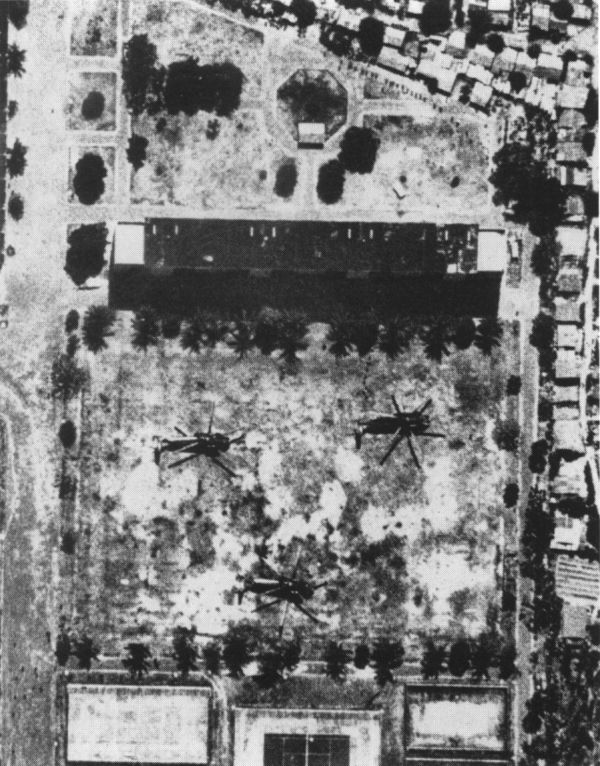
Aerial view of 3 USMC CH-53 helicopters on LZ Hotel

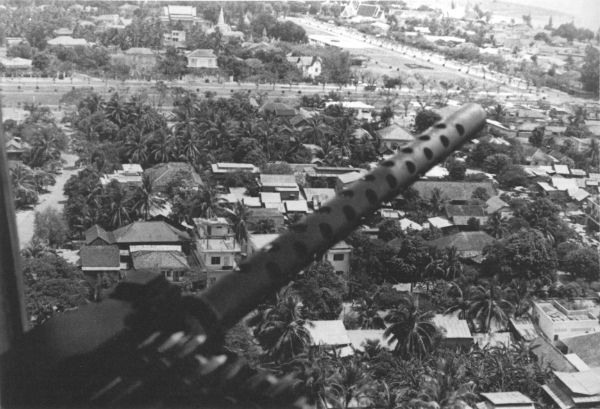
View of Phnom Penh from the window of a Marine CH-53 helicopter

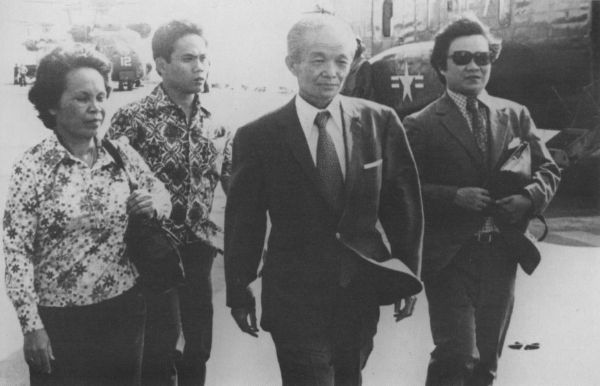
Saukam Khoy, President of the Khmer Republic arrives on USS Okinawa

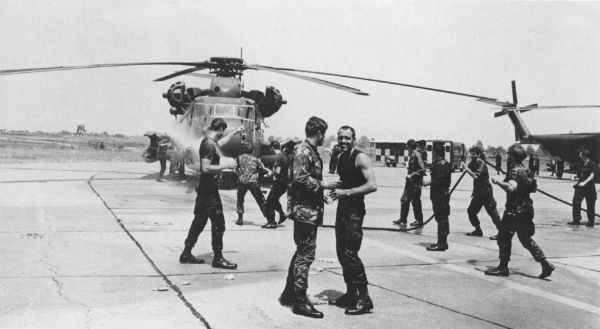
Eagle Pull command group and men of the 40th ARRS celebrate the successful completion of the operation

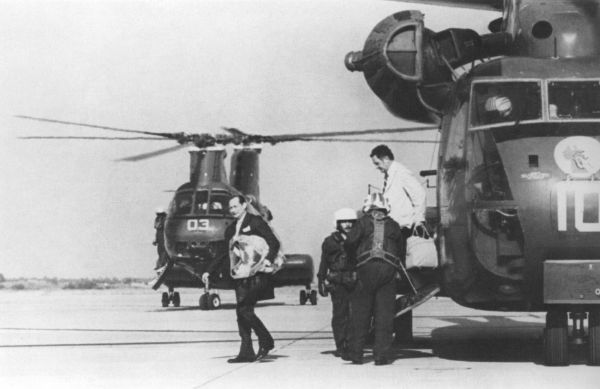
Ambassador Dean steps off an HMH-462 CH-53 at U-Tapao on the afternoon of 12 April

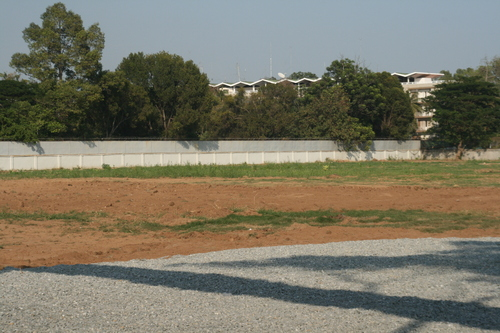
The Soccer Field/LZ Hotel as seen in January 2008

== Aftermath ==
Henry Kissinger observed in his Vietnam War memoir that the Ford Administration was astonished and shamed by the fact that top Cambodian officials refused to leave the country. These included Premier Long Boret and Lon Non, the Prime Minister's brother, both of whom were on the Khmer Rouge's advertised death list.

On 17 April 1975 the Khmer Rouge entered Phnom Penh bringing the Cambodian Civil War to an end. Long Boret, Lon Non and other top officials of the Khmer Republic Government were executed at the Cercle Sportif (ironically now the location of the US Embassy), while FANK troops in the city were disarmed, taken to the Olympic Stadium and executed.

For 2/4 Marines and Amphibious Ready Group Alpha, Operation Eagle Pull served as a small-scale dress rehearsal for the more complex Operation Frequent Wind during the Fall of Saigon, which occurred 17 days later.

== In popular culture ==
Operation Eagle Pull is depicted in the film The Killing Fields.
