= Mobile defense =

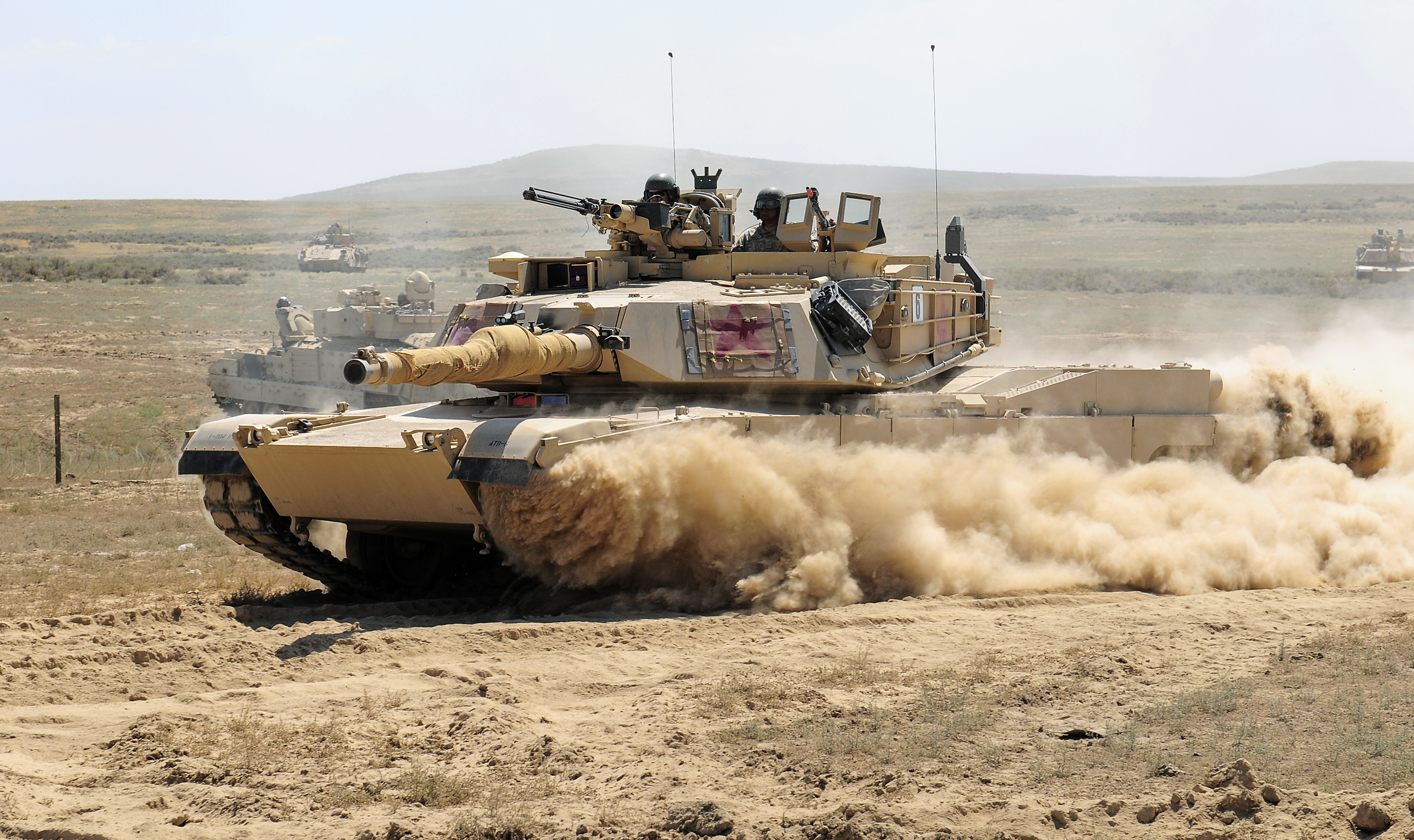
The strategy and tactics of mobile defense involves high mobility of available forces and means

Mobile defense is a manoeuvre by military units that repulses an attack by the use of well-planned counter-attacks by the defender, which seeks to avoid a pitched battle.

== History ==
One modern example of mobile defense was during World War II during the Third Battle of Kharkov. The German commander, Field Marshal Erich von Manstein, used II SS Panzer Corps to launch an attack to the rear of the Soviet spearhead force and to encircle it. The success led to the stabilization of the German Army Group South. Manstein became a proponent of the use of a strategy of mobile defense on the Eastern Front as a whole. Manstein came to the conclusion that Germany could not defeat the Soviet Union in the traditional static defensive system used in World War I and that the only chance to achieve a draw was to wear down the Soviet Army in costly mobile battles.

Manstein formulated a plan for the summer of 1943 in which he argued all mechanized forces should be deployed south of Kharkov and await the Soviet summer offensive, which was believed to be aimed at capturing the Donets Basin. The mechanized force would launch an offensive south to the Sea of Azov once the Basin had been captured by the Soviets. The German Führer, Adolf Hitler, ultimately rejected this plan, instead choosing a more conventional, double-envelopment attack on Kursk.

The Battle of St. Vith, one of the many battles fought during the Battle of the Bulge, was notable for its use of armor in a mobile defense. General Bruce Clarke organized his Combat command to prevent the German attackers from advancing more than 1 km a day. The delaying action was decisive in preventing German forces quickly advancing through the area and was one of the reasons for the German offensive's failure.

== Organizational features ==
Mobile defense is recommended for use when the terrain is favorable for deep maneuvers, the defending troops are not inferior to the enemy in mobility, there is at least partial air superiority, and the range of tasks assigned to the defenders allows temporary abandonment of some occupied territories. In addition, it is used when defending large water barriers, the sea coast, the hasty transition to defensive actions or when occupying the defense on a broad front.

When organizing mobile defense, a significant portion (up to two-thirds) of the available forces and means are assigned to the second echelon (reserve), which is withdrawn deep into their ranks. As a rule, the second echelon includes armored formations. The remaining forces (about one-third), the basis of which are motorized infantry units, are moved into the first echelon.

Blocking positions are prepared, engineering barriers are set up, and resistance centers are equipped in the areas where the attackers are supposed to be lured. They are usually engaged by first-echelon units with the task of firmly holding and suppressing any attempts by the enemy to advance in depth and to the flanks. As the enemy approaches their positions, the primary goal of first-echelon units is to offer maximum resistance and force the enemy to introduce additional forces and means to further advance. This forces the enemy to concentrate a dense grouping of forces in the area of the incursion, which becomes a profitable target for the use of weapons of mass destruction. The classic scenario for defeating an advancing group includes first massive strikes on it using artillery, aviation and nuclear weapons, and then a counterstrike by fresh second-echelon units supported by all available firepower.

Usually a division is considered the minimum unit capable of mounting a mobile defense, since it can provide forces and assets to simultaneously provide blocking, covering, and counterattacks. Nevertheless, in some cases it is possible to conduct mobile defense operations by a brigade or even a separate armored cavalry regiment.

== See also ==
- Area defense

== Bibliography ==
- Walters G. L. Mobile Defense: Extending the Doctrinal Continuum. — Fort Leavenworth, Kansas: School of Advanced Military Studies, 1993. — 48 p.
- Rogozin, Dmitry Мобильная оборона. Словарь-справочник «Война и мир в терминах и определениях». Information site voina-i-mir.ru.
