= USS Henry B. Wilson =

Charles F. Adams-class destroyer

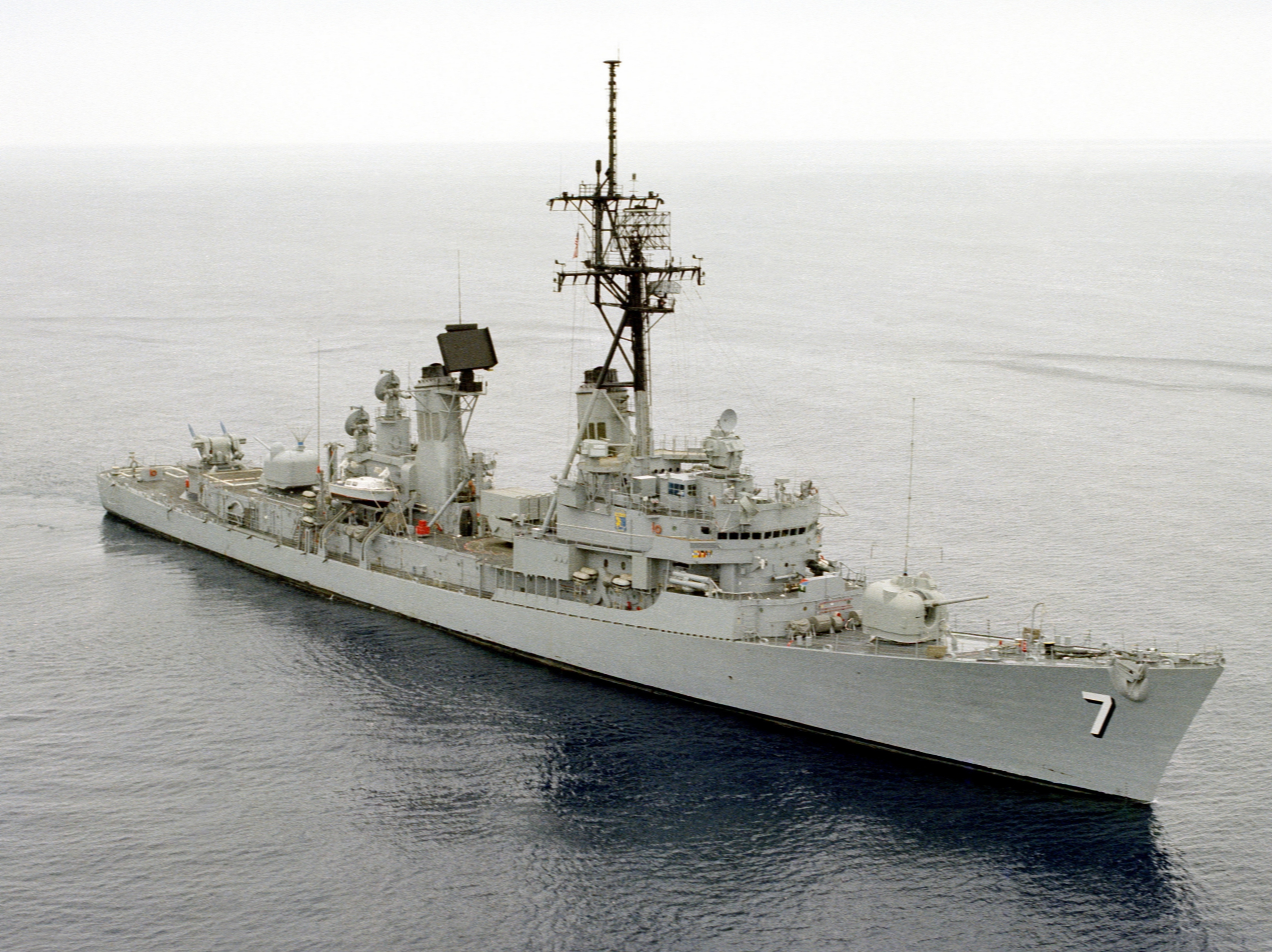
- USS Henry B. Wilson underway in 1983

History

United States
- Name: Henry B. Wilson
- Namesake: Henry Braid Wilson
- Ordered: 28 March 1957
- Builder: Defoe Shipbuilding Company
- Laid down: 28 February 1958
- Launched: 22 April 1959
- Sponsored by: Mrs. Patrick J. Hurley
- Acquired: 14 December 1960
- Commissioned: 17 December 1960
- Decommissioned: 2 October 1989
- Reclassified: DDG-7, 23 April 1957
- Stricken: 26 January 1990
- Identification: Callsign: NFZT; Hull number: DD-957
- Motto: Non Verbis Sed Re; (Deeds not Words)
- Honours and awards: See Awards
- Fate: Sunk as target, 15 August 2003

General characteristics
- Class & type: Charles F. Adams-class destroyer
- Displacement: 3,277 tons standard, 4,526 full load
- Length: 437 ft (133 m)
- Beam: 47 ft (14 m)
- Draft: 15 ft (4.6 m)
- Propulsion: 2 × General Electric steam turbines providing 70,000 shp (52 MW); 2 shafts; 4 × Babcock & Wilcox 1,275 psi (8,790 kPa) boilers
- Speed: 33 knots (61 km/h; 38 mph)
- Range: 4,500 nautical miles (8,300 km) at 20 knots (37 km/h)
- Complement: 354 (24 officers, 330 enlisted)
- Sensors & processing systems: AN/SPS-39 3D air search radar; AN/SPS-10 surface search radar; AN/SPG-51 missile fire control radar; AN/SPG-53 gunfire control radar; AN/SQS-23 Sonar and the hull mounted SQQ-23 Pair Sonar for DDG-2 through 19; AN/SPS-40 Air Search Radar
- Armament: 1 Mk 11 missile launcher (DDG2-14) or Mk 13 single arm missile launcher (DDG-15-24) for RIM-24 Tartar SAM system, or later the RIM-66 Standard (SM-1) and Harpoon antiship missile; 2 × 5"/54 caliber Mark 42 (127 mm) gun; 1 × RUR-5 ASROC Launcher; 6 × 12.8 in (324 mm) ASW Torpedo Tubes (2 x Mark 32 Surface Vessel Torpedo Tubes)

USS Henry B. Wilson (DDG-7), named for Admiral Henry Braid Wilson, was a Charles F. Adams-class guided missile armed destroyer laid down by Defoe Shipbuilding Company in Bay City, Michigan on 28 February 1958, launched on 22 April 1959 sponsored by Mrs. Patrick J. Hurley, daughter of Admiral Wilson, and commissioned on 17 December 1960.

== History ==
One of a new class of destroyers built from the keel up to fire guided missiles, Henry B. Wilson was the first ship of her size to be side-launched and when launched was the largest warship ever constructed on the Great Lakes. Because of these unique circumstances, she was christened not with the traditional champagne but with a bottle filled with water from the Great Lakes, the Saint Lawrence River, and the Atlantic Ocean. Following shakedown in the Caribbean she arrived in early May 1961 at her new home port, Naval Base San Diego. During the months that followed Henry B. Wilson conducted tests and drills of her missile systems, fleet exercises, and type training.

The guided missile destroyer sailed 6 January 1962 for duty in the Western Pacific, the first ship in that region to be armed with Tartar missiles. Stopping at Pearl Harbor and Yokosuka, she carried out antisubmarine exercises until returning to the United States 19 July 1962.

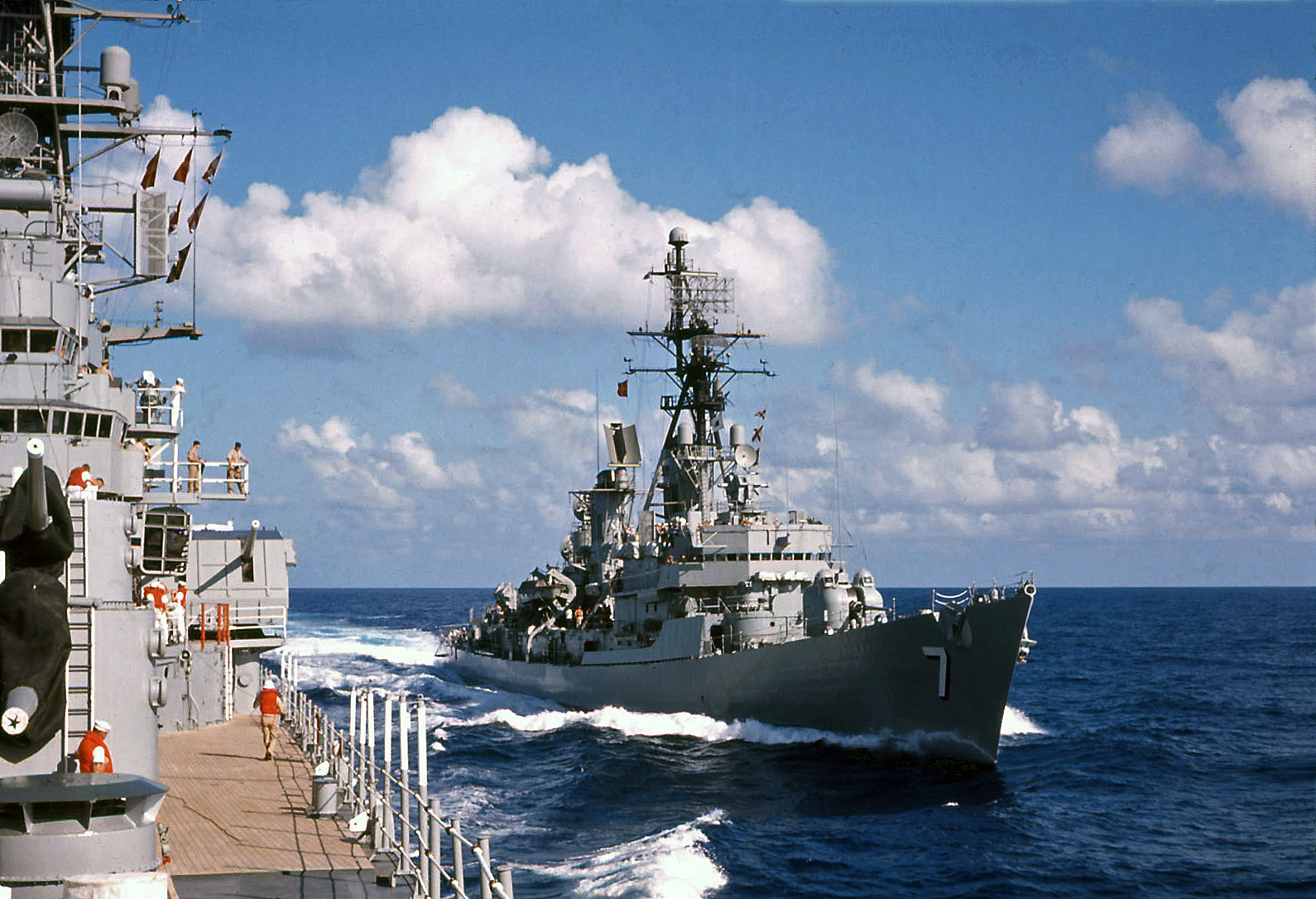
Henry B. Wilson underway in December 1963

Training off the California coast, punctuated with several missile firings, occupied Henry B. Wilson until 17 October 1963, when she sailed with carrier USS Kitty Hawk for duty with 7th Fleet in the Western Pacific. During the next 5 months she operated as part of America's mobile peacekeeping fleet between Japan and the Philippines. After returning to San Diego 16 April 1964, she resumed ASW and fire support operations.

Henry B. Wilson sailed on her third deployment to the Far East 4 June 1965. Arriving Subic Bay, Luzon, 21 June, she became flagship for Destroyer Squadron 21, then began rescue and air defense picket duty in the Gulf of Tonkin 31 July, along with shore bombardment support. As escort for USS Midway (CV-41), she departed Subic Bay 7 November and arrived San Diego the 24th.

After a year's operation off the West Coast, Henry B. Wilson departed San Diego for the Far East 5 November 1966. She resume picket duty off Vietnam 23 December. During the first 3 months of 1967 she cruised the South China Sea and Gulf of Tonkin, performing search and rescue missions and pounding enemy coastal positions in support of ground operations. She returned to San Diego early in May.

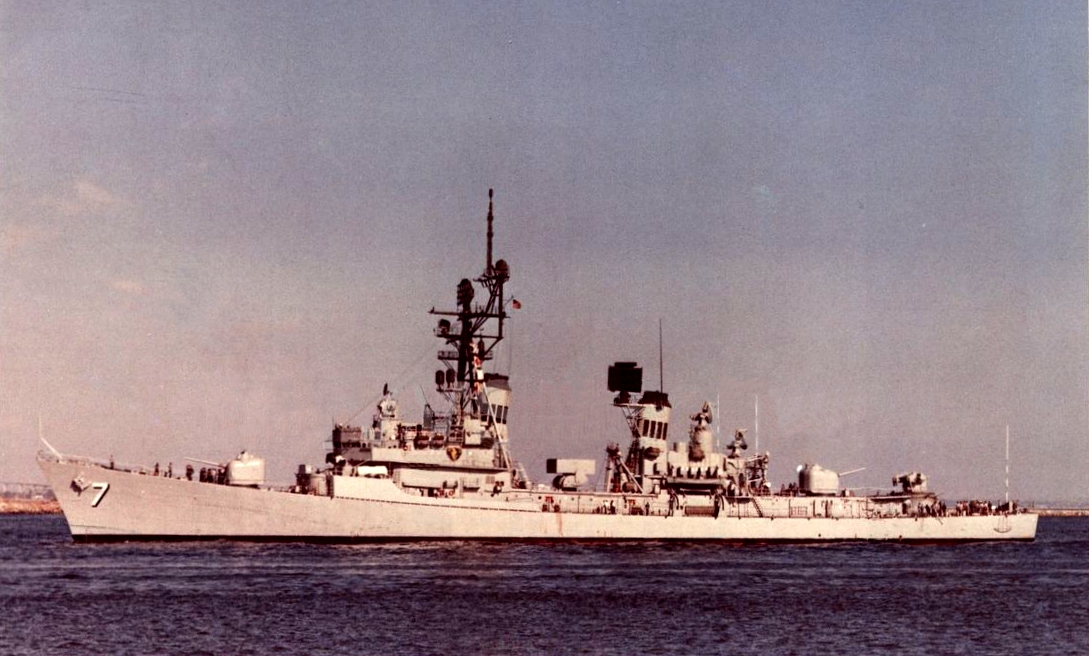
Henry B. Wilson underway in 1975

Henry B. Wilson served as plane guard for carriers on Yankee Station in the Tonkin Gulf, participated in Sea Dragon operations, patrolled on search and rescue duties and carried out naval gunfire support missions during the Vietnam War. In April 1975, she participated in Operation Eagle Pull (the evacuation of Phnom Penh, Cambodia, during its capture by the Khmer Rouge) and in May 1975 she participated in Operation Frequent Wind (the evacuation of South Vietnam during its capture by the People's Army of Vietnam and the Viet Cong) where part of her duties was to protect the ships loading evacuees by drawing fire from the shore batteries. During the same month she was one of the primaries in the operation to recapture the hijacked merchant ship SS Mayaguez in Cambodian waters.

On 10 August 1976 Henry B. Wilson departed home port for a Western Pacific deployment, returning home 21 March 1977. On 8 August 1979 she departed for another Westpac cruise and returned home on 14 February 1980. On 27 February 1981 Henry B. Wilson departed for another Westpac, returning on 21 September 1981. On 16 Mar 1984 Henry B. Wilson departed for a Westpac deployment and returned home 2 October 1984. On 15 September 1986 she departed for a Westpac and Indian Ocean deployment, returning home 14 March 1987. On 2 December 1988 Henry B. Wilson departed on her final deployment going to the Western Pacific and Indian Ocean. She returned 1 June 1989.

=== Fate ===
Henry B. Wilson was decommissioned on 2 October 1989, stricken from the Naval Vessel Register on 26 January 1990 and sold for scrap on 15 April 1994. The scrap contract was terminated on 23 March 1999 and the ship was resold on 6 April 2002. She was re-acquired and sunk as a target ship 15 August 2003.

== Awards ==
According to the Navy Unit awards site, Henry B. Wilson received a number of awards in her history.

- Combat Action Ribbon for 16 May 1968, 3 June 1968, 3 November 1972 and 9–10 November 1972
- Navy Unit Commendation for 16 July 1972 to 21 January 1973
- Meritorious Unit Commendation for 16 February 1967 to 3 March 1967
- Meritorious Unit Commendation for 27 February 1968 to 8 July 1968
- Meritorious Unit Commendation for 4 November 1969 to 3 April 1970
- Meritorious Unit Commendation 12 April 1975, Operation Eagle Pull
- Meritorious Unit Commendation 20 April 1975 to 2 May 1975, Operation Frequent Wind
- Navy E Ribbon for 1 July 1974 to 1 April 1976 and 1 January 1985 to 30 June 1986
- Armed Forces Expeditionary Medal for 10 January 1970 to 13 January 1970.
- Armed Forces Expeditionary Medal for 23 July 1971 to 11 September 1971
- Armed Forces Expeditionary Medal for 11 April 1975 to 13 April 1975, Operation Eagle Pull
- Armed Forces Expeditionary Medal for 29 April 1975 to 30 April 1975, Operation Frequent Wind
- Armed Forces Expeditionary Medal for 15 May 1975, Mayaquez Operation
- Vietnam Service Medal for several periods in 1965 and 1967 to 1973.
- Humanitarian Service Medal for 12 April 1975, Operation Eagle Pull
- Humanitarian Service Medal, for 29 April 1975 to 30 April 1975, Operation Frequent Wind
- Republic of Vietnam Meritorious Unit Citation (Gallantry Cross Medal Color with Palm) for several periods in 1968
