= USS Tourmaline =

Patrol vessel of the United States Navy

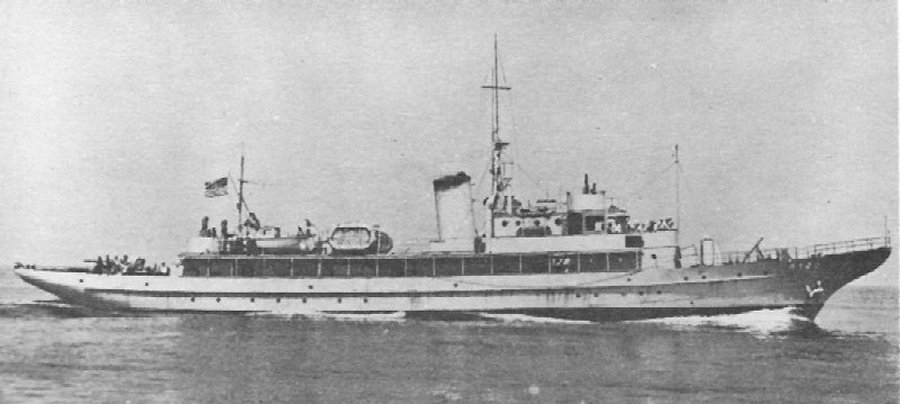
- USS Tourmaline (PY-20)

History

United States
- Name: Sylvia
- Builder: Bath Iron Works, Bath, Maine
- Laid down: 9 January 1930
- Launched: 24 May 1930
- Acquired: 2 July 1930
- Fate: Acquired by the Navy 16 May 1941

History

United States
- Name: Tourmaline
- Namesake: Tourmaline
- Acquired: 16 May 1941
- Commissioned: 7 June 1941
- Decommissioned: 18 July 1945
- Refit: Entered Marine Basin Company Yard, Brooklyn, NY, 23 June 1941
- Stricken: 13 August 1945
- Identification: Hull symbol:PY-20; Code letters:NASY
- Fate: Sold 23 January 1946 to Andrew M. Embiricos and Manuel E. Kulukndis of the Greek War Relief Association of New York

History

Greece
- Name: Adelphic
- Owner: Andrew M. Embiricos and Manuel E. Kulukndis
- Acquired: 23 January 1946 Sold in 1948 to the Hellinic Maritime Enterprise Co., Ltd. "Saronikos" of Piraeus, Greece

History

Greece
- Name: Kyknos
- Owner: Hellinic Maritime Enterprise Co., Ltd.
- Acquired: 1948 Laid up at Volos, Greece, between 1974/1979
- Fate: Scrapped in 1979

General characteristics
- Type: Patrol yacht
- Displacement: 750 long tons (762 t); 539 long tons (548 t) (1960)
- Length: 154 ft (47 m)
- Beam: 26 ft 6 in (8.08 m)
- Draft: 10 ft 6 in (3.20 m)
- Installed power: 2 × Cooper Bessemer 8-JRDR diesel engines; 1,700 bhp (1,300 kW)
- Propulsion: 2 × screws
- Speed: 13 knots (24 km/h; 15 mph)
- Complement: 161
- Armament: 1 × 3 in (76 mm)/50 caliber gun; 2 × depth charge tracks; 4 × .50-caliber (12.7-millimeter) M2 Browning machine guns

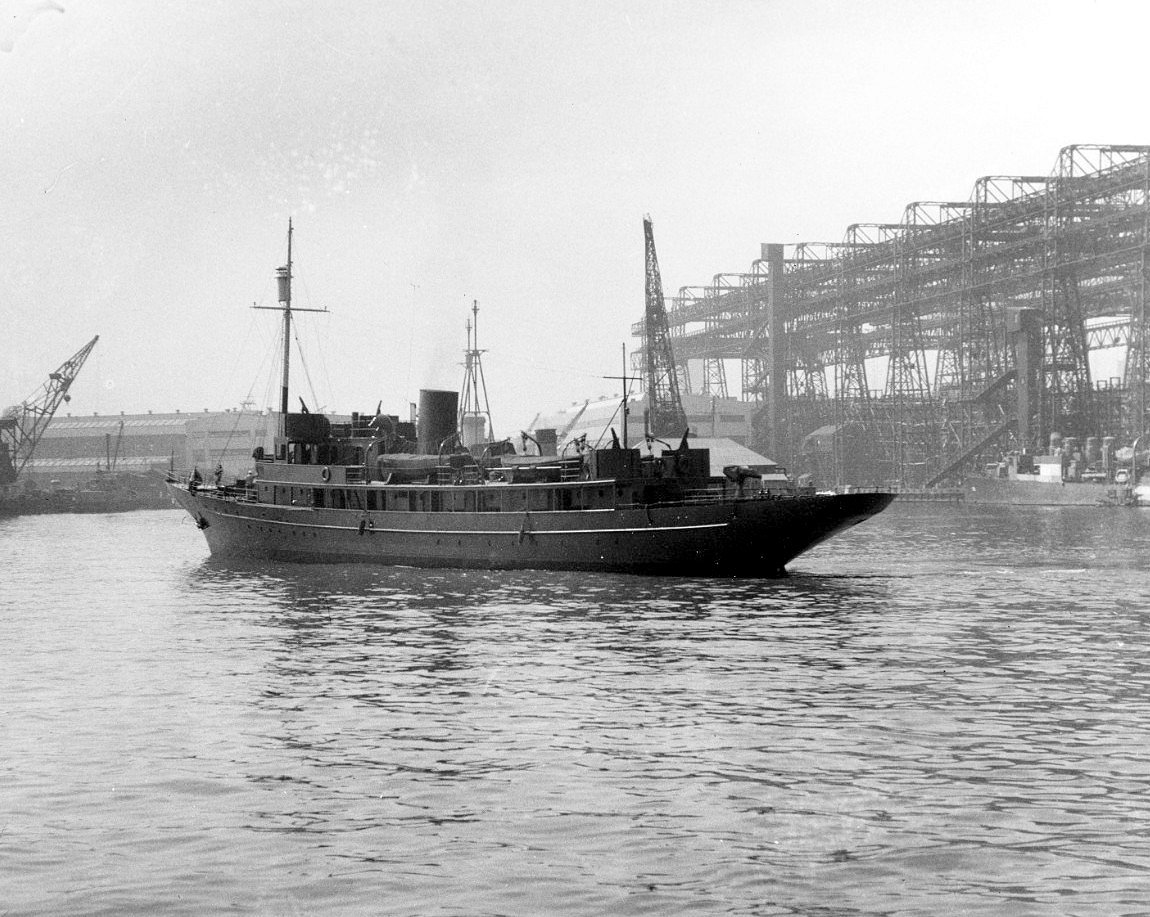
USS Tourmaline in NY naval yard during outfitting

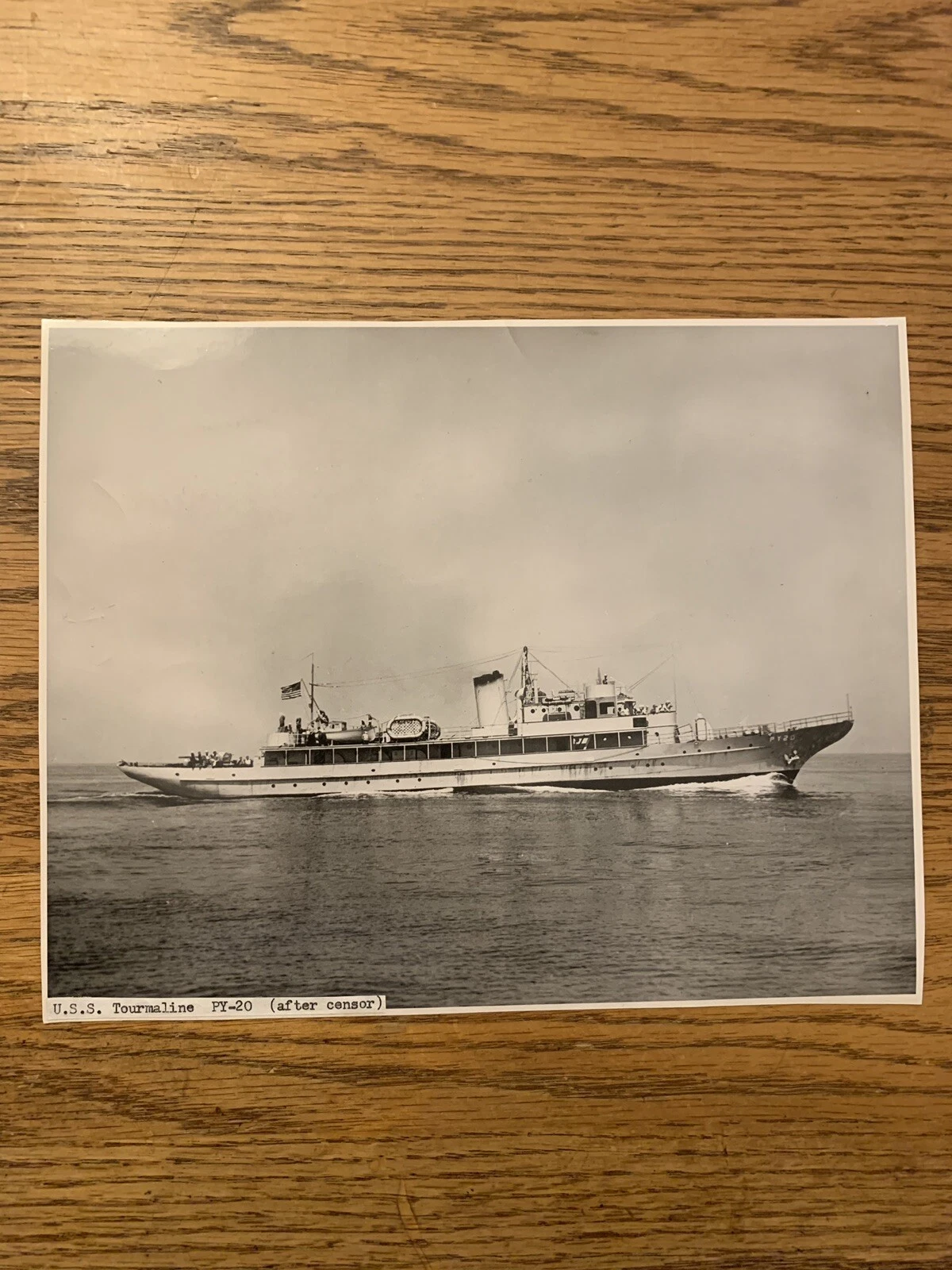
official photos of USS Tourmaline during sea trails

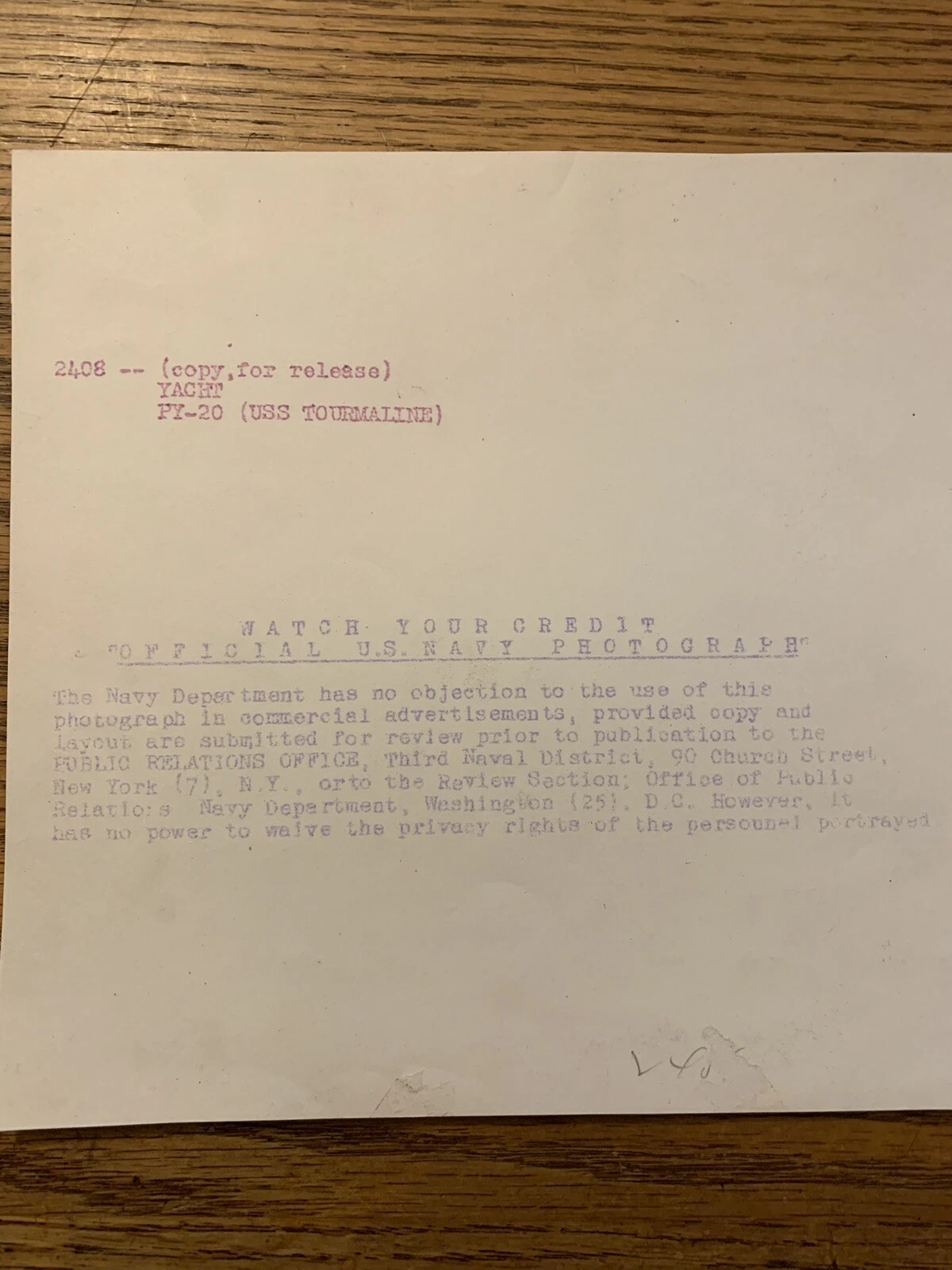
official photos of USS Tourmaline during sea trails, rear

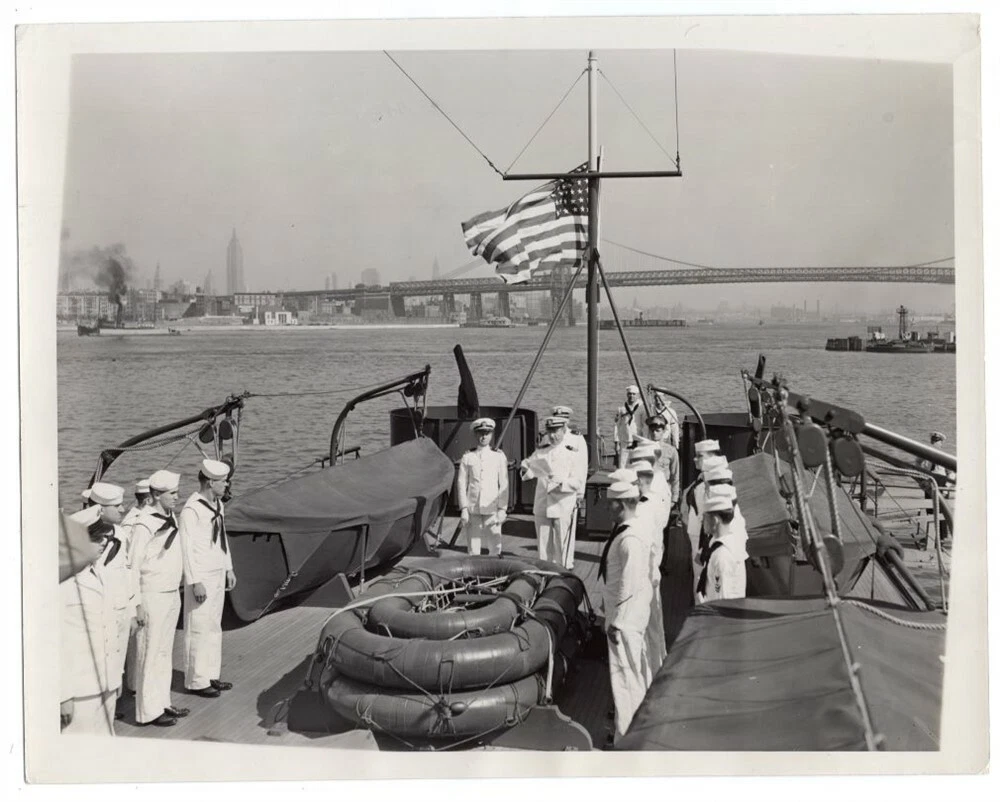
official photo of USS Tourmaline during commission

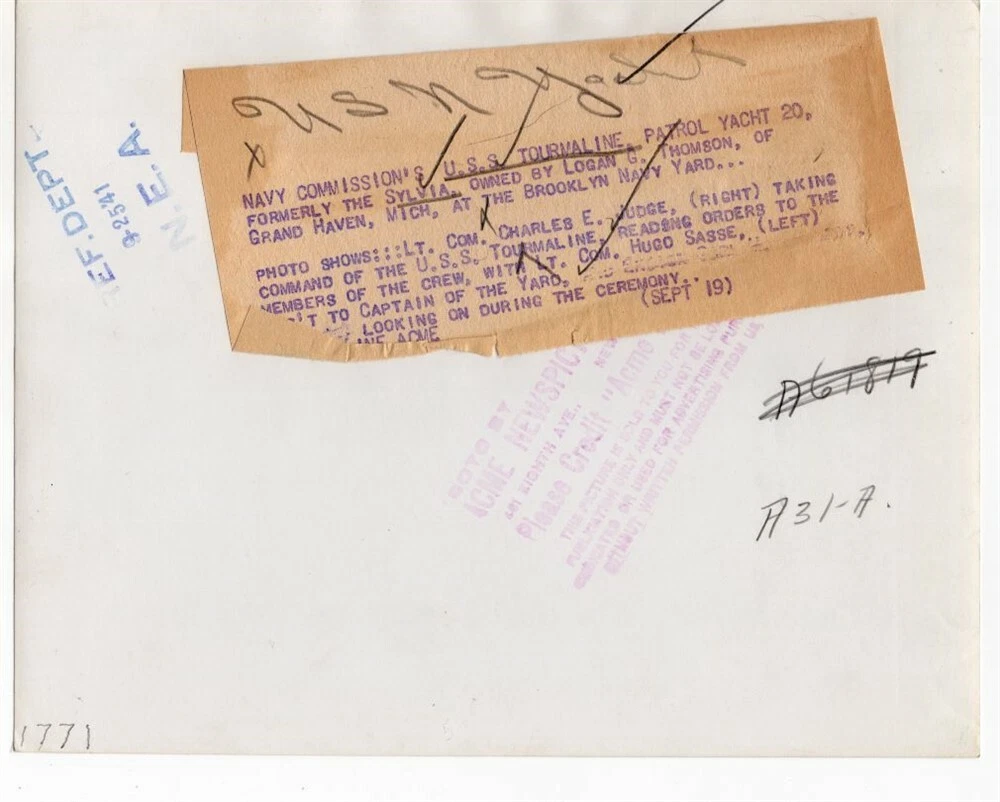
official photo of USS Tourmaline during commission

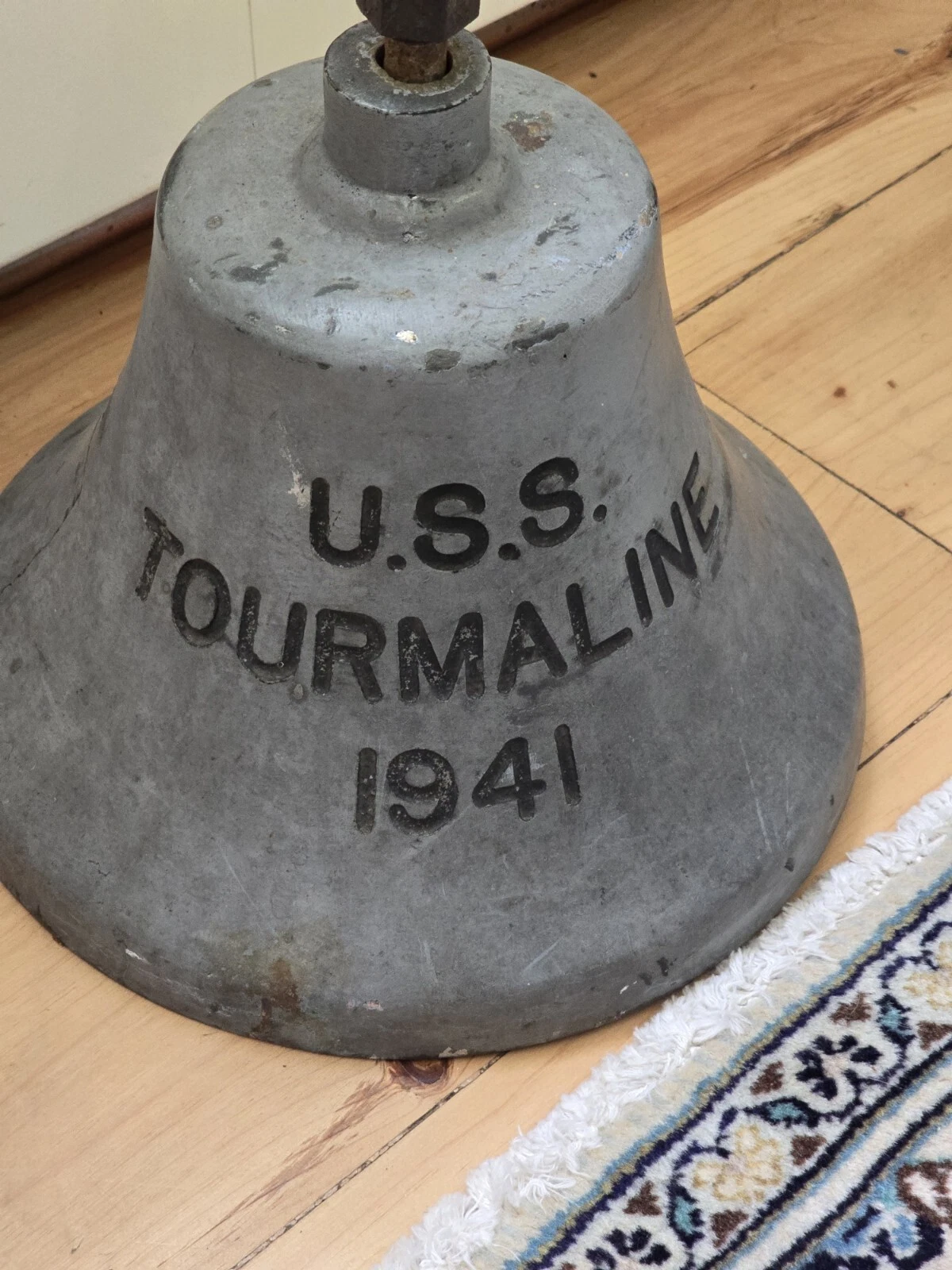
salvaged ship's bell, owned by Adorn Jeweler's Fine Antiques

USS Tourmaline (PY-20) was a converted yacht that patrolled with the United States Navy in World War II.

== Construction, acquisition, and commissioning ==
Tourmaline (PY-20)—a yacht built in 1930 at Bath, Maine, by the Bath Iron Works as Sylvia—was purchased by the Navy on 16 May 1941 from Logan G. Thomson of Grand Haven, Michigan. She entered the Marine Basin Co., Brooklyn, New York, on 23 June, for conversion before proceeding to the New York Navy Yard where she was commissioned as Tourmaline on 19 September 1941.

== Service history ==
The converted yacht departed New York harbor on 2 October and arrived at Norfolk, Virginia, two days later. She operated out of Hampton Roads during the two remaining months that the United States remained technically at peace. After Japan's attack on Pearl Harbor, she conducted her initial war patrols off the United States East Coast based at Norfolk and at Charleston, South Carolina.

The early part of the year 1942 found Tourmaline operating between Norfolk and Key West, Florida. She was patrolling off the Chesapeake Bay early on 15 April 1942 when the U.S. Navy submarine USS Mackerel (SS-204) contacted her to report that she had sighted a German U-boat near the entrance to the bay and fired a torpedo at it, after which the U-boat had outdistanced her, apparently unscathed. After joining Mackerel, Tourmaline searched for the U-boat, but found no sign of it.

On 29 June 1942, Tourmaline departed Key West to escort a convoy of merchant ships to Norfolk. En route back toward Charleston, she assisted the destroyer Landsdowne in pursuing an underwater contact, but neither ship managed to locate the suspected U-boat. The yacht arrived at Charleston on 5 July. Her next mission called for her to escort a convoy to the British West Indies. She reached Trinidad with her charges on 26 July and patrolled in that vicinity through early August before sailing for Key West on the 12th of that month.

After cruises on patrols in Florida waters, she departed Key West on 27 October—in company with SC-499, SC-641, and SC-675—to escort five merchantmen to Havana, Cuba. Tourmaline next headed for New York, where she arrived on 7 November. She returned to Guantanamo Bay, Cuba, on the 19th, establishing a pattern which lasted through much of her subsequent service in which she escorted convoys between New York and ports in the Caribbean. On 13 December 1942, five days out of New York, Tourmaline's underwater sound gear picked up a strong metallic echo. She speeded to attack and dropped three depth charges before her steering gear was damaged. Forced to steer with her engines, the escort broke off the chase, and her quarry escaped.

After the damage was repaired, Tourmaline resumed escort duty and continued convoy work until 25 January 1944. On that day, the yacht received orders to report to the 1st Naval District, where she joined the Naval Local Defense Force based at Boston, Massachusetts. For the remainder of 1944 and into June 1945, Tourmaline patrolled the waters off the Massachusetts coast through the end of the war in the Atlantic.

== Decommissioning and disposal ==
Decommissioned on 18 July 1945, Tourmaline was temporarily laid-up at the Mystic Shipbuilding Company and Repair Yard, East Boston, Mass. Struck from the Navy list on 13 August 1945, she was transferred to the War Shipping Board, Maritime Commission, on 3 January 1946. On 23 January 1946, Andrew M. Embiricos and Manuel E. Kulukundis, of the Greek War Relief Association, Inc., purchased the yacht under its original name, Sylvia.
