= USS Marlin (SS-205) =

Submarine of the United States

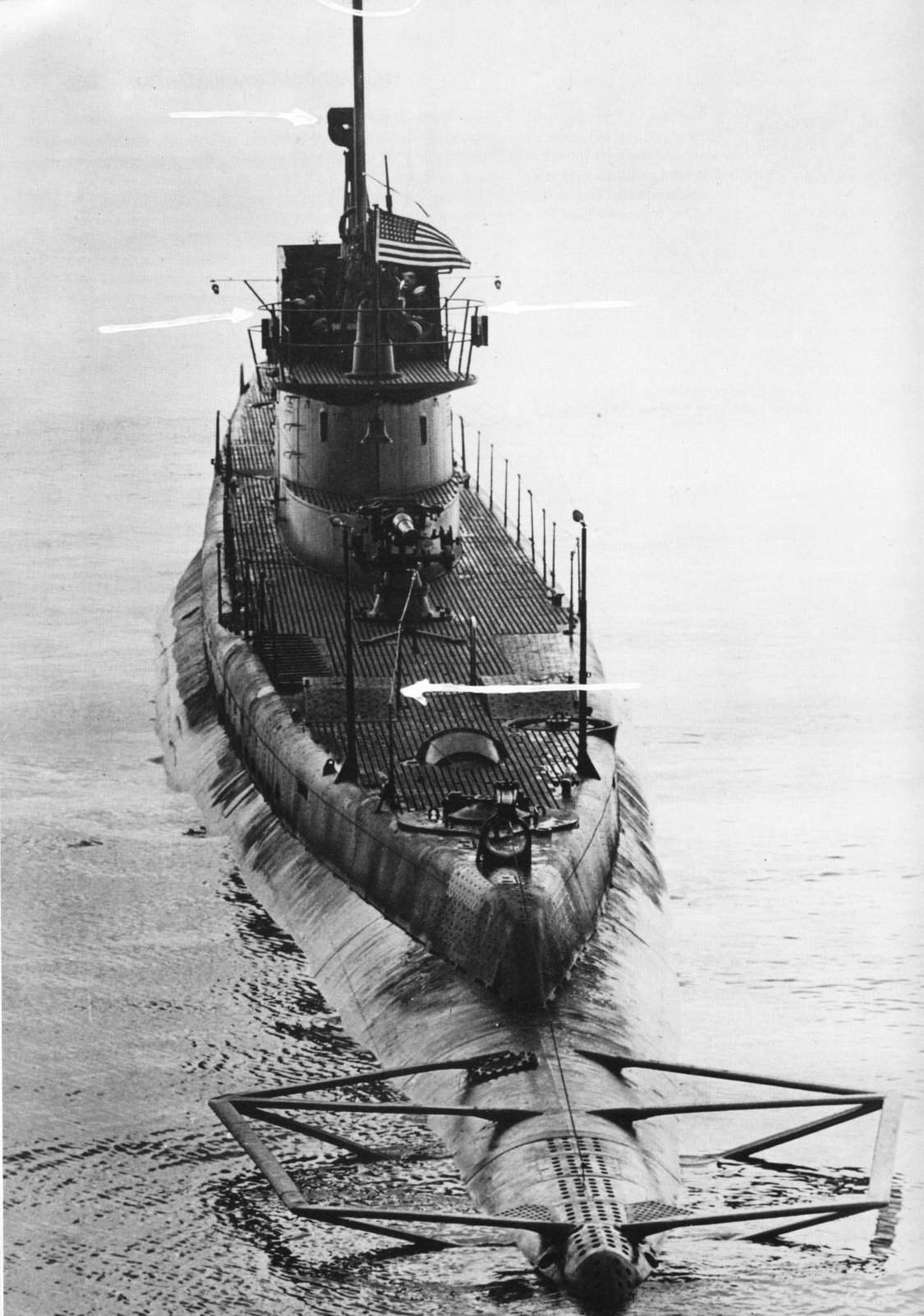
- USS Marlin (SS-205) off Portsmouth, New Hampshire, on 19 May 1943.

History

United States
- Builder: Portsmouth Naval Shipyard, Kittery, Maine
- Laid down: 23 May 1940
- Launched: 29 January 1941
- Commissioned: 1 August 1941
- Decommissioned: 9 November 1945
- Stricken: 28 November 1945
- Fate: Sold for scrap, 29 March 1946

General characteristics
- Class & type: Mackerel-class submarine
- Displacement: 800 long tons (810 t) standard, surfaced; 1,165 long tons (1,184 t) submerged
- Length: 238 ft 11 in (72.82 m)
- Beam: 21 ft 7 1/4 in (6.585 m)
- Draft: 13 ft ¼ in (4.0 m)
- Propulsion: 2 × ALCO diesel engines driving electrical generators; 2 × 60-cell Sargo batteries; 2 × General Electric electric motors; 2 shafts; 1,700 bhp (1,300 kW) surfaced; 1,500 bhp (1,100 kW) submerged
- Speed: 14.5 kn (27 km/h) surfaced; 9 kn (17 km/h) submerged
- Range: 7,400 nmi (13,700 km); at 10 kn (19 km/h)
- Test depth: 250 ft (76 m)
- Complement: 4 officers, 34 enlisted
- Armament: 6 × 21 in (533 mm) torpedo tubes; (four forward, two aft); 12 torpedoes; 1 × 3 inch (76 mm)/50 caliber deck gun

USS Marlin (SS-205), a Mackerel-class submarine, was the first ship of the United States Navy to be named for the marlin, a large game fish. Marlin and her near-sister Mackerel (designed and built by the Electric Boat Company) were prototype small submarines, which the Navy was exploring to replace the aging S-class submarines. References differ as to whether Marlin had a direct drive propulsion system or diesel-electric drive.

Her keel was laid down by Portsmouth Navy Yard in Kittery, Maine, on 23 May 1940. She was launched on 29 January 1941 sponsored by Mrs. John D. Wainwright, and commissioned on 1 August 1941.

After service in the Atlantic Fleet out of Submarine Base New London, Connecticut, for half a year, Marlin departed New London 21 March 1942 for Casco Bay, Maine. She arrived the next day for duty with TG 27.1, training new escort vessels in antisubmarine warfare. She returned to New London 18 April, and operated in Long Island Sound through 1942.

On 7 January 1943 the submarine arrived in Casco Bay for further duty with TG 27.1 until 16 January. She then spent the next 2½ years patrolling and training ships off New London and Portsmouth, New Hampshire.

On 26 July 1945, while making a submerged practice approach on Chaffee (DE-230), she collided with SC-642 with slight damage to both ships. In September Marlin kept company with Chetco (AT-99) on one of her trips from Portsmouth, reaching New London 10 September.

On 20 October 1945 Marlin departed New London with Skipjack (SS-184) for Bridgeport, Connecticut, arriving that day. Five days later she continued on to Boston, Mass, arriving 31 October. She was decommissioned at the Boston Navy Yard on 9 November 1945. Marlin was sold 29 March 1946 to the Boston Metals Company of Baltimore, Maryland, for scrapping.

Marlin is the submarine prominently featured as the fictional Corsair in the 1943 movie Crash Dive, filmed at Submarine Base New London. Her sail at the time of the movie resembled Mackerel's; the forward portion was later cut back for a 20 mm Oerlikon gun platform.
