= Crash Dive =

1943 film by Otto Brower, Archie Mayo

- Theatrical release poster
- Directed by: Archie Mayo
- Screenplay by: Jo Swerling
- Story by: W.R. Burnett
- Produced by: Milton Sperling
- Starring: Tyrone Power; Anne Baxter; Dana Andrews
- Cinematography: Leon Shamroy
- Edited by: Ray Curtiss; Walter Thompson
- Music by: David Buttolph
- Color process: Technicolor
- Production company: 20th Century Fox
- Distributed by: 20th Century-Fox
- Release date: April 28, 1943 (New York City)
- Running time: 106 minutes
- Country: United States
- Language: English
- Box office: $2,646,000 (US rentals)

Crash Dive is a World War II war film in Technicolor released in 1943. It was directed by Archie Mayo, written by Jo Swerling (from a story by W.R. Burnett), and starred Tyrone Power, Dana Andrews, and Anne Baxter. The film was the last for Power before assignment to recruit training, as he had already enlisted in the United States Marine Corps.

== Plot ==
Lieutenant Ward Stewart, commanding a PT boat, sinks a U-boat, saving a lifeboat full of survivors. Upon his return to port, he is transferred to the submarine USS Corsair to make up a shortage of trained submarine officers. At the submarine base in New London, Connecticut, his first meeting with his new captain, Dewey Connors, is a tense, uneasy encounter, as Stewart's disappointment at being transferred is undisguised. Taking leave before Corsair sails, Connors plans to meet his girlfriend, a New London school teacher named Jean Hewlett. Hewlett's plans change when she has to chaperone students on a trip and Connors declines to accompany her. Stewart, meanwhile, encounters Hewlett on a train bound for Washington D.C. and they begin a romance. When Connors and Hewlett meet for dinner, she suggests marriage. He has delayed marrying her until his promotion to commander comes through, which would allow him to support her financially.

Back aboard Corsair, Stewart's infatuation with PT boats irritates Connors, but the two become friends after they engage a Nazi Q-ship. When Connors is wounded, Stewart takes command and sinks the ship. After their return to base, Stewart continues to woo Hewlett and charms her into joining him for dinner at a restaurant which is also his uncle's home. Tension re-emerges after Stewart discovers the newly-promoted Connors is also in love with Jean and about to propose. The men put their animosity aside when they embark on a mission to locate and destroy the secret island base that had supplied the sunken Q-ship.

When a German coastal tanker is sighted near the base, Connors orders Corsair to follow it through the harbor's anti-submarine net. They put ashore a landing party of eight commanded by Stewart to destroy as many German munitions as possible while Corsair sinks every ship it can in the harbor. Among the members of Stewart's landing party are Chief Mac MacDonnell and Messman Oliver Jones. The Chief has concealed a heart condition from the Navy and Jones has quietly assisted him. Both know the Chief's ruse will be exposed at his next physical. And though the raid is a great success, Chief MacDonnell makes the ultimate sacrifice while covering the escape of Stewart and Jones from a squad of German riflemen. As soon as the two complete their swim to the boat, Connors submerges the boat and puts to sea, despite being wounded by enemy fire. Connors and Stewart make peace and Stewart and Jean are married in New London.

The movie ends with Tyrone Power providing a voice-over that explains how the various types of Navy ships work together as a team to defeat the enemy.

== Cast ==
As appearing in screen credits (main roles identified):

Actor	Role
Tyrone Power	Lt. Ward Stewart
Anne Baxter	Jean Hewlett
Dana Andrews	Lt. Cdr. Dewey Connors
James Gleason	Chief Mike "Mac" McDonnell
Dame May Whitty	Grandmother
Harry Morgan	Lt. J.G. "Brownie" Brown
Ben Carter	Oliver Cromwell Jones

== Background ==
Part of the film was shot at Naval Submarine Base New London, Connecticut. A few naval combatants rarely seen in Technicolor are visible in the early part of the film. The PT boats seen near the beginning are the 77-foot Elco type. The submarine primarily featured as Corsair was the experimental USS Marlin, with a conning tower modified to resemble her sister USS Mackerel. A few O-class and R-class submarines, built in World War I and used for training in World War II, are visible in the background of some shots. For wartime security reasons, no submarine classes used in combat in World War II appear in the film. USS Semmes is seen in one shot; there are probably not many good Technicolor views of a four-stack destroyer available today. Semmes was being used as a sonar testbed at the time.

One of the scenes in the film was similar to that in Destination Tokyo (1943) starring Cary Grant, where the submarines follow an enemy tanker into their naval base through a minefield. Another similar plot device was in the 1954 film Hell and High Water about an island base to be used to launch a Tupolev Tu-4, a copy of the Boeing B-29 Superfortress, in U.S. markings for an sneak atomic bomb attack.

One interesting feature of the film is the significant role of African-American actor Ben Carter as messman Oliver Cromwell Jones. While most World War II films (particularly those made during the war) feature few, if any, African-American characters, Crash Dive is a notable exception. Although Carter plays a stereotypical role as a low ranking sailor (at that time, Blacks could only serve as cooks and messmen), his character is more developed than most African-American characters of the time by being shown to be a confidant to a higher ranking crew member. Jones (Ben Carter) also participates in a commando raid late in the film.

It is possible portions of the film were inspired by the actions of the Greenland Patrol, a U.S. Coast Guard unit which patrolled the waters off Greenland, looking for Nazi weather stations and submarines. One such weather station was captured in June, 1941, which among other things impeded accurate German weather forecasting. Its personnel were taken to Boston and interned. The incident was classified at the time because the United States was not at war with Germany. But after Pearl Harbor, this information was released to the American public.

== Awards ==
Fred Sersen and Roger Heman Sr. won the Academy Award for Best Visual Effects at the 16th Academy Awards.
