= Area defense =

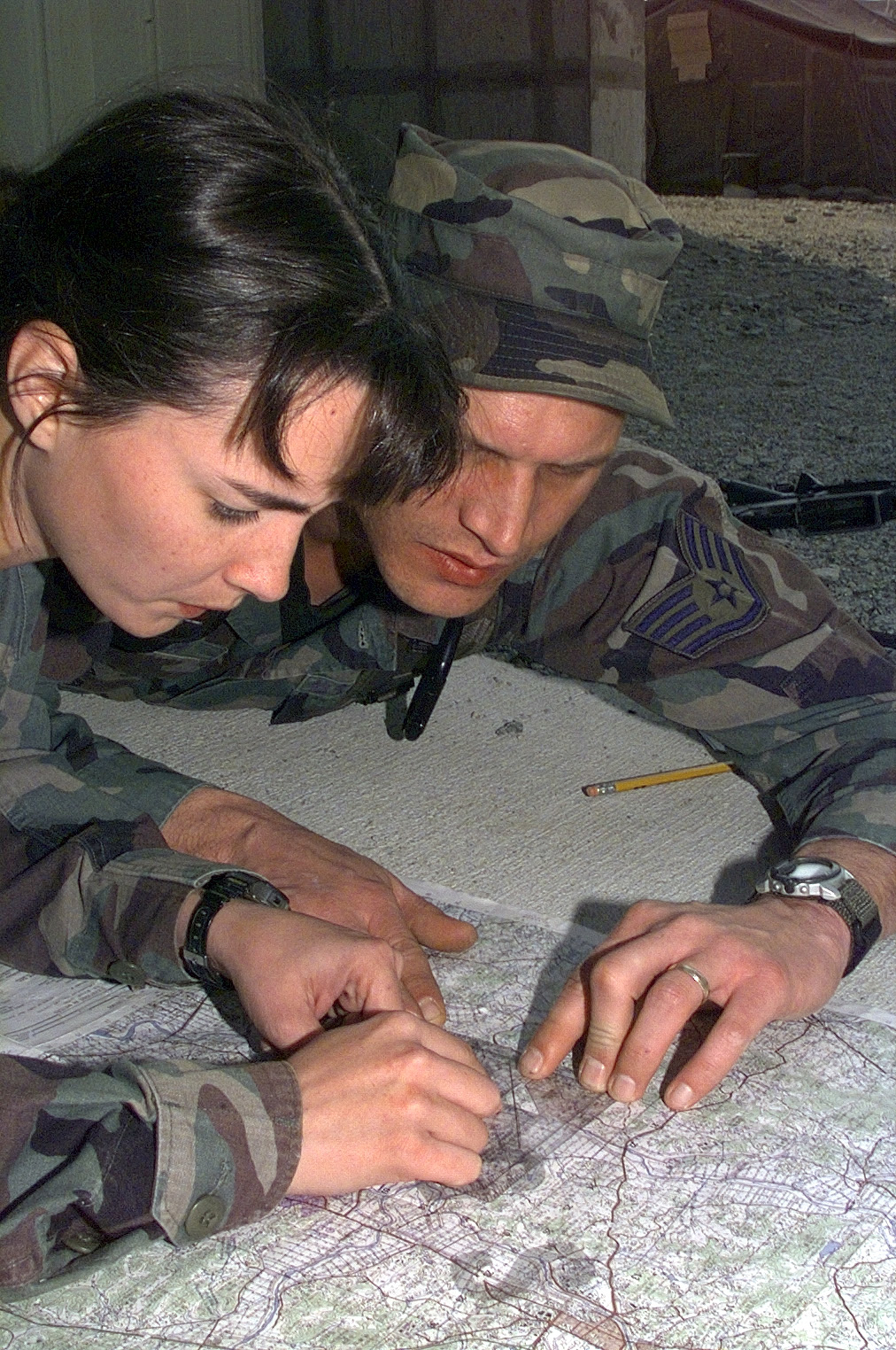
Area defense requires the defending party to have a good knowledge of the terrain and the ability to work with cartographic information

Area defense is a method of positional defensive warfare described in the U.S. Army's combat manuals of the 1960s and 1970s. After 1982 the term "positional defense" replaced it.

== Basic provisions ==
Area defense consisted of stubbornly holding tactically advantageous positions with careful equipping of defense lines, engineering barriers, and the fullest possible use of all available firepower of the troops. As a rule, area defense was used to cause the maximum damage to the enemy and to preserve the integrity of the defensive belt in conditions of inadequate depth of defense and in types of terrain which limited the maneuvering of forces. The use of units that were inferior in mobility to enemy troops was considered advisable for district defense, and district defense could also be used in combination with Mobile Defense techniques, especially at the operational level.

American military theorists consider this method of warfare a classic. When defending an area, an American mechanized division could operate in a band up to 19 miles (30 km) deep and 12–19 miles (20–30 km) wide at the front.

=== Organizational features ===
When beginning area defense, it was supposed to create a forward defense area and a reserve area in all links from brigade upwards. According to American experts, the backbone of the entire defensive system was the anti-tank defenses.

The forward defense area was intended to deploy first-line troops and was considered the main element of the whole defensive complex. Within it were erected defensive lines, firing positions of field artillery and air defense facilities, position areas of missile troops, command posts, systems of engineering barriers, etc. Units of the first echelon built their positions in the form of platoon and company strongpoints, which were prepared for a all around defense. If there were no direct contact between the defending forces and the enemy, a 15–25 km deep supply strip was created in front of the location of the forward defense area. On it there were positions for corps cover troops, division general and combat guard forces of the first echelon, and various obstacles and mine blast obstacles were arranged.

The Reserve area had to ensure their dispersed and concealed deployment, as well as the ability to move quickly to solve the whole range of tasks (counterattacks, etc.). Its engineering preparation consisted in setting up barriers, defensive lines, cut-off positions and deployment lines.

== Combat order and fire system ==
The troops were usually arranged in two echelons, the first of which was to have at least two-thirds of all forces and means, while the second, with the rest of the troops, was to act as a reserve.

Compounds and units of the first echelon were tasked with taking the enemy's onslaught, repelling it, and stopping the advance of enemy troops and holding the lines they occupied. At this time the second echelon was to strengthen the defense in crisis areas, as well as – to block and eliminate the enemy breakthrough groups by counterattacks and causing them fire damage.

Fire system was built with the expectation of coordinated by tasks, place and time use of all fire weapons for the purpose of a constant and growing fire impact on the enemy. It was supposed to link the fire of all means of destruction (including nuclear strikes, airstrikes by tactical and army aviation, field artillery, etc.) with the nature of the terrain and the system of obstacles.

== Usage scenario ==
To successfully implement the area defense and disrupt the enemy's offensive before their forces reached the front line, it was planned to conduct combat operations on the far approaches, to launch preemptive strikes and artillery counterpreparation. In the support zone his forces were to become a target for the covering troops, whose task was to disorganize the enemy offensive, slow it down, mislead about the true configuration of the defensive lines by means of laying mines, using counterattacks and all sorts of deterrent actions. With the emergence of the enemy at the leading edge was not excluded strikes on him by the advanced forces after conducting appropriate counterpreparation.

The most important and difficult stage was the fighting for the forward defense area. During this the task of the first echelon was to hold their positions for a long time and inflict the maximum possible damage to enemy forces. If part of the first echelon was destroyed, it was assumed that the integrity of the combat order should be restored by the general reserve or second echelon units. If the forward positions could not be held and the fighting spread deep into the occupied territory, the encroaching enemy groups were to be counterattacked to restore the defensive perimeter. If this were unsuccessful, the tactic of blocking the enemy who had broken through was used to bring the higher-level reserves to bear.

== See also ==
- AirLand Battle

== Bibliography ==
- Глазунов Н., Масленников П. Сухопутные войска капиталистических государств. — Moscow: Voenizdat, 1980. — 416 с.
