= Fremantle submarine base =

Former submarine base in Fremantle Harbour

- Perth, Western Australia, Australia
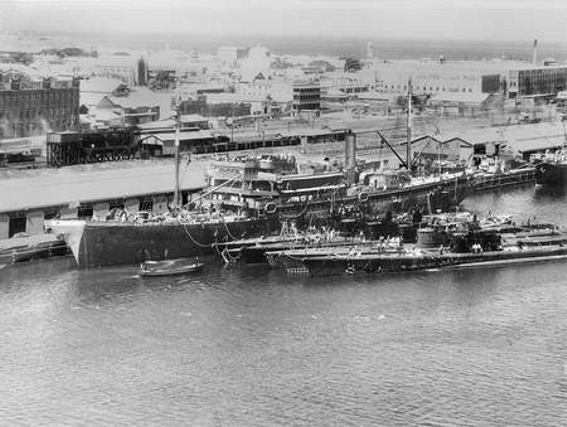
- The submarine tender USS Holland with five American submarines at Fremantle in 1942

Site history
- In use: 1942−1945

Garrison information
- Past commanders: John E. Wilkes (March–May 1942) Charles A. Lockwood (May–December 1942) Allan R. McCann (acting, January 1943) Ralph Waldo Christie (February 1943–December 1944) James Fife (December 1944–1945)

Fremantle submarine base was the utilisation of Fremantle Harbour as a submarine base in World War II. The submarine base was second only to Pearl Harbor in the Pacific theatre, with US, British and Dutch submarines operating from Fremantle during the war. US submarines operating from Fremantle accounted for approximately one quarter of all US submarine patrols in the Pacific.

== Secrecy ==
Knowledge of its existence was very carefully guarded as a wartime secret. However, in August 1945, newspaper reports openly acknowledged the impact of the forces' activity.

== History ==
=== Background ===
At the time of the Japanese attack on Pearl Harbor, 29 US submarines were based at Naval Base Manila, Philippines, as part of the United States Asiatic Fleet, which were attacked by the Japanese on 10 December 1941. One of those, the USS Sealion (SS-195), was sunk while the remainder escaped to sea. From the Philippines, some of these submarines escaped to the Dutch East Indies, from where they operated in the following two months. When the bases at Surabaya and Tjilatjap were also overrun by the Japanese, these submarines escaped further. Initially, Naval Base Darwin was considered as a base but the facilities there were insufficient and within striking range of land-based Japanese aircraft.

Consequently, Fremantle, which was well out of reach of land-based Japanese aircraft, became the main base of the US submarines, with the first ten arriving by 10 March 1942. Apart from the US submarines, three Dutch submarines also arrived in Fremantle at the time, while four others of the Dutch submarines had escaped to Ceylon. Fremantle provided a safe, large harbour, but had the disadvantage of being far away from the submarines' patrol areas and being difficult to reinforce should a Japanese attack take place. Despite this remoteness, experience taught the US command to be cautious and to split the submarines in Fremantle and send five of them and a submarine tender, the USS Holland (AS-3), even further south on 15 March, to Albany, where Holland stayed for the next four months.

=== Emergency of March 1942 ===
The establishment of the base was directly related to what was known as the Japanese Scare of March 1942, the most significant event for Western Australia being the attack on Broome.

The base later became a major US Navy facility, with submarines based there attacking Japanese shipping throughout South East Asia. It involved mainly submarines from the US navy, but also included submarines from other forces.

=== 1942 ===
Following the retreat from the Philippines, Captain John E. Wilkes, who had supervised the retreat, became the first commander of the submarines based at Fremantle, a role he held from March to May 1942. Under Wilkes, the submarines heading out on patrol from Fremantle sank only a modest amount of tonnage, but this was largely due to the fact that the boats were utilised for special missions rather than outright patrols, specifically, supplying and rescuing troops in the Philippines.

Wilkes was replaced by Captain Charles A. Lockwood on 22 May 1942, who held the position until December that year. Lockwood's first task was to raise the morale of the submariners under his command, which he perceived as being very low because of the constant retreat they had experienced until then. Lockwood's other tasks were to replace the aging S-boat submarines in his command with newer models and to deal with reliability issues with the Mark 14 torpedoes used, which were found to run deeper than set in trials ordered by him, causing them to miss their targets.

Altogether, 26 US submarines carried out 61 patrols from Fremantle during 1942, sinking 40 enemy ships in the process.

=== 1943 ===
In January 1943, Lockwood became Commander, Submarine Force, U.S. Pacific Fleet, with Captain Allan R. McCann acting as his replacement until Rear Admiral Ralph Waldo Christie took over permanently a month later.

The first half of 1943 brought only limited success for the submarines based at Fremantle. The number of patrols per month remained low, at four. With the low number of patrols, the number of sunken enemy ships was also low, at a confirmed total of 19 with a tonnage of 87,350. Worse, with the loss of USS Grenadier (SS-210) which had to be abandoned by its crew after being damaged, the base also lost its first submarine. Attempts to establish a base further north, at Exmouth, to cut the necessary travel time to the patrol areas for the boats by two days each way, also failed because of unsuitable conditions and a lack of infrastructure there.

The second half of the year saw a turnaround of events for the Fremantle submariners. All up, 32 patrols were conducted during the six months, sinking 47 enemy ships with a tonnage in excess of 200,000, more than doubling the success rate of the previous six months. Having previously gone twelve months without a submarine loss, the second half of 1943 saw the disappearance of USS Grayling (SS-209), only three month after Grenadier but, unlike the latter, there were no survivors of Grayling.

=== Emergency of March 1944 ===
Like in March 1942, two years later, in March 1944, Western Australia was once more beset by fears of a Japanese attack. Unlike in 1942, when a potential Japanese invasion was the main concern, this time a naval attack was feared. As a consequence, two of the submarine tenders were relocated south to Albany, submarine crews were recalled from leave and the boats send out to form a protective cordon for the port. Aircraft and ground forces were mobilised as well but the scare passed within two weeks and operations quickly returned to normal.

=== 1944 ===
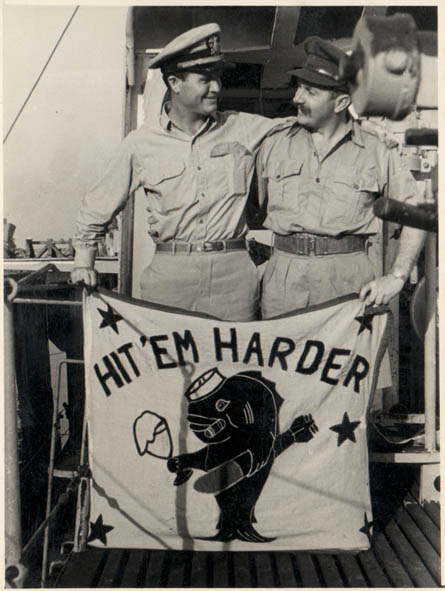
Samuel David Dealey (left), commander of the USS Harder (SS-257), a boat successful in six patrols until sunk by the Japanese with all hands lost in August 1944

The first half of 1944 saw another increase in patrols, number of ships and tonnage sunk, despite the fact that March, because of the fears of attack, saw only two patrols go out. The number of submarine patrols from Fremantle was increased to an average of nine and 75 enemy ships were sunk in the period, with a tonnage of almost 320,000. April 1944 saw the best monthly total so far, accounting for almost a third of the six month total.

After no submarine losses from Fremantle for almost a year, July and August saw the loss of three submarines in quick succession, USS Robalo (SS-273), USS Flier (SS-250) and USS Harder (SS-257). Harder was lost without survivors while four of the crew of Robalo may have survived the initial sinking, but not captivity. Of the crew of Flier, at least thirteen survived the initial sinking but only eight of those made it ashore. Uniquely, these eight were rescued and returned to Australia without ever falling into Japanese hands, being helped by Filipino Guerilla fighters and picked up by another US submarine.

The second half of 1944 saw the arrival of British submarines at Fremantle, which previously had been engaged in the Mediterranean, then moved to Ceylon and, finally, to Western Australia. The first to arrive was HMS Porpoise, on 10 August, followed by the depot ship HMS Maidstone in early September while the eleven submarines attached to the ship first carried out patrols in the Strait of Malacca before arriving at Fremantle as well. It was the first time that Royal Navy ships were based in Western Australia, with the contingent also including two Dutch submarines. While the new base was popular with the British submariners, offering superior opportunities for recreation between patrols, in comparison to Ceylon, the remote location meant the submarine patrols were longer than the previous short ones from the island. With 52 days on one patrol from Fremantle, HMS Tantalus set a new record for the longest patrol of a British submarine during the war so far from October to December 1944.

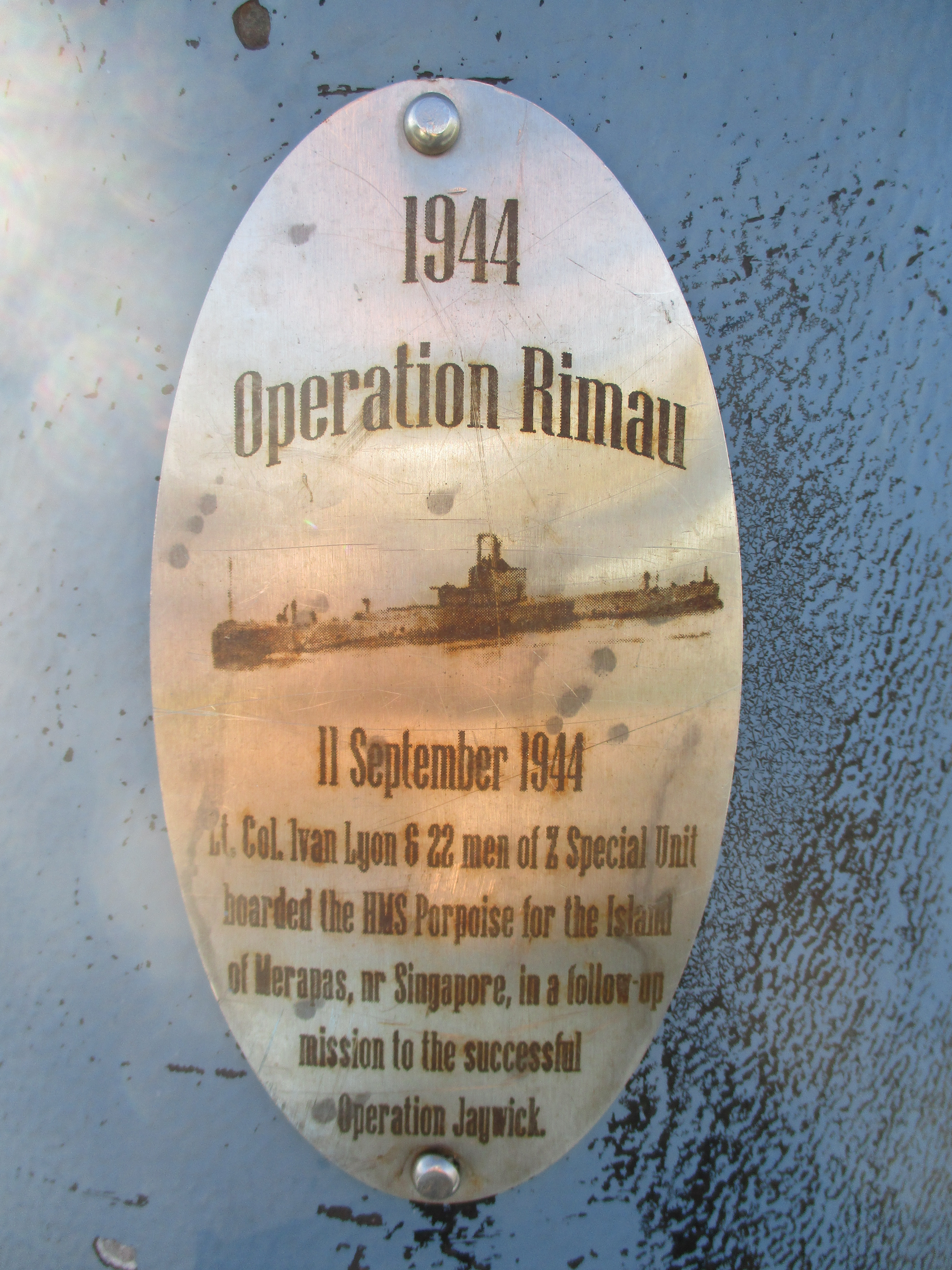
Commemorative plaque for HMS Porpoise and Operation Rimau in Rockingham, Western Australia

British submarines, smaller than their American counterparts, were predominantly used in shallower water, and against smaller craft, which they attacked with their deck gun rather than torpedoes. This approach carried a number of risks, it being harder for a submarine to hide in shallow water and the gun crew being exposed to enemy defensive fire.

British submarines based in Fremantle were also heavily involved in special operations. Porpoise became the first British submarine to go on patrol from Fremantle in September 1944 and was selected, because of its size, to carry Western Australia-trained members of the Z Special Unit on the unsuccessful Operation Rimau.

The second half of 1944 proved to be the pinnacle of the war efforts of the US submariners based in Fremantle. In 83 patrols, the boats sank 105 enemy ships at a combined tonnage of 445,000. Admiral Christie, in charge of the Fremantle submarines since 1943 and overall commander of all US submarines in Australia for a brief period in November and December 1944, was informed of his upcoming replacement soon after. Christie was most likely replaced because of his insistence of having the late Samuel David Dealey, commander of Harder, decorated with the Medal of Honor, something he did succeed in once back in the US. His replacement, Rear Admiral James Fife, took over on Christmas Day 1944.

=== 1945 ===
The first two month of 1945 saw a continuation of the success rates of 1944 for the Fremantle-based submarines, sinking 27 enemy ships with a total tonnage of 77,000. The following six months, until the end of the war, this dropped off however, with exactly the same number of confirmed sinkings in the final half a year of the war for submarines from Fremantle, the number of larger enemy targets sharply dropping off during the final stage of the war. This figure does however not include craft under a tonnage of 500, which the Joint Army–Navy Assessment Committee did not count in this figure. Smaller craft of that size or below were often sunk with deck guns rather than torpedoes. There had been some reluctance to attack smaller craft earlier in the war but, in May 1944, the British Admiralty, allowed the sinking of such vessels in the Far East. British submarines consequently sank 300 such craft in 1944 and another 400 in 1945. The US submarines only accounted for 200 such vessels in 1944, but tripled this figure in 1945.

With the reconquest of the Philippines, US submarines returned to bases there. Subic Bay was first used in February and Fife relocated his headquarters there in May 1945. Fremantle was still used as a base while Subic Bay, with its very basic facilities, was not a popular location for British and American submariners.

Dutch submarine HNLMS O 19, operating from Fremantle, was lost in July 1945, when it struck a reef while on its way to Subic Bay. The crew was able to be rescued by USS Cod (SS-224), which had to destroy O 19 to prevent it from falling into enemy hands. The last of the Fremantle-based submarines to be lost during the war was the USS Bullhead (SS-332), sunk on 6 August 1945, the same day an atomic bomb was dropped over Hiroshima. With the end of World War II, US submarines soon left Fremantle, the last one on 31 August 1945, while British submarines remained in Australia for the time being.

From 1942 to 1945, submarines based at Fremantle sank 377 ships, 340 of those sunk by American boats, this figure not including small crafts. The combined tonnage of these 377 ships was 1,519,322 tons. The Japanese government and its leaders at the time ranked the destruction of the Japanese merchant navy through submarine warfare as one of the root causes for the country's defeat. On the US side, 22 percent of all submariners on patrol during the war lost their lives, and only eight of the 43 US submarines lost during the Pacific War had survivors.

== Utilisation ==
When it was fully active the base saw 160 American, British and Dutch submarines pass through the harbour.

The base was tied in with the Indian Ocean campaign of 1942–45. Military historians looking at the strategy in the South East Asian Theatre look upon the command of the Commander Submarines, South West Pacific (COMSUBSOWESPAC), and the facility of the Fremantle base as integral to successes in 1943 onwards.

During the war, 127 US submarines operated from Fremantle, carrying out 353 patrols. Fremantle-based submarines carried out 22% of US submarine patrols during the Pacific war but were responsible for 58% of Japanese tankers sunk.. Additionally, ten Dutch submarines also operated out of Fremantle and, from August 1944, British submarines also started operating from the base. Altogether, submarines based in Fremantle accounted for 416 patrols during the war.

Of the US submarines operating from Fremantle, eight were lost on patrol while a further ten formerly based at Fremantle subsequently were lost while on patrol from another base. One Dutch and one British submarine were also lost while operating out of Fremantle.

== Installations ==
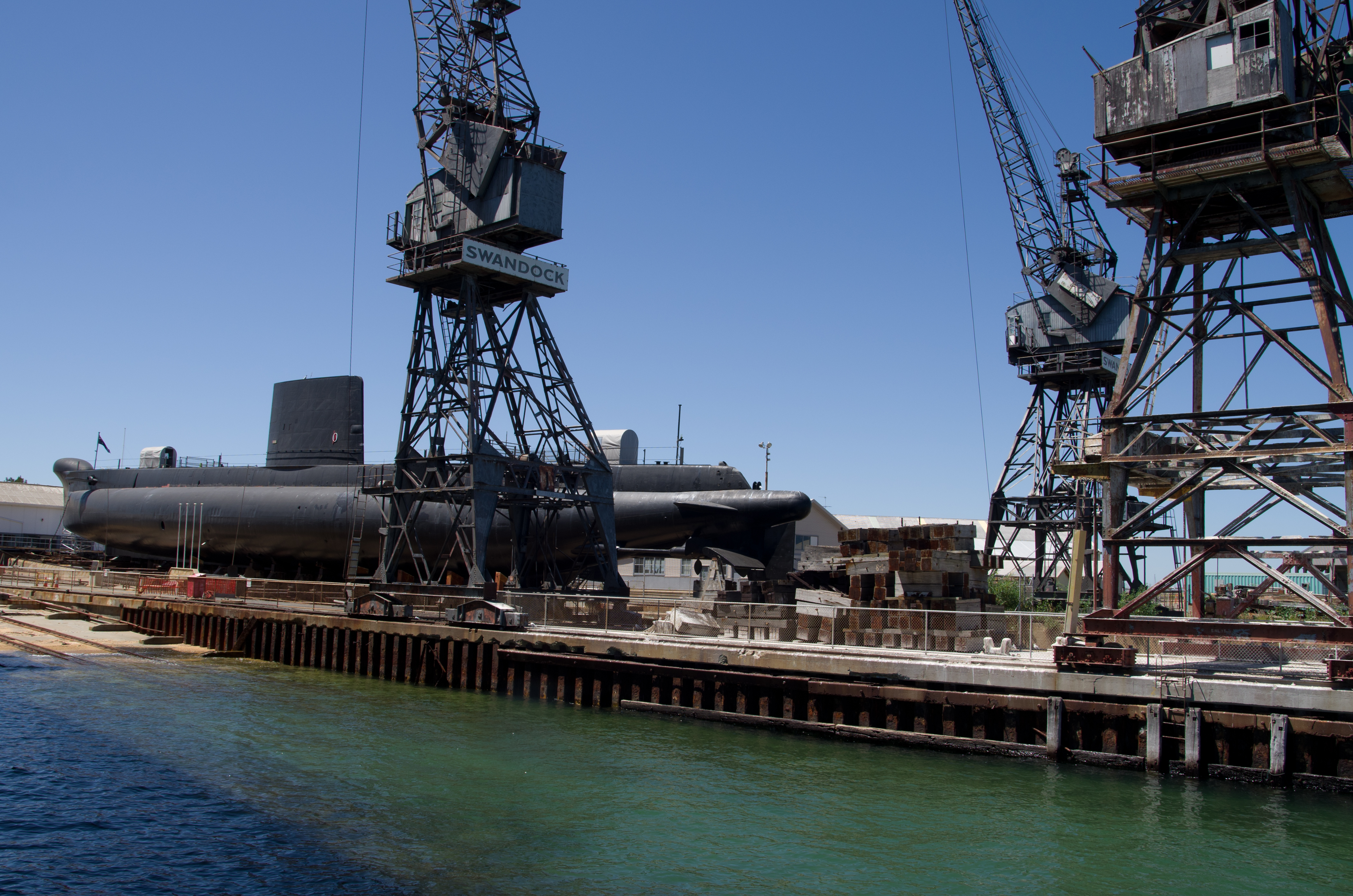
Victoria Quay slipways, with HMAS Ovens

Various buildings and properties in Fremantle were requisitioned as part of the support of the base, and remained so until late 1945. Other facilities further from the coast were also utilised for support, such as the Byford armament depot, which stored torpedoes and mines. Also anti-aircraft gun installations were set up near the base. 4000 tons of ammunition including torpedoes was stored at US Navy 137 – 7 Naval Ammunition Depot (7NAD) at Springhill, near Northam.

Construction of a slipway for the maintenance of submarines and other vessels was begun in 1940 and completed in September 1942. The slipway was in use until 1998 and is now home to HMAS Ovens as part of the WA Maritime Museum.

Coastal defences for the seaward approaches to Fremantle, the Fremantle Fortress, included batteries on Rottnest Island (2), the suburban beaches between Swanbourne and Point Peron at the lower end of Cockburn Sound (3), Garden Island (4), as well as at the mouth of the harbour (2).

Heavy anti-aircraft gun stations were concentrated mostly along the coast around Cockburn Sound. The northernmost was at Cottesloe, and the southernmost was at South Rockingham. Light anti-aircraft gun sites were much more confined to the Fremantle Harbour area (8) and Swan River, Melville Water area (6). Also there were 20 anti-aircraft searchlight stations as back-up to the gun stations.

== Effect on community ==
In 2014, the work by Deborah Gare and Madison Lloyd-Jones When war came to Fremantle 1899–1945 gives a pictorial and textual understanding of the impact of the allied servicemen associated with the submarine base. Also collections of oral history in Battye Library include numbers of people remembering from their childhood the impact of the base, and of American servicemen living in Perth in the 1940s.

Unlike Eastern Australia, where relations between American soldiers and the local population at times soured, the submariners remained popular with the Western Australian population. Many of the American sailors saw Fremantle and Perth as the best spots in the Pacific for leave during patrols. Western Australia saw far less US service men pass through than the eastern States, where up to 100,000 US military personnel were present at its peak. Submariners also saw themselves as an elite force and had undergone careful selection and training for their roles.

For the isolated Western Australian population, the presence of a submarine base at Fremantle also alleviated the fear of being abandoned and defenceless, especially in the early stages of the Pacific war when the state felt under threat of a Japanese invasion or attack with very limited defences.

African American submariners based in Fremantle reported being treated well and without prejudice, in contrast to the East Coast, where the first contingent arriving in Melbourne in 1942 was barred from landing by custom officials, something overridden by Australian authorities. They were however forbidden contact with Aboriginal Australian women, something enforced by both the Western Australian police and the US military. Despite this, African Americans and Aboriginal Australians did socialise together in so-called safe houses.

== Submarine tenders and assisting ships ==
- USS Clytie (AS-26)
- USS Holland (AS-3)
- USS Anthedon (AS-24)
- USS Pelias (AS-14)
- USS Otus (AS-20)

== Refits and repairs ==
Submarines known to have been repaired or refitted at Fremantle include:

- USS Capitaine (SS-336)

== Losses ==
The numbers of submarines lost that while operating out of the Fremantle submarine base included:

Lost in 1943

- USS Grenadier (SS-210)
- USS Grayling (SS-209)

Lost in 1944

- USS Robalo (SS-273)
- USS Flier (SS-250)
- USS Harder (SS-257)
- USS Growler (SS-215)

Lost in 1945

- USS Barbel (SS-316)
- USS Bullhead (SS-332)
- HNLMS O 19

== Dismantling base and facilities ==
In September 1945 at the end of the war, the dismantling of the submarine base included the USS Anthedon (AS-24) being involved with removing submarine repair facilities.

== Memorial ==
- The most significant memorial to lost submariners who had been based in Fremantle is the periscope project on Memorial Hill, Fremantle.
- US submarine USS Bullhead (SS-332) memorial at the Western Australia Aviation Museum. Bullhead was the last US Naval vessel, to be lost in World War II, with 84 crew.

== See also ==
- Auxiliary Albany Submarine Base
- United States Navy submarine bases
- World War II United States Merchant Navy
