= 7 Naval Ammunition Depot =

Ammunition Depot in Western Australia

Coordinates: 31.7253°S 116.6760°E

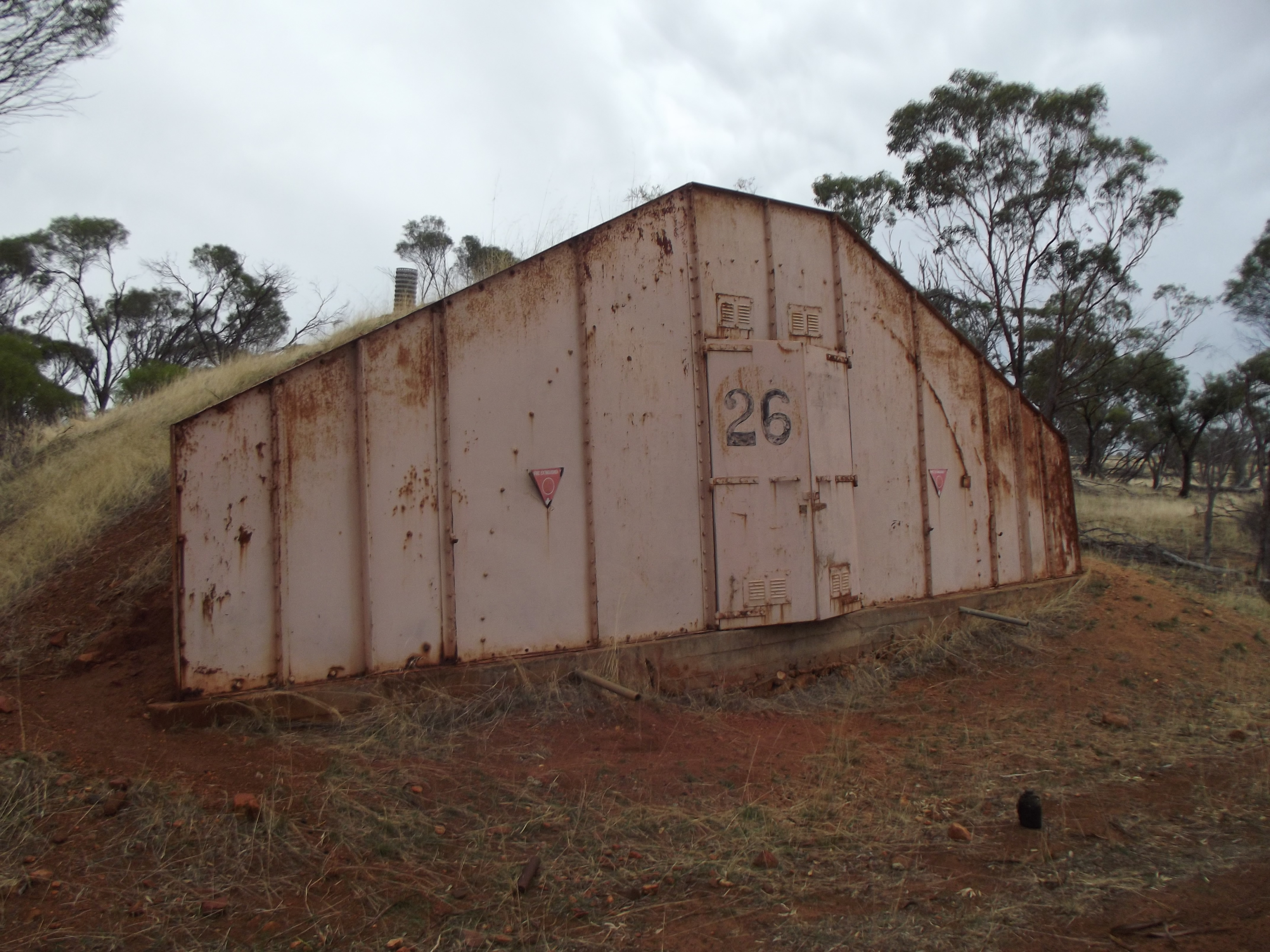
Ammunition Bunker No.26, US Navy 7NAD, Springhill

US Navy 7 Naval Ammunition Depot (7 NAD) was located at Springhill, near Northam, Western Australia. It was one of three US Naval Ammunition Depots developed across Australia during World War II to support the service's operations in the South West Pacific.

== Background ==
With the first bombing of Darwin in the Northern Territory on 19 February 1942 and the following 64 bombings of the same city then later Wyndham, Broome and Onslow in Western Australia, the Australian Government sought land to establish ammunition depots. Springhill was chosen for its distance from the Indian Ocean coast, in terms of security and concealment, and was serviced by rail with a close-by airstrip. An area of 202 hectares of farmland was compulsorily acquired and developed as the Australian Army Central Ammunition Depot (CAD) designated 6 CAD for Western Australia, with an area divided off for the NAD.

After making an emergency withdrawal of submarines and warships of the United States Navy (USN), the British and Dutch Navies from the Philippines and Java later in February 1942, the withdrawal from submarine bases in Darwin and later Exmouth then called Potshot, the decision was made to base the submarines of the USN 7th Fleet’s Task Force 71 at Fremantle. An auxiliary base was also developed in Albany.

The moves and transitions in policy and subsequent activity became known as the Western Australian emergency of March 1942.

The decision to move south resulted in a large USN submarine base facility and infrastructure being established at Fremantle from 1942, such base operating until the end of World War II in 1945. This base became the second largest submarine base in the world at the time, the largest in the Southern Hemisphere.

Task Force 71 of the US Navy’s 7th Fleet was initially commanded by Rear Admiral Charles A. Lockwood who was later relieved by Rear Admiral Ralph Waldo Christie on 7 March 1943, who was later again relieved by Admiral James Fife, Jr. on 30 December 1944.

Approximately 170 American, British and Dutch submarines made a total of 416 war patrols out of Fremantle Submarine Base during World War II, some with deadly action against the enemy and others not returning.

The US 7th Fleet Naval Receiving Barracks was established in what was known then as the Old Women’s Home now known as the Fremantle Arts Centre located in Finnerty Street, Fremantle. It housed 19 Officers and 670 enlisted men with 22 additional housing structures built at the rear. The administrative offices of the US Naval Supply Depot occupied the first floor of the Dalgety's Building, Queen Victoria Street, Fremantle.

The USN later purchased land in the area of 6 CAD at Springhill, near Northam and constructed a Naval Ammunition Depot (NAD) designated 7 NAD to supply ammunition to warships and in particular torpedoes for submarines of the US 7th Fleet operating from the newly established Fremantle Submarine Base. The base also serviced, supplied and repaired submarines operated by the Royal Navy and the Royal Netherlands Navy (the Koninklijke Marine).

== Establishment ==
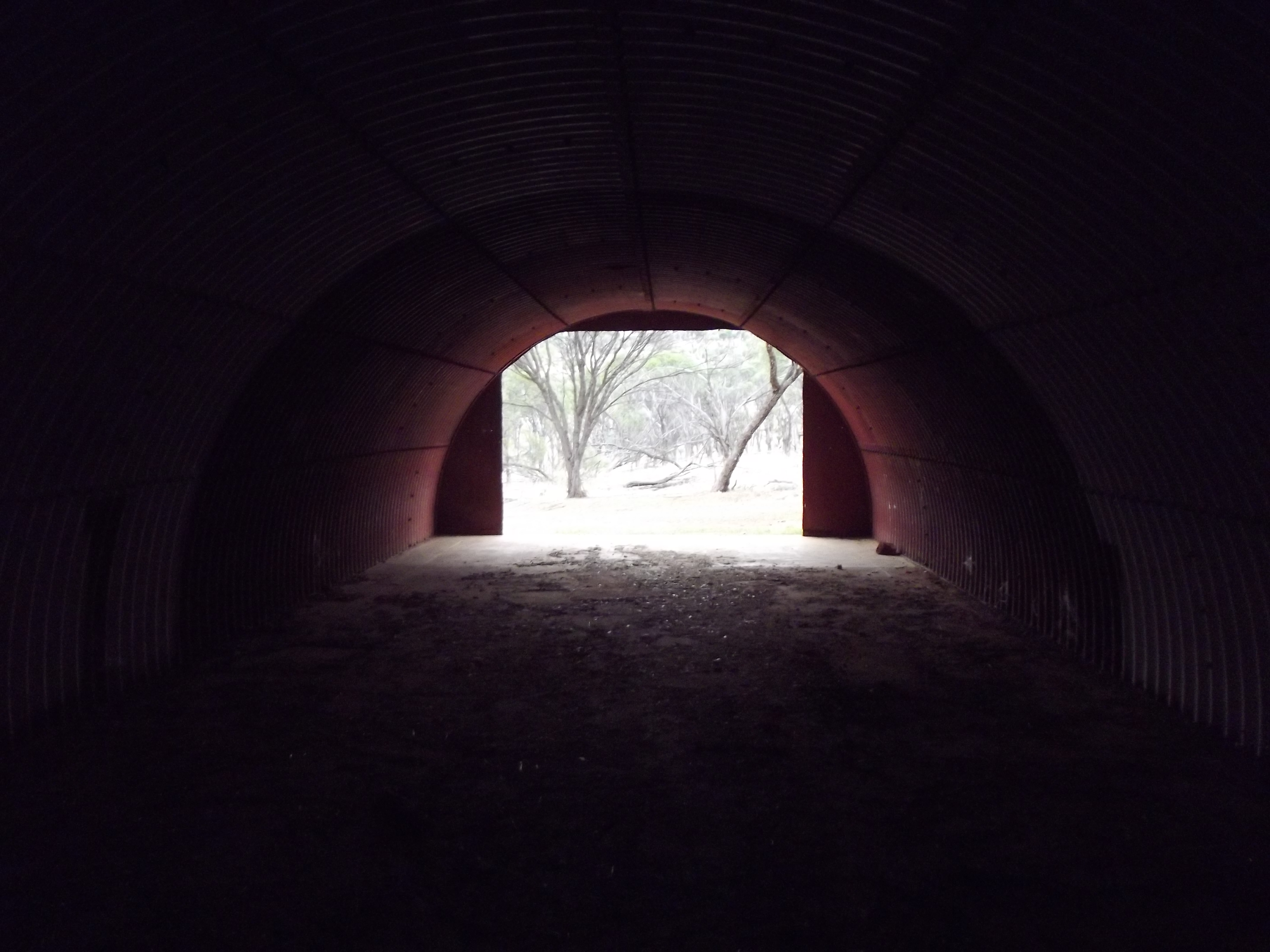
Ammunition Bunker looking out, US Navy 7NAD, Springhill

7 NAD was attached to the 137 Ammunition and Ordnance Unit more commonly referred to as Navy 137, located predominately at Springhill except for a torpedo technical depot established in Subiaco in Perth becoming operational in July 1943. To facilitate the transfer of ordnance from Springhill, 100 kilometres to the harbour at Fremantle, magazines were also constructed at Fremantle (HMAS Leeuwin now Leeuwin Barracks) and Woodman Point. These technical workshops checked and readied the torpedoes for loading onto submarines in the Fremantle Harbour.

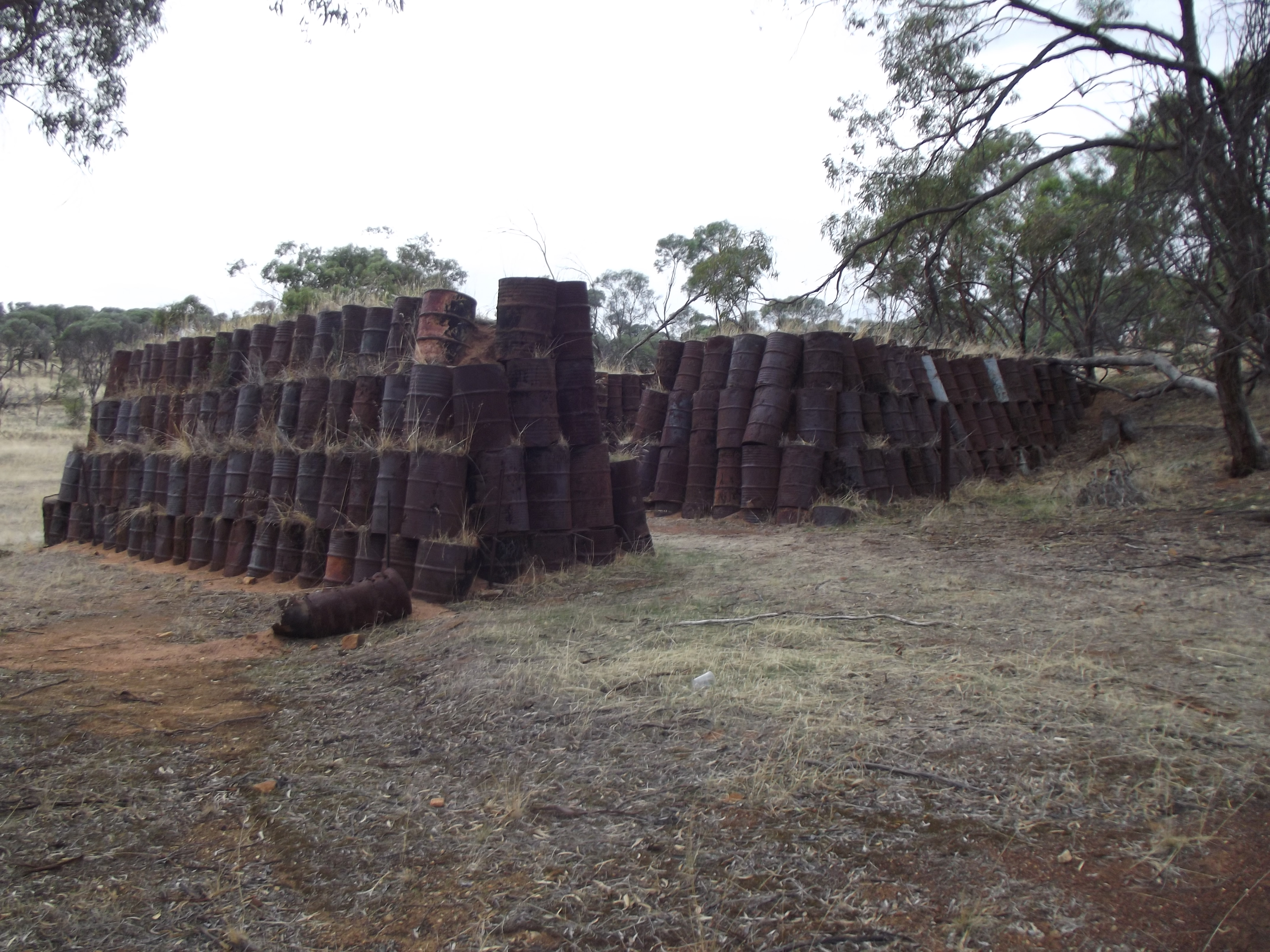
Concrete reinforced drums, US Navy 7NAD, Springhill

Navy 137 was used for the storage of torpedoes, naval and army gun ammunition, anti-tank mines and small arms ordnance with approximately 4,000 tons of ordnance being stored and maintained which arrived by rail from the Fremantle Harbour each rail load weighing 400 tons. For security, personnel from the nearby 7 Supply Depot at Spencers Brook were utilised as guards and concrete anti-tank defences were constructed surrounding the Springhill depot site, which fortunately were never put to the test.

The mission of the US Naval Magazine, Navy 137, Springhill was to:

Stow, issue, and receive ammunition for Service Force Subordinate Command Seventh Fleet. Conduct prescribed Bureau of Ordnance tests; namely tests of smokeless powder, monthly breakdown and inspection report. Approximately 4000 tons of ammunition maintained.

7 NAD Springhill predominately stored the Mark 14 torpedo which was the primary submarine-launched, anti-surface ship torpedo used in World War II until the introduction of the electric Mark 18 Torpedo. Approximately 4,000,000 tons of enemy shipping were sunk by the Mark 14 torpedo. Originally introduced for use as mechanically-set torpedo, the Mark 14 was modified for use with modern fire control systems and designated Mod 5.

7 NAD was one of three other US Naval Ammunition Depots in Australia with the other two at Mount Coot-tha, Brisbane (Navy 134) and at Newington, Sydney (Navy 135).

Whilst they were designed to exclude the use of mechanical handling equipment or palletisation methods, these storehouses, as later Royal Australian Army Ordnance Corps (RAAOC) units could testify, made excellent wine cellars and mushroom farms.

== Buildings and structures ==
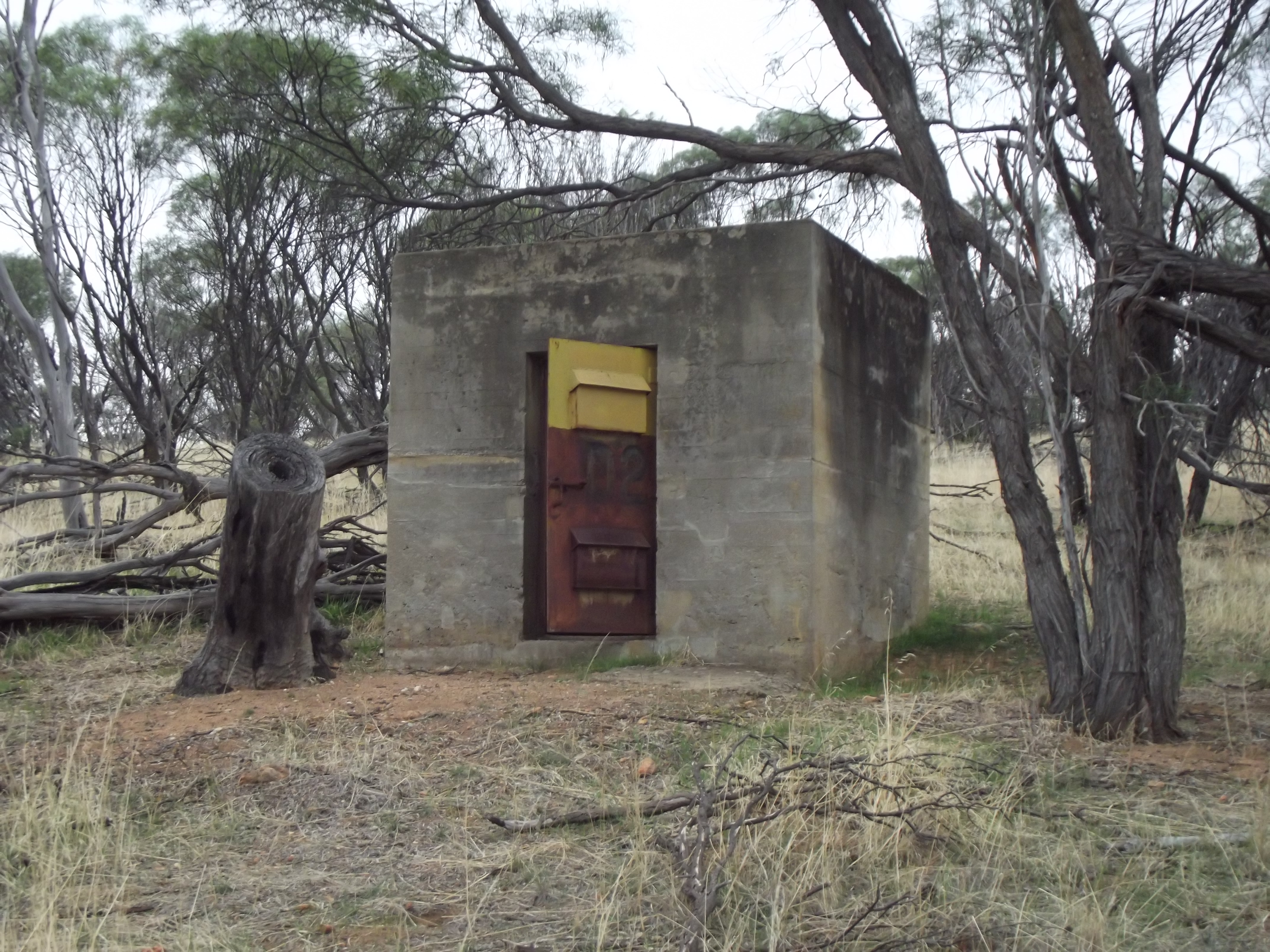
Detonator Hut No. 2, US Navy 7NAD, Springhill

Navy 137 had a total of 109 magazines and structures at Springhill to house and maintain the ammunition as follows:

Type	Construction	Size	No. of buildings
Magazines	Arch	1,000 sq ft each	9
Magazines	Tubular steel	1,200 sq ft each	9
Magazines	Tubular steel	720 sq ft each	9
Detonator huts	Concrete	36 sq ft each	6
Workshop	Quonset hut	778 sq ft each	1
Isolation hut	Quonset hut	270 sq ft each	1
Shelters, standard	Timber & tin	304 sq ft	28
Shelters, modified	Timber & tin	238 sq ft	46

== Accommodation and staffing ==
The Commanding Officer, Lieutenant George Wickens USN had a staff of one officer and 50 enlisted men accommodated in 9 Quonset huts. With the 109 ammunition structures there were 118 buildings within the depot.

=== Social life ===
The men attended dance nights at the Lesser Town Hall in Northam with a number of men commencing relationships with the local Northam women which developed into some of the first war brides to leave Australia.

=== Facilities ===
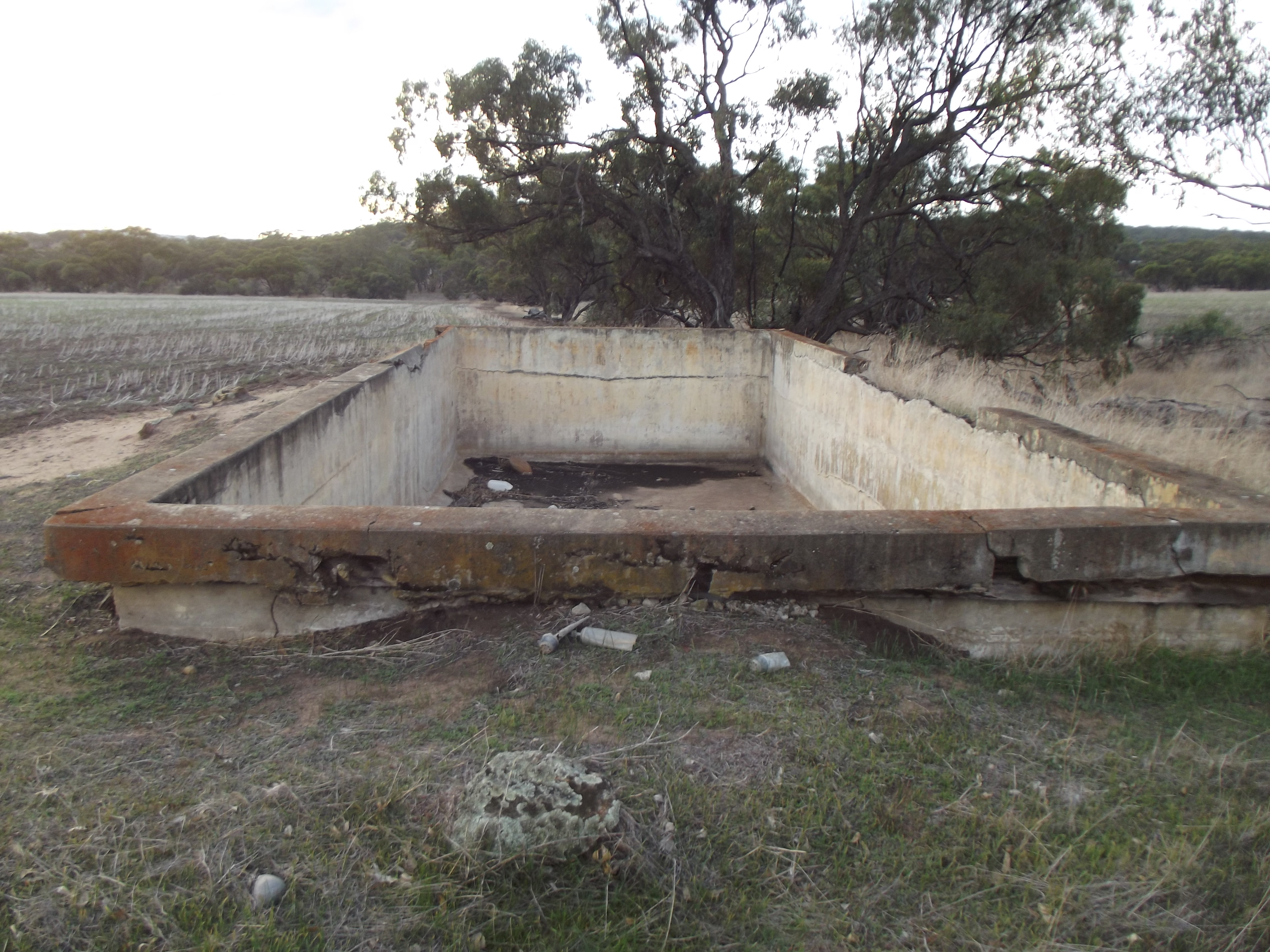
Remains of swimming pool, US Navy 7NAD, Springhill

One aspect of living in the depot was the swimming pool, the structure of which remains today. This concrete pool was apparently also used for scuba diving training.

The water supply was from wells on Australian Army Ammunition Depot 6CAD to the North. A small household washing machine was provided for the men to do their own laundry. Power was supplied by diesel generator located on the camp. A septic tank is provided for sewerage. All of these facilities together with messing facilities were, according to the Americans, adequate for the camp.

== Rail ==
A spur line connected the depot 6 CAD and Navy 137 from the Northam to Spencers Brook Railway line which connected the area onwards to Midland and Fremantle Harbour.
