= Japanese tugboat Hokkai Maru =

History

Empire of Japan
- Name: Hokkai Maru
- Builder: Osaka Iron Works Co., Ltd.
- Laid down: 6 November 1941
- Launched: 18 February 1942
- Sponsored by: Ministry of the Army
- Completed: 10 August 1942
- Stricken: 12 November 1942
- Home port: Hiroshima
- Fate: Torpedoed and sunk, 12 November 1942
- Notes: Call sign: JSAR

General characteristics
- Type: High-powered tugboat
- Tonnage: 457 GRT
- Length: 45 m (147 ft 8 in) o/a
- Beam: 8.8 m (28 ft 10 in)
- Draught: 4.1 m (13 ft 5 in)

Hokkai Maru (Japanese: 北海丸) was a rescue tug of the Imperial Japanese Army during World War II. She was the first of three ships of her class succeeding the Shōkai Maru class of high-powered tugboats.

== History ==
Hokkai Maru was laid down on 6 November 1941 by Osaka Iron Works Co., Ltd. (株式會社大阪鐵工所本社造船所) at the behest of the Ministry of the Army (陸軍省). She was launched on 18 February 1942 and completed on 10 August 1942. She was made of steel and registered in Hiroshima. She was fitted as a rescue tug. On 12 November 1942, she was attacked and sunk by torpedoes fired from the American submarine USS Grenadier off the coast of Vietnam, south of Cam Ranh Bay (11°18′N 109°02′E). She was struck from the Navy List on 12 November 1942.
