= USS Triton (SS-201) =

Tambor-class submarine in service 1940-1943

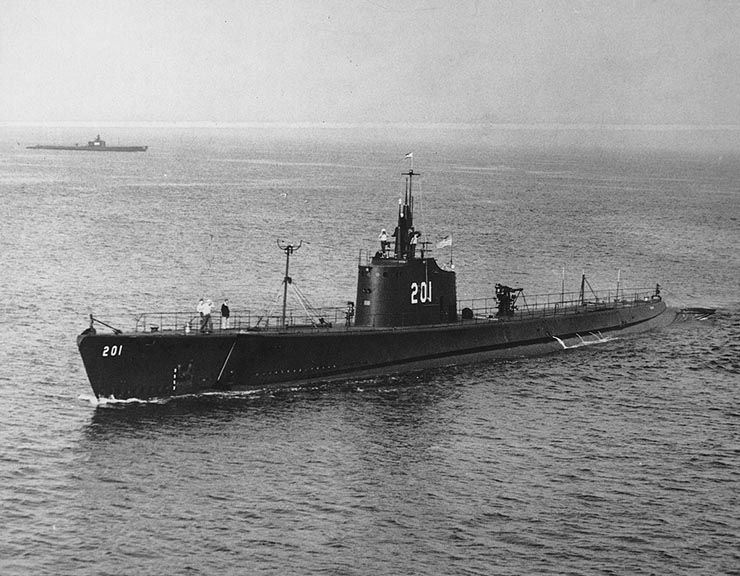
- SS-201 Triton, c. 1940

History

United States
- Builder: Portsmouth Naval Shipyard, Kittery, Maine
- Laid down: 5 July 1939
- Launched: 25 March 1940
- Commissioned: 15 August 1940
- Fate: Sunk by Japanese destroyers off the Admiralty Islands, 15 March 1943

General characteristics
- Class & type: Tambor class diesel-electric submarine
- Displacement: 1,475 long tons (1,499 t) standard, surfaced; 2,370 tons (2,408 t) submerged
- Length: 307 ft 2 in (93.62 m)
- Beam: 27 ft 3 in (8.31 m)
- Draft: 14 ft 7 1/2 in (4.458 m)
- Propulsion: 4 × Fairbanks-Morse Model 38D8-⅛ 9-cylinder opposed piston diesel engines driving electrical generators; 2 × 126-cell Sargo batteries; 4 × high-speed General Electric electric motors with reduction gears; two propellers; 5,400 shp (4.0 MW) surfaced; 2,740 shp (2.0 MW) submerged
- Speed: 20.4 knots (38 km/h) surfaced; 8.75 knots (16 km/h) submerged
- Range: 11,000 nautical miles (20,000 km) at 10 knots (19 km/h), fuel capacity 93,993 US gal (355,800 L) to 96,365 US gal (364,780 L) fuel oil
- Endurance: 48 hours at 2 knots (3.7 km/h) submerged; patrol endurance, up to 75 days
- Test depth: 250 ft (76 m)
- Complement: 6 officers, 54 enlisted
- Armament: 10 × 21 inch (533 mm) torpedo tubes (6 forward, 4 aft; 24 Mark 14 torpedoes or up to 40 mines); one 3 in (76 mm)/50 caliber deck gun; 2 × .30 cal (7.62 mm) machineguns

USS Triton (SS-201) was the fourth Tambor-class submarine to be commissioned in the United States Navy in the years leading up to the country's December 1941 entry into World War II. Her wartime service was in the Pacific Ocean. She completed five patrols in the following 14 months, and is credited with the sinking of over 20,000 tons of Japanese shipping and warships. She was lost with all hands on or around 15 March 1943. Of the twelve Tambor-class submarines, only five survived the war.

Her keel was down on 5 July 1939 by the Portsmouth Navy Yard. She was launched on 25 March 1940 sponsored by Mrs. Martha E. King, wife of Rear Admiral Ernest J. King, and commissioned on 15 August 1940 with Lieutenant Commander Willis A. "Pilly" Lent (Class of 1925) in command. She was the first submarine and third ship of the United States Navy to be named for Triton, a mythological Greek god, the messenger of the sea.

The new submarine held her shakedown training in the Caribbean Sea from 14 January to 26 March 1941 and then conducted training and minelaying exercises in the Portsmouth, New Hampshire - New London, Connecticut area. Triton departed Portsmouth on 1 July, transited the Panama Canal on 12 July, and arrived at San Diego, California, on 20 July. Nine days later, she and sister ship USS Trout (SS-202) headed for Hawaii and arrived at Pearl Harbor on 4 August 1941.

== First patrol ==
Assigned to Submarine Division 62, Triton made a training cruise to Midway from 30 August to 15 September, then participated in local and fleet operations in the Hawaiian area. On 19 November, the submarine headed west to conduct a practice war patrol and arrived off Wake Island on 26 November. On 8 December, she saw columns of smoke rising over the island but assumed it was caused by construction work being done ashore. That night, when she surfaced to charge her batteries, she was informed by radio Wake that Pearl Harbor had been bombed and was ordered to stay out of range of Wake's guns. The next morning, Triton observed the Japanese bombing the island. On the night of 10 December, she was surfaced, charging her batteries, when flashes of light from Wake revealed a destroyer or light cruiser on a parallel course. The submarine was silhouetted against the moon, and the enemy ship turned towards her. Triton went deep and began evasive action. When the Japanese ship slowed astern, the submarine came to 120 feet (37 m) and fired four stern torpedoes—the first American torpedoes shot during World War II—on sonar bearings. She heard a dull explosion 58 seconds later and believed one had hit the target, then went to 175 feet (53 m) and cleared the area. (No sinking was recorded, and she was not credited with one.) After their initial repulse on 11 December, the Japanese returned with two aircraft carriers, Hiryū and Sōryū; Triton was not informed, and made no attacks on them. Neither did she make any effort to evacuate the 350 Marines. On 21 December, the submarine was ordered to return to Hawaii, and she arrived back at Pearl Harbor on 31 December.

== Second patrol ==
On 25 January 1942, Triton got underway for the East China Sea and her second war patrol, covering the sealanes to Dairen, Shanghai, and Korea. She was off Kyūshū on 17 February when she contacted a freighter. The submarine launched four torpedoes and scored one hit in the stern. The target stopped for a few minutes and then slowly got underway. That evening, Triton attacked another freighter with two torpedoes at a range of 1,200 yards (1,100 m). One hit the Japanese cargo ship aft of her well deck, and the maru went dead in the water and began settling. Soon, several heavy explosions marked the end of Shinyo Maru Number 5. Four days later, the submarine intercepted two cargo ships. She sank Shokyu Maru with two torpedoes but could not attack the second ship because of its speed and the appearance of a four-engine patrol plane. On the night of 27 February, the submarine was on the surface for a battery charge when she sighted a ship approximately three miles away. She closed to attack and launched two torpedoes. One torpedo hit, but haze over the water and smoke from the damaged ship prohibited a second attack. Triton made no further contacts and returned to Pearl Harbor on 17 March, where she was praised for an aggressive patrol, earning credit for two ships totalling 12,000 tons (reduced to 5,982 tons postwar), but criticized for excessive use of torpedoes, which were in extremely short supply.

== Third patrol ==
Triton (now in the hands of C.C. Kirkpatrick, Class of 1931) got underway on 13 April to return to the East China Sea. Ten days later, the submarine contacted a 2,000-ton trawler near Marcus, astonishingly stopped and not blacked out. After missing with two torpedoes (at point blank range), she surfaced to engage with her deck guns, firing 19 rounds of three-inch (76 mm) and "a hurricane of small-arms", leaving the trawler a sinking wreck, giving Triton the first confirmed sinking of an enemy vessel by deck gun fire by an American submarine.

Amid shallow, glassy seas and poor sonar conditions, on 1 May, she sighted six freighters, in two columns, escorted by a single torpedo boat. She launched two torpedoes, and both hit the leading ship, Taei Maru (2,200 tons), which sank, then two more at the next freighter; both missed. She fired at a third cargoman but the torpedo ran deep; a second torpedo, set shallow and aimed at a different ship, broke the back of Calcutta Maru (5,300 tons), which promptly sank.

Triton contacted an escorted convoy on 6 May and launched two torpedoes at the trailing ship; one sank soon after leaving the tube, the other missed ahead. She next spotted a destroyer coming to the rear of the convoy, fired two more (both set shallow) at this same ship from 1,200 yards (1,100 m), and went deep to elude. Her sonar heard two violent explosions; Taigen Maru (5,600 tons) had sunk. At that point, the submarine maneuvered around and ahead of the convoy to position for another attack. When she attained the desired position, she launched four torpedoes—two at the third ship and two at a fourth. Triton heard two explosions from the first spread (one in the third ship), none from the second (which had avoided), as she was forced to take evasive action from the escort. The submarine later returned to periscope depth, but no ships were in sight. The convoy had cleared the area. On 15 May, she sank two deep-sea fishing boats with her deck guns.

The next day, after monitoring orders to other boats attempting to intercept without success, Triton ran into position and at 15.20 spotted the crippled Shōkaku and a destroyer, returning from the Battle of the Coral Sea. At 6,700 yards (6,100 m), with the target making 16 knots (30 km/h), Triton could not close the range, despite surfacing and bending on 19½ knots (36 km/h). She sent a contact report, but it was not acknowledged.

One day later, 17 May, in "one of the luckiest finds of the war", I-64 surfaced right in front of Triton; she fired her last bow torpedo from 6,200 yards (5,700 m) and parts of the target were blown 100 feet (30 m) into the air. I-64 (1,700 tons), the fourth Japanese sub sunk by the Pacific Fleet Sub Force, went down by the stern. Four days later, Triton fired her last four torpedoes at another enemy submarine; all missed. The patrol earned her credit for five ships of 24,200 tons (reduced to 15,800 postwar), terminating at Pearl Harbor on 4 June, as the Battle of Midway began.

== Fourth patrol ==
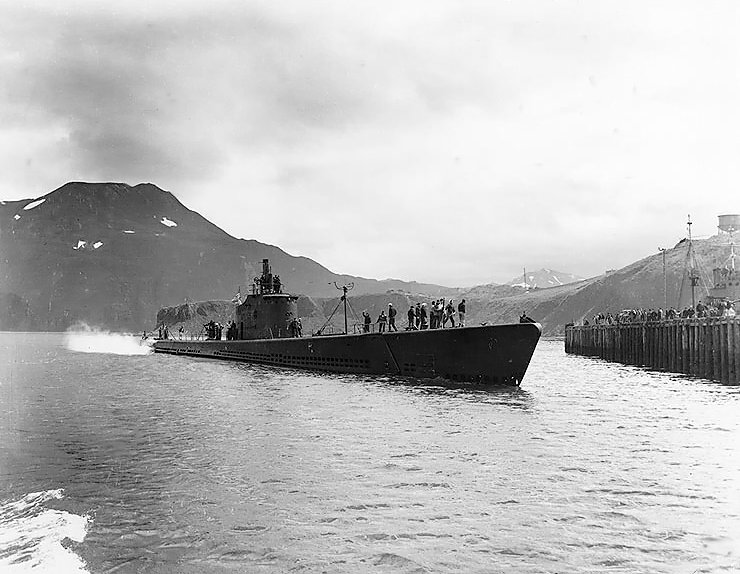
USS Triton at Dutch Harbor, Alaska, 16 July 1942

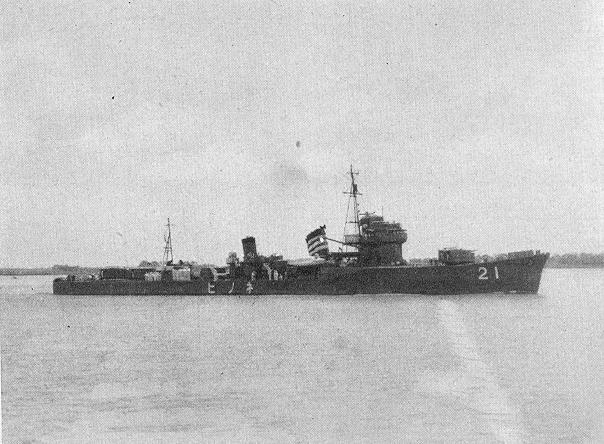
Japanese destroyer Nenohi

Triton's fourth war patrol took her to Alaskan waters and lasted from 25 June to 24 August. On 4 July, she was patrolling in a heavy fog, in the vicinity of Cape Sabok, when the fog lifted enough to reveal a Japanese destroyer. The submarine trailed the enemy for ten hours, in and out of patches of fog, until she had closed the range to 3,000 yards (2,700 m). Triton then launched two torpedoes, and one hit amidships. The Japanese destroyer Nenohi {right} (1,370 tons) capsized to port and slid under the waves in five minutes. Triton sighted a freighter on 28 July, but lost it in a fog bank. The same thing happened the next day. On 9 August, Triton saw an enemy submarine's periscope and prepared to attack. However, the Japanese sub struck first, forcing Triton to go deep as enemy torpedoes passed overhead. On 15 August, Triton launched four torpedoes at a darkened ship from a range of 1,500 yards (1,400 m). There were two consecutive explosions, and flames shot over 200 feet (60 m) into the air. To Triton, the enemy ship appeared to be larger than a destroyer. However, there is no official record of a sinking on that date. The submarine made no further contacts before returning to Pearl Harbor on 7 September, and was credited with two ships for 3,100 tons (postwar, only Nenohi, at 1,600 tons). She then entered Pearl Harbor Navy Yard for an overhaul until 6 December.

== Fifth patrol ==
On 16 December, Triton got underway for a position 20 miles (32 km) east of Wake on the Midway–Wake route. She was one of three submarines stationed between the two islands to mark the way for United States Army Air Forces B-24 Liberator bombers in strikes on Wake and to rescue the crews of any planes forced down at sea. She made no rescues, but, on the night of 23 December, she aided in guiding the Liberators in a night bombing attack on the island. On 24 December, the submarine sighted the mast of a ship on the horizon, headed for Wake anchorage. Triton (alerted by ULTRA) closed to 1,000 yards (910 m) and launched two torpedoes. One hit under the stack, the other under the foremast. Amakasu Maru Number 1 was obliterated in a cloud of smoke and steam as she went under. The submarine then set a course for Brisbane. On 28 December, she sighted an enemy ship, closed to 7,000 yards (6,400 m), and launched three torpedoes into the transport Ōmi Maru. The ship sank almost immediately and, although there was much wreckage, no survivors were seen.

Triton was then ordered to patrol the Truk–Rabaul–New Guinea shipping lanes, north and northwest of New Ireland, arriving on 30 December 1942. On 10 January 1943, Triton stalked an unidentified vessel but withheld her attack upon observing it was marked as a hospital ship. Three days later, she launched four torpedoes at a tanker and scored one hit. When the enemy began firing at her periscope, she went deep to begin an end around. About 20 minutes later, the submarine returned to periscope depth and launched a spread of four torpedoes. Two geysers of water rose amidships as high as the target's bridge, but no explosions followed. The next day, Triton attempted to attack a freighter, but an escort forced her down where she was subjected to a two-hour depth charge attack. On 16 January, she attacked two cargo ships, scoring two hits on the first and one on the second; but her victims forced her to submerge before she could evaluate the damage. Later that day, Triton fired her last three torpedoes at a large freighter but heard no explosions. She then headed for Australia and reached Brisbane on 26 January, with a total of 6,500 tons for the trip.

== Final patrol ==
Falling under the strict tactical control of Admiral James Fife, Jr., Triton (now in the hands of George K. MacKenzie) on 16 February began her sixth and final war patrol, hoping to destroy enemy shipping between the Shortland Basin and Rabaul. She reported smoke on 22 February and a new Japanese radar at Buka. On 6 March, the submarine attacked a convoy of five destroyer-escorted ships, sinking the cargo ship Kiriha Maru and damaging another freighter. One of her torpedoes made a circular run, and Triton went deep to evade it. She attacked another convoy on the night of 8 March and claimed that five of the eight torpedoes she had fired scored hits. She could not observe the results or make a follow-up attack because gunfire from the escorts forced her down. On 11 March, Triton reported she was chasing two convoys, each made up of five or more ships. She was informed Trigger (SS-237) was operating in an adjoining area and ordered to stay south of the equator. On 13 March, Triton was warned that three enemy destroyers, including the Akikaze were in her area either looking for a convoy or hunting American submarines.

On 15 March, Triton reported she had attacked a convoy and had been depth charged. Even though attacks on her ceased, she could still hear distant depth charging for about an hour. No further messages from Triton were ever received. Post-war examination of Japanese records revealed on 15 March 1943, three Japanese destroyers attacked a submarine a little northwest of Triton's assigned area and subsequently observed an oil slick, debris, and items with American markings. On 10 April 1943, Triton was reported overdue from patrol and presumed lost, one of three lost in a month.

== Awards ==
Triton received five battle stars for World War II service.

== Legacy ==
Triton is the subject of an episode of the syndicated television anthology series, The Silent Service, which aired in the United States during the 1957–1958 season.

Triton′s ship's bell was not aboard the submarine when she was lost. It was located in 2011 and is on display at Naval Station Great Lakes in Lake County, Illinois.
