= USS Clytie =

Tender of the United States Navy

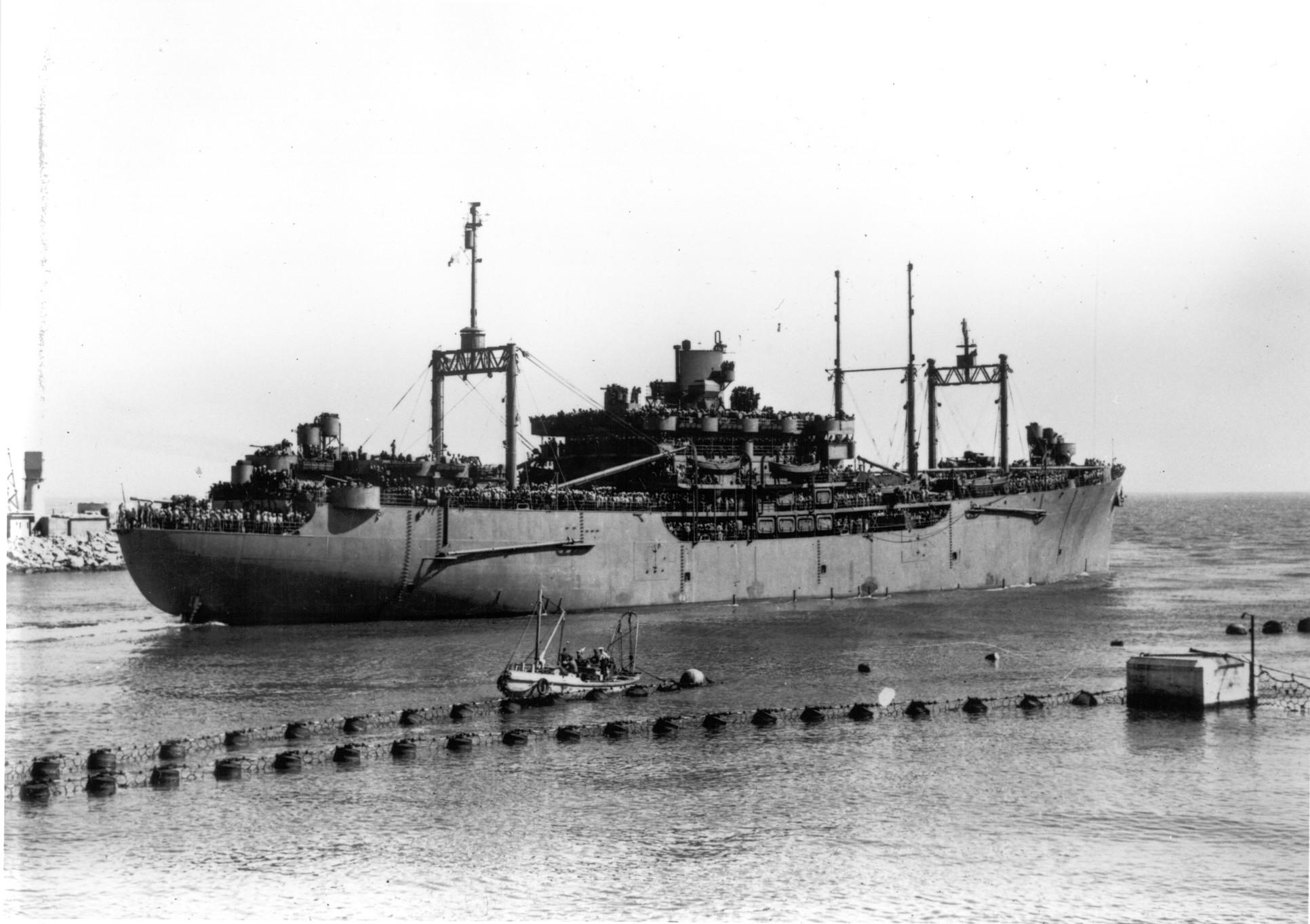
- USS Clytie (AS-26), exiting Fremantle Harbour, Australia, September 1945.

History

United States
- Name: Clytie
- Namesake: Clytie
- Ordered: as type (C3-S-A2) hull, MC hull 861
- Builder: Ingalls Shipbuilding, Pascagoula, Mississippi
- Launched: 26 November 1943
- Acquired: 26 February 1944
- Commissioned: 26 February 1944 (reduced commission)
- Decommissioned: 3 April 1944
- Commissioned: 18 January 1945 (full commission)
- Decommissioned: 5 October 1946
- Identification: Hull symbol: AS-26; Code letters: NBMW
- Fate: Scrapped in 1971

General characteristics
- Class & type: Aegir-class submarine tender
- Displacement: 16,500 long tons (16,800 t) (full)
- Length: 492 ft 6 in (150.11 m)
- Beam: 69 ft 6 in (21.18 m)
- Draft: 27 ft (8.2 m)
- Installed power: 2 × Foster–Wheeler D-type 465 psi (3,210 kPa) 765 °F (407 °C) steam boilers; 8,500 shp (6,300 kW)
- Propulsion: 1 × General Electric steam turbine; General Electric double reduction main gears; 1 × Propeller
- Speed: 18.4 kn (34.1 km/h; 21.2 mph)
- Complement: 82 Officers 1,378 Enlisted
- Armament: 1 × 5 in (127 mm)/38-caliber dual-purpose gun; 4 × single 3 in (76 mm)/50 cal guns; 2 × twin 40 mm (1.6 in) Bofors anti-aircraft (AA) mounts; 20 × 20 mm (0.8 in) Oerlikon cannons AA

USS Clytie (AS-26) was an Aegir-class submarine tender in the United States Navy during World War II.

== Construction ==
Clytie was launched 26 November 1943 by Ingalls Shipbuilding in Pascagoula, Mississippi, under a Maritime Commission contract, MC hull 861. Clytie was sponsored by Mrs. C. H. Leavitt; and transferred to the Navy 26 February 1944, and placed in temporary commission for passage to her conversion yard, Bethlehem Steel Corporation, Hoboken, New Jersey. Clytie was placed in full commission 18 January 1945.

== Service history ==
Clytie sailed from New London 21 February 1945 for Brisbane, and Fremantle submarine base, Western Australia, where she tended submarines of the 7th Fleet from 4 April to 13 September. Returning to New London 17 October, Clytie remained there except for a brief overhaul at Philadelphia until placed out of commission in reserve 5 October 1946.
