= Ōmi Maru =

History

Empire of Japan
- Name: Ōmi Maru
- Operator: Nippon Yusen Kaisha, Tokyo
- Builder: Napier and Miller
- Yard number: 183
- Launched: April 30, 1912
- In service: 1912
- Fate: Sunk December 28, 1942

General characteristics
- Tonnage: 3,581 GRT
- Length: 345.5 ft (105.3 m)
- Beam: 46.3 ft (14.1 m)
- Height: 25.5 ft (7.8 m)

Ōmi Maru (近江丸) was the name of Japanese cargo ship owned by Nippon Yusen Kaisha (NYK), Tokyo. The name Ōmi Maru derives from Ōmi province.

== History ==
In 1912, Ōmi Maru entered NYK service along with vessels which were known as sister ships in the NYK fleet. In the early years of what became World War II, Ōmi Maru was commandeered by the Imperial Japanese Navy for use as a troopship. The ship was torpedoed and sunk south of the Caroline Islands by the submarine USS Triton on December 28, 1942.
