= Willis Lent =

US Navy admiral (1904–1959)

Willis A. Lent
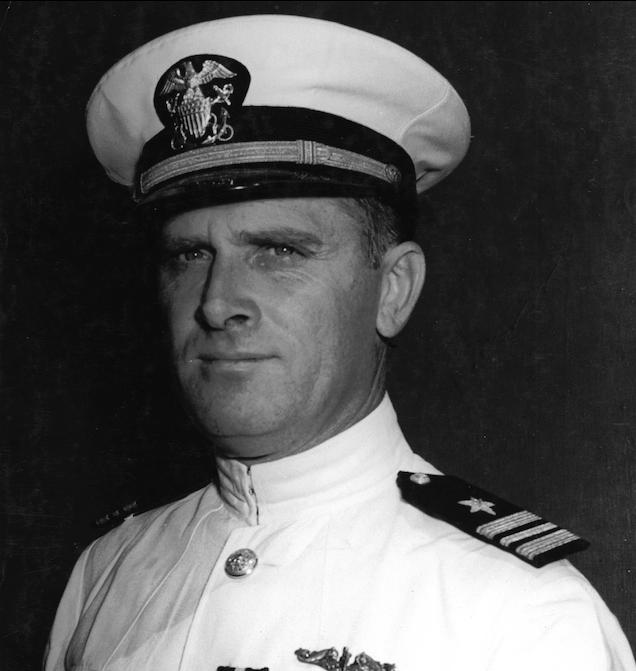
- Born: January 5, 1904; West Roxbury, Massachusetts
- Died: August 28, 1959; New London, Connecticut
- Military career
- Allegiance: United States
- Branch: United States Navy
- Service years: 1925–1955
- Rank: Rear admiral
- Nickname: "Pilly"
- Commands: USS Triton (SS-201); USS Grenadier (SS-210)
- Conflicts: World War II
- Awards: Navy Cross (2); Legion of Merit
- Other work: Electric Boat Division; General Dynamics Corporation

Willis Ashford Lent (January 5, 1904 – August 28, 1959), nicknamed "Pilly", was a rear admiral in the United States Navy. Serving as commanding officer of the Tambor-class submarine USS Triton during the Second World War, Lent made the first torpedo attack against the Japanese of the war.

== Early life ==
Lent was born in West Roxbury, Massachusetts, and graduated from the United States Naval Academy in 1925. On August 15, 1940, he assumed command of Triton as she was commissioned.

== First patrol ==
Upon the outbreak of World War II, Lieutenant Commander Lent and Triton were assigned to Submarine Division 62. Triton made a training cruise to Midway from August 30 to September 15, then participated in local and fleet operations in the Hawaiian area. On November 19, Lent headed west to conduct a practice war patrol and arrived off Wake Island on November 26. On December 8, he saw columns of smoke rising over the island but assumed it was caused by construction work being done ashore. That night, when he surfaced to charge batteries, he was informed by radio Wake and Pearl Harbor had been bombed and was ordered to stay out of range of Wake's guns. The next morning, Lent observed the Japanese bombing the island. On the night of December 10, he was surfaced, charging batteries, when flashes of light from Wake revealed a destroyer or light cruiser on a parallel course. The submarine was silhouetted against the moon, and the enemy ship turned towards. Lent went deep and began evasive action.

When the Japanese ship slowed astern, Lent came to 120 feet (40 m) and fired four Mark XIV torpedoes – all his stern tubes, the first American submarine torpedo shots of World War II – on sonar bearings (in keeping with prewar doctrine). He heard a dull explosion 58 seconds later and believed one torpedo had hit, then went to 175 feet (50 m) and cleared the area. (No sinking was recorded, and Lent was not credited with one.) After their initial repulse on December 11, the Japanese returned with two aircraft carriers, Hiryū and Sōryū; thanks in part to the confusion at Pearl Harbor, Lent was not informed, and Triton made no attacks on them, so any chance to delay or prevent the invasion was lost, as was a chance (always exceedingly rare) of sinking or damaging a Japanese aircraft carrier. Neither did he make any effort to evacuate the 350 Marines. On December 21, he was ordered to return to Hawaii, arriving at Pearl Harbor on December 31.

== Second patrol ==
Lent was sent by Admiral Withers, COMSUBPAC, to the East China Sea in January 1942, where he met filthy winter weather patrolling between Nagasaki, Shanghai, Dairen, and Korea. Lent made fourteen contacts, firing twelve torpedoes, earning credit for sinking two ships totalling 12,000 tons (reduced to 5982 tons JANAC postwar) Withers was praiseful, but nitpicked Lent's "squandering" torpedoes because production from Newport Torpedo Station was running drastically behind use. He also criticised Lent's failure to follow up attacks and undue caution around Japanese aircraft. This was following prewar doctrine, however.

== Third patrol ==
After his return, Lent was transferred to command of the Tambor-class submarine USS Grenadier, departing for the East China Sea in April 1942. He found a convoy of seven ships, including the "magnificent passenger freighter" Taiyo Maru (14,500 tons) (built in Germany in 1911 as the Cap Finisterre). Lent fired four torpedoes, two for influence, two for contact; the influence feature failed to function, but the other two sank Taiyo Maru, sending over a thousand oil field technicians with her. Lent then went to 250 feet (76 m), where he suffered 36 depth charges over the next four hours, so he did not observe the sinking, and on his return to Pearl Harbor, joined the chorus of complaints about the Mark XIV torpedo and its Mark VI exploder. He was echoed by his division commander, Marmaduke O'Leary; Admiral English, COMSUBPAC (replacing Withers), "[s]tubbornly following the policy of his predecessors -and the Gun Club line", instead blamed his skippers and crews.

Lent's biggest opportunity was Shōkaku, which he was detailed to intercept in the Bungo Suido but he never sighted her.

== Battle of Midway ==
En route home, with the decryption of the Japanese plan to invade Midway, Lent was reassigned to the second of three submarine patrol lines defending the island. His was one of eighteen boats around the island, which (except for Nautilus) accomplished nothing of consequence during the battle. Operating south of Nautilus, Lent picked up an 06.15 contact report of a force already out of reach. At 08.37, he surfaced and headed for Midway in hope of intercepting Japanese in retreat, but was forced to dive by American aircraft (still likely to attack, as Grayling learned), and quickly surfaced again to continue.

== Subsequent wartime career ==
Lent went on to command the troubled HOR-engined Haddo with SubRon 12 in England (which made dozens of patrols but did no recorded damage) and then SubRon 16, relieving Tex McLean, who went to the Submarine School. Lent's wartime score totalled 20,482 tons.

== Postwar ==
In 1955, having been decorated with both two Navy Crosses and the Legion of Merit, Lent retired and under the tombstone promotion law was made rear admiral. He later worked with the Electric Boat Division of the General Dynamics Corporation.
