= USS Anthedon =

Tender of the United States Navy

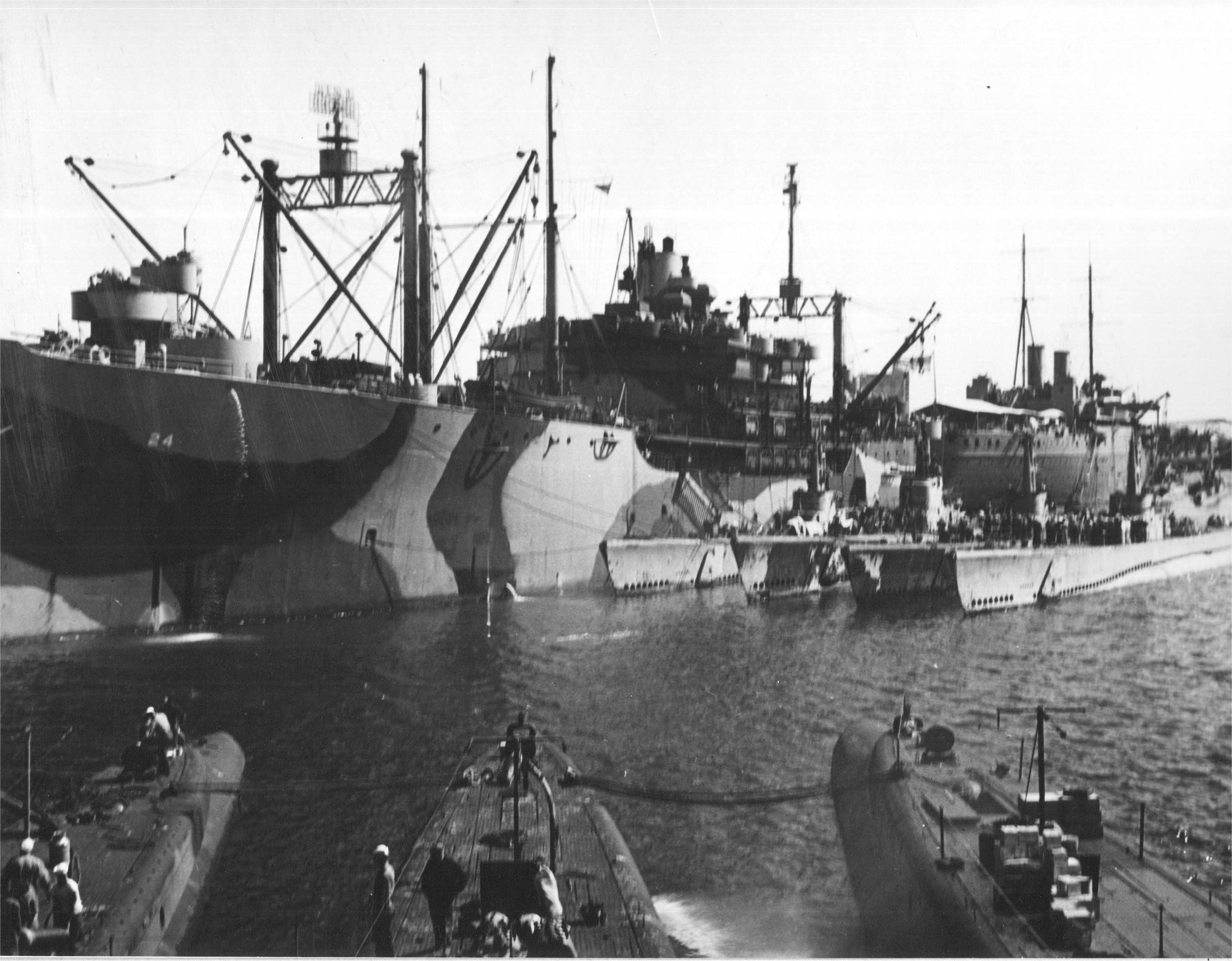
- USS Anthedon (AS-24,) moored pierside at the US Submarine Base, Fremantle, Australia, while refitting Pacific Fleet submarines, 26 January 1945.

History

United States
- Name: Anthedon
- Namesake: Anthedon
- Ordered: as type (C3-S-A2) hull, MC hull 858
- Builder: Ingalls Shipbuilding, Pascagoula, Mississippi
- Laid down: 6 May 1943
- Launched: 15 October 1943
- Commissioned: 17 December 1943 (reduced commission)
- Decommissioned: 30 December 1943
- Commissioned: 15 September 1944 (full commission)
- Decommissioned: 21 September 1946
- Stricken: c.1968–1969
- Identification: Hull symbol: AS-24; Code letters: NUSP
- Fate: Sold to Turkey, 7 February 1969

Turkey
- Name: Donatan
- Acquired: 7 February 1969
- Identification: A-583
- Fate: Scrapped, date unknown

General characteristics
- Class & type: Aegir-class submarine tender
- Displacement: 16,500 long tons (16,800 t) (full)
- Length: 492 ft 6 in (150.11 m)
- Beam: 69 ft 6 in (21.18 m)
- Draft: 27 ft (8.2 m)
- Installed power: 2 × Foster–Wheeler D-type 465 psi (3,210 kPa) 765 °F (407 °C) steam boilers; 8,500 shp (6,300 kW)
- Propulsion: 1 × General Electric steam turbine; General Electric double reduction main gears; 1 × Propeller
- Speed: 18.4 kn (34.1 km/h; 21.2 mph)
- Complement: 82 Officers 1,378 Enlisted
- Armament: 1 × 5 in (127 mm)/38 caliber dual-purpose gun; 4 × single 3 in (76 mm)/50 cal guns; 2 × twin 40 mm (1.6 in) Bofors anti-aircraft (AA) mounts; 20 × 20 mm (0.8 in) Oerlikon cannons AA

USS Anthedon (AS-24) was an Aegir-class submarine tender of the United States Navy during World War II.

== Construction ==
The ship was laid down on 6 May 1943 under a Maritime Commission, type (C3-S-A2) hull, under contract (MC hull 858) at Pascagoula, Mississippi, by the Ingalls Shipbuilding Company. It was launched on 15 October 1943, and sponsored by Mrs. William M. Colmer. The ship was acquired by the US Navy and commissioned on 17 December 1943. It was turned over to the Todd Shipbuilding Co. for conversion and decommissioned on 30 December 1943, and then recommissioned on 15 September 1944, with Navy Cross recipient Commander Richard E. Hawes in command.

== Service history ==
=== Pacific, 1944–1945 ===
Following her commissioning, the submarine tender got underway for Brooklyn, New York, to load provisions and ammunition at the New York Navy Yard and then traveled to New London, Connecticut, to take on spare parts for submarines and to conduct tests and drills. She departed New London on 11 October and set a course for Australia. The ship transited the Panama Canal on 17 October and arrived at Fremantle submarine base in Western Australia on 17 November.

Anthedon spent three months at that port carrying out refits and voyage repairs on submarines returning from war patrols. The tender departed Fremantle on 12 February 1945; and made stops at Brisbane, Australia, and Hollandia, New Guinea, to pick up building material. She reached Subic Bay, Philippines, on 13 March, and remained there during the rest of the war, servicing numerous submarines as well as the destroyer escorts operating from Subic Bay.

After Japan capitulated in mid-August, the submarine tender got underway on the 31st to return to Fremantle. She reached that port on 10 September and assisted in the dismantling of the submarine repair unit located there. Anthedon departed Fremantle on 2 October to return to the Philippines; arrived at Subic Bay on 14 October; and began providing repair services to submarines.

=== Return to the US, 1945 ===
On 1 November, Anthedon weighed anchor to return, via the Hawaiian Islands and the Panama Canal, to New London. She transited the canal on 20 November and reached Norfolk, Virginia, on 5 December. After discharging passengers and cargo, the tender continued on to New London. She spent one week there before moving to Bayonne, New Jersey on 15 December to enter drydock for the repair of a crack in her hull. Anthedon was back in New London on 22 December.

=== Deactivation and sale, 1946–1969 ===
During January and February 1946, the tender assisted submarines preparing for deactivation. On 1 March, Anthedon commenced deactivation herself, and she was placed out of commission, in reserve, at New London on 21 September 1946. Her name was struck from the Navy List sometime in late 1968 or early 1969. She was sold to Turkey on 7 February 1969 and served the Turkish Navy as TCG Donatan (A-583).

== Notes ==
Citations

== Bibliography ==
Online resources* "Anthedon (AS-23)". Dictionary of American Naval Fighting Ships. Naval History and Heritage Command. This article incorporates text from this source, which is in the public domain.
