= USS Grayling (SS-209) =

Submarine of the United States

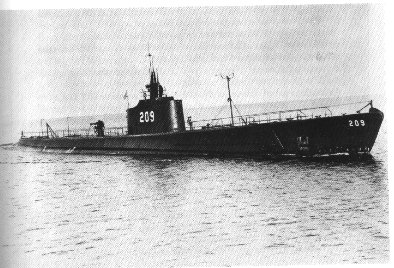
- USS Grayling (SS-209)

History

United States
- Builder: Portsmouth Naval Shipyard, Kittery, Maine
- Laid down: 15 December 1939
- Launched: 29 November 1940
- Commissioned: 1 March 1941
- Honors and awards: 6 × battle stars
- Fate: Lost off Manila around 9 September 1943

General characteristics
- Class & type: Tambor-class diesel-electric submarine
- Displacement: 1,475 long tons (1,499 t) standard, surfaced; 2,370 long tons (2,410 t) submerged
- Length: 307 ft 2 in (93.62 m)
- Beam: 27 ft 3 in (8.31 m)
- Draft: 14 ft 7 1/2 in (4.458 m)
- Propulsion: 4 × Fairbanks-Morse Model 38D8-⅛ 9-cylinder opposed piston diesel engines driving electrical generators; 2 × 126-cell Sargo batteries; 4 × high-speed General Electric electric motors with reduction gears; two propellers; 5,400 shp (4.0 MW) surfaced; 2,740 shp (2.0 MW) submerged
- Speed: 20.4 knots (38 km/h) surfaced; 8.75 knots (16 km/h) submerged
- Range: 11,000 nautical miles (20,000 km) at 10 knots (19 km/h)
- Endurance: 48 hours at 2 knots (3.7 km/h) submerged
- Test depth: 250 ft (76 m)
- Complement: 6 officers, 54 enlisted
- Armament: 10 × 21-inch (533 mm) torpedo tubes; 6 forward, 4 aft; 24 torpedoes; 1 × 3-inch (76 mm) / 50 caliber deck gun; Bofors 40 mm and Oerlikon 20 mm cannon

USS Grayling (SS-209) was the tenth Tambor-class submarine to be commissioned in the United States Navy in the years leading up to the country's December 1941 entry into World War II. She was the fourth ship of the United States Navy to be named for the grayling. Her wartime service was in the Pacific Ocean. She completed seven war patrols in the following 20 months, and is credited with the sinking of over 20,000 tons of Japanese merchant shipping and warships. Grayling received six battle stars for her World War II service. She was declared lost with all hands in September 1943. Her fate remains an unsolved mystery. Of the twelve Tambor-class submarines, only five survived the war.

== Construction and commissioning ==
Grayling′s keel was laid down at the Portsmouth Navy Yard in Kittery, Maine, on 15 December 1939. She was launched on 4 September 1940, sponsored by Mrs. Marion Barnes Bryant Leary, wife of Rear Admiral Herbert F. Leary, and commissioned on 1 March 1941.

== Pre-World War II ==
After conducting tests and sea trials, she was called upon 20 June 1941 to assist in the search for submarine O-9 (SS-70), which had failed to surface after a practice dive off Isles of Shoals. O-9 was subsequently discovered on the bottom, but rescue efforts failed; Grayling participated 22 June in the memorial services for those lost.

Joining the Atlantic Fleet, Grayling sailed on shakedown cruise on 4 August to Morehead City, North Carolina, and St. Thomas, U.S. Virgin Islands, returning to Portsmouth on 29 August. After final acceptance, she departed 17 November, armed at Newport, Rhode Island, and sailed for duty with the Pacific Fleet. Grayling transited the Panama Canal on 3 December and moored at San Diego, California, on 10 December.

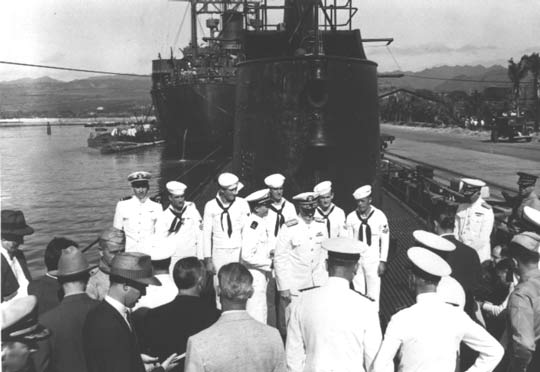
Admiral Chester Nimitz assumes command of the U.S. Pacific Fleet on 31 December 1941 on board Grayling (SS-209)

== Start of War, and Raising of Nimitz's Flag ==
Grayling sailed for Pearl Harbor on 17 December, arrived 24 December, and had the honor of being chosen for the Pacific Fleet change of command ceremony on 31 December 1941. The ceremony would normally have taken place on a battleship, but all the fleet's battleships had been either sunk or damaged during the Japanese Navy's attack three weeks earlier. On that day, Admiral Chester Nimitz hoisted his flag aboard Grayling as Commander, Pacific Fleet and began the United States Navy's long fighting road back to victory in the Pacific.

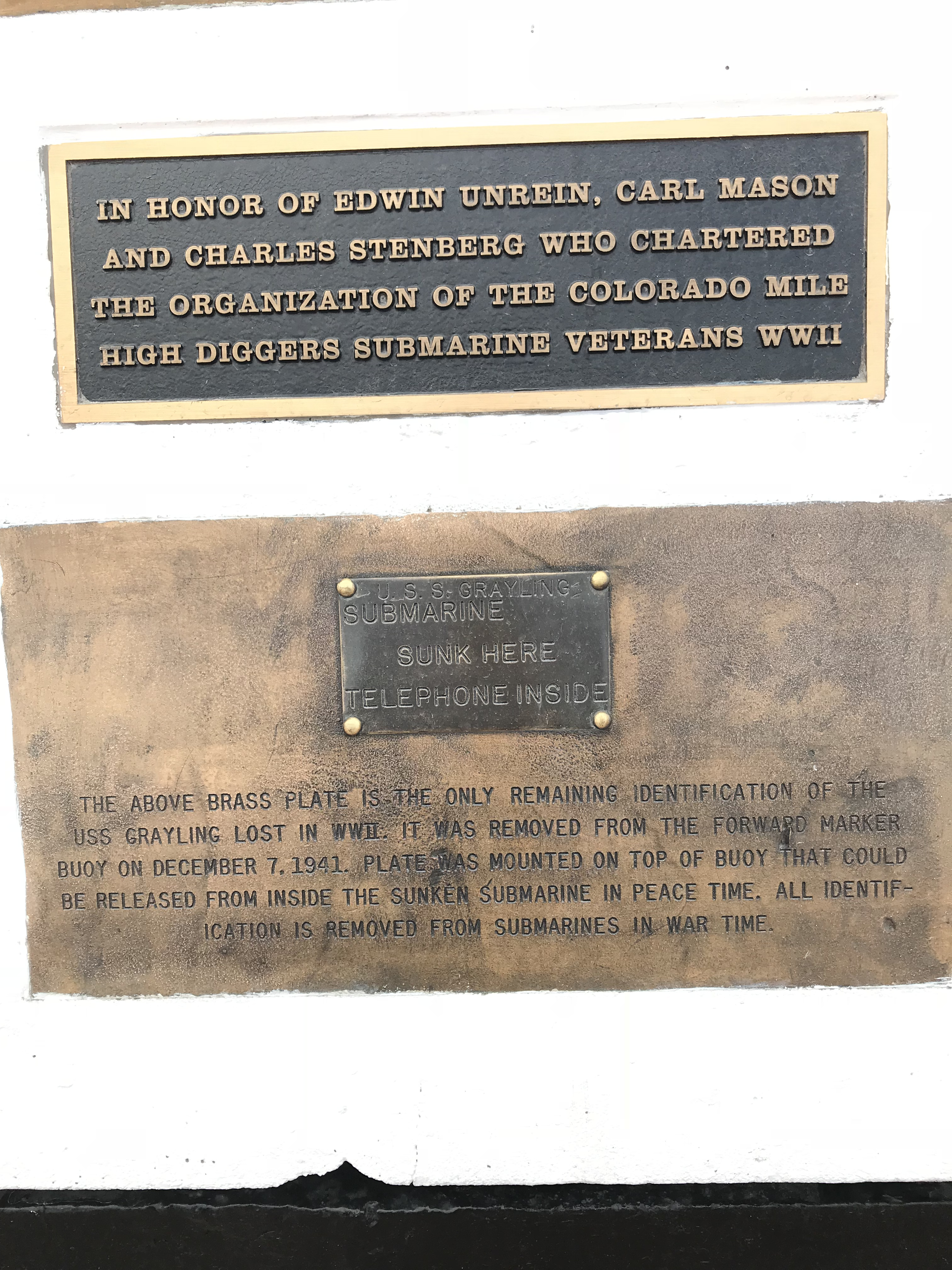
USS Grayling (SS-209) Memorial plaque

== COMSUBPAC Patrols, 1942 ==
After the ceremonies, Grayling stood out of Pearl Harbor on her first war patrol 5 January 1942. Cruising the Northern Gilbert Islands, Grayling failed to register a kill, but gained much in training and readiness, returning to Pearl Harbor on 7 March.

Her second patrol, beginning 27 March, was more successful. Cruising off the coast of Japan itself, Grayling sank her first ship 13 April, sending the cargo freighter Ryujin Maru to the bottom. She returned to Hawaii on 16 May.

Grayling returned to action in June as all available ships were pressed into service to oppose the Japanese advance on Midway Island. As part of Task Group 7.1, Grayling and her sister submarines were arranged in a fan-like reconnaissance deployment west of Midway Atoll in the Northwestern Hawaiian Islands, helping to provide knowledge of Japanese movements. During this deployment, 12 U.S. Army Air Forces B-17 Flying Fortress bombers sighted Grayling on 7 June 1942 while she was on the surface, and three of them mistakenly attacked her with a string of twenty 1,000-pound (454 kg) bombs dropped from an altitude of more than 10,000 feet (3,000 m), all of which missed. Grayling quickly crash-dived and avoided damage, but the B-17 crews claimed to have sunk a Japanese heavy cruiser in 15 seconds.

As U.S. Navy planners established a submarine blockade of Truk in connection with the U.S. offensive in the Solomon Islands, Grayling began her third war patrol on 14 July 1942 around the Japanese stronghold. She damaged a Japanese submarine tender on 13 August, but was forced to return to Pearl Harbor on 26 August by fuel leaks.

At Pearl Harbor, Grayling was repaired and was fitted with surface radar, after which she began her fourth patrol on 19 October 1942. Although attacked by gunfire and six separate depth charge runs by Japanese destroyers, Grayling succeeded on 10 November 1942 in sinking a 4,000-ton cargo ship southwest of Truk. She also destroyed a Japanese schooner on 4 December before putting into Fremantle submarine base, Western Australia, 13 December 1942.

== Deployment to Australia, 1943 ==
Changing her base of operations to Australia, Grayling stood out of Fremantle on 7 January 1943 on her fifth patrol, this time in Philippine waters. She sank cargo ship Ushio Maru west of Luzon on 26 January and damaged another Japanese ship the next day. After sinking a schooner on 24 February, Grayling returned to Fremantle.

Grayling left Australian waters on 26 March on her sixth war patrol and cruised in the Tarakan area and the Verde Island Passage. There, she attacked and sank cargo ship Shanghai Maru on 9 April and damaged four other ships before returning to Fremantle on 25 April.

Her seventh war patrol, commencing 18 May, took Grayling into the waters off northwest Borneo. While she en route to her patrol area, a PBY Catalina flying boat of U.S. Navy Patrol Squadron 101 (VP-101) mistakenly dropped a depth charge on her as she submerged in the Indian Ocean at 17°S 115°E. The depth charge did not explode. After reaching her patrol area, Grayling damaged a freighter and two smaller ships before returning to her base on 6 July 1943.

== Loss ==
Grayling began her eighth and final war patrol in July, 1943, from Fremantle. She made two visits to the coast of the Philippines, delivering supplies and equipment to guerrillas at Pucio Point, Pandan Bay, Panay, 31 July and 23 August 1943. Cruising in the Philippines area, Grayling recorded her last kill, the passenger-cargo Meizan Maru on 27 August in the Tablas Strait, but was not heard from again after 9 September. She was scheduled to make a radio report on 12 September, which she did not, and all attempts to contact her failed. Grayling was officially reported "lost with all hands" 30 September 1943.

On 27 August 1943, Japanese ships witnessed a torpedo attack, and the next day a surfaced submarine was seen, both in the Tablas Strait area, and then on 9 September a surfaced American submarine was seen inside Lingayen Gulf. All of these sightings correspond with Grayling's orders to patrol the approaches to Manila. On 9 September 1943, Japanese passenger-cargo vessel Hokuan Maru reported a submarine in shallow water west of Luzon. The ship made a run over the area and "noted an impact with a submerged object". No additional data are available.

Assuming she survived this incident, no other recorded Japanese attacks could have sunk Grayling. Her loss may have been operational or by an unrecorded attack. The only certainty, therefore, is that Grayling was lost between 9 September and 12 September 1943 either in Lingayen Gulf or along the approaches to Manila. ComTaskFor71 requested a transmission from Grayling on 12 September, but did not receive one.

Grayling was credited with five major kills, totaling 20,575 tons. All but the first of Grayling's eight war patrols were declared "successful".

== Honors and awards ==
Grayling received six battle stars for her World War II service.

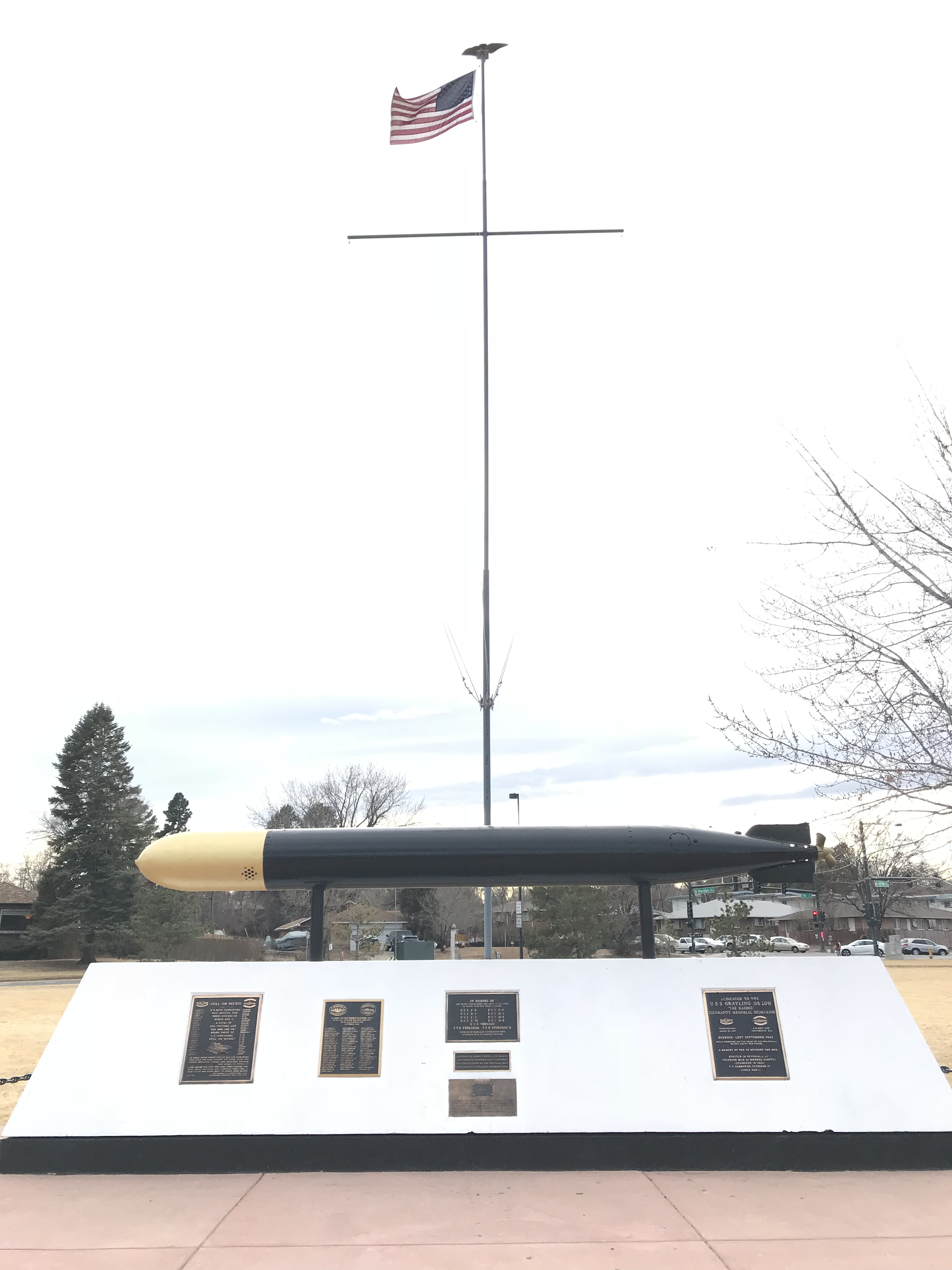
USS Grayling (SS-209) Memorial
