= USS Grenadier (SS-210) =

Submarine of the United States

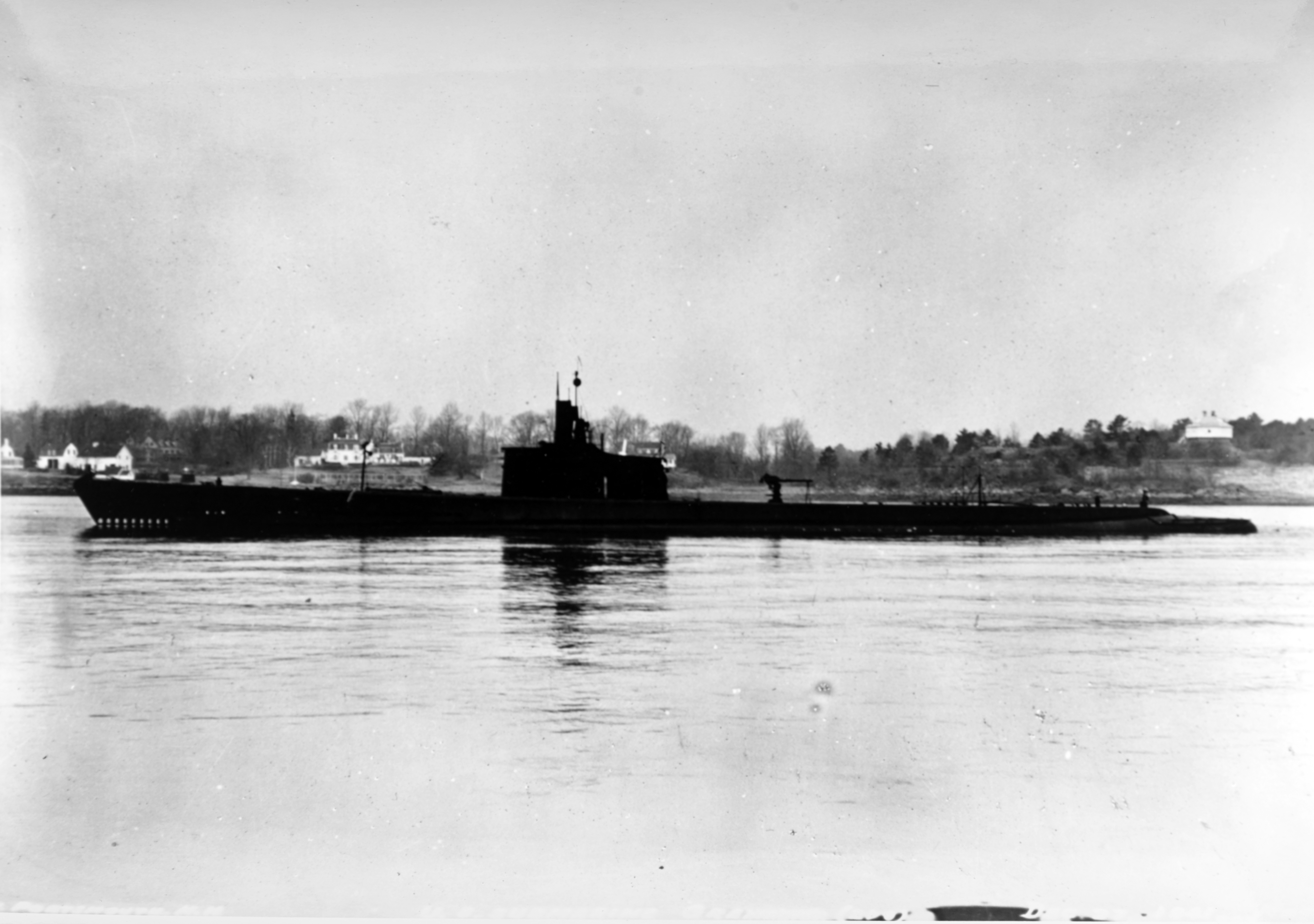
- USS Grenadier off Portsmouth, New Hampshire

History

United States
- Builder: Portsmouth Naval Shipyard, Kittery, Maine
- Laid down: 2 April 1940
- Launched: 29 November 1940
- Commissioned: 1 May 1941
- Honors and awards: 4 × battle stars
- Fate: Scuttled off Phuket, 22 April 1943, after being damaged by Japanese aircraft

General characteristics
- Class & type: Tambor class diesel-electric submarine
- Displacement: 1,475 long tons (1,499 t) standard, surfaced; 2,370 long tons (2,410 t) submerged
- Length: 307 ft 2 in (93.62 m)
- Beam: 27 ft 3 in (8.31 m)
- Draft: 14 ft 7 1/2 in (4.458 m)
- Propulsion: 4 × Fairbanks-Morse Model 38D8-⅛ 9-cylinder opposed piston diesel engines driving electrical generators; 2 × 126-cell Sargo batteries; 4 × high-speed General Electric electric motors with reduction gears; two propellers; 5,400 shp (4.0 MW) surfaced; 2,740 shp (2.0 MW) submerged
- Speed: 20.4 knots (38 km/h) surfaced; 8.75 knots (16 km/h) submerged
- Range: 11,000 nautical miles (20,000 km) at 10 knots (19 km/h)
- Endurance: 48 hours at 2 knots (3.7 km/h) submerged
- Test depth: 250 ft (76 m)
- Complement: 6 officers, 54 enlisted
- Armament: 10 × 21-inch (533 mm) torpedo tubes; 6 forward, 4 aft; 24 torpedoes; 1 × 3-inch (76 mm) / 50 caliber deck gun; Bofors 40 mm and Oerlikon 20 mm cannon

USS Grenadier (SS-210), a Tambor-class submarine, was the first ship of the United States Navy to be named for the grenadier fish, relatives of cod that are very common in bathyal and abyssal habitats.

== Construction and commissioning ==
Grenadier′s keel was laid down by Portsmouth Navy Yard in Kittery, Maine, in April 1940. She was launched on 29 November 1940, sponsored by Mrs. Virginia E. Anderson, wife of Rear Admiral Walter S. Anderson, Director of Naval Intelligence. Grenadier was commissioned on 1 May 1941 with Lieutenant Commander Allen R. Joyce in command.

== Pre-World War II service ==
On 20 June 1941 Grenadier participated in the search for USS O-9, which had failed to surface after a deep test dive, and was present two days later as memorial exercises were conducted over the spot where O-9 and her crew lay. After shakedown in the Caribbean Sea, Grenadier returned to Portsmouth on 5 November for refit. Less than three weeks after the Japanese attack on Pearl Harbor, she sailed for the Pacific to join the submarine fleet.

== COMSUBPAC patrols, 1942 ==
Grenadier's first war patrol from 4 February to 23 March 1942 took her near the Japanese home islands, off the coast of Honshū, and brought her several targets but no sinkings. On 12 April Grenadier, now under command of Lieutenant Commander Willis Lent, departed Pearl Harbor for her second war patrol, along the Shanghai-Yokohama and Nagasaki-Formosa shipping lanes. On 8 May she torpedoed and sank one of her most important victories of the war, transport Taiyō Maru. Post-war examination of Japanese records showed Taiyō Maru to be more than just the ordinary transport; she was en route to the East Indies with a group of Japanese scientists, economists, and industrial experts, including renowned hydraulic engineer Yoichi Hatta who designed Chianan Irrigation and built Wusanto Reservoir in Taiwan, bent on expediting the exploitation of the conquered territory. Their loss was a notable blow to the Japanese war effort.

On 1 May 1942, Grenadier mistakenly sank the Soviet merchant ship Angarstroi in the East China Sea about 90 nautical miles (170 km; 100 mi) west-southwest of Nagasaki, Japan.

On 25 May 1942, Grenadier was diverted from her patrol area to Midway Atoll in the Northwestern Hawaiian Islands, where she formed part of the submarine patrol line as the American fleet in a bloody but brilliant battle handed the Imperial Navy its first defeat in some three hundred years. Grenadier's third war patrol was in the Truk area, heavily patrolled by enemy ships and planes. Although she sighted some 28 Japanese ships, enemy planes effectively hampered her, and she returned to her new base, Fremantle, Australia, empty-handed.

== Deployment to Australia ==
The Malay Barrier was the site of Grenadier's fourth war patrol from 13 October to 10 December. After laying a minefield off Haiphong, Indochina, the submarine made an unsuccessful attack on a large freighter. During the severe depth charging which followed, sea water seeped into the batteries; Grenadier's crew suffered headaches and nausea from chlorine gas poisoning for the remainder of the patrol. On 12 November, she attacked and sank by torpedo the rescue tug Hokkai Maru (457 GRT) off the coast of French Indochina at 11°18′N 109°02′E. To increase the misery, on 20 November Grenadier spotted a Ryūjō-class aircraft carrier, escorted by a cruiser and a destroyer, heading through the Strait of Makassar too distant to shoot. Grenadier surfaced to radio the aircraft carrier's location and course to Fremantle submarine base in hope that another submarine could capitalize on it.

Grenadier's fifth war patrol, under the command of Lieutenant Commander John Allison Fitzgerald, between 1 January and 20 February 1943, brought her considerably better fortune than earlier patrols. A 75-ton schooner fell victim to Grenadier's deck guns 10 January, and two days later Grenadier sighted a small tanker with a barge in tow. Judging the target not worth a torpedo, she slipped silently into the column behind the two Japanese ships. At dusk she battle surfaced. With binoculars lashed to the deck guns as sights, she raked the tanker and barge, sinking them immediately. The remainder of her patrol, along the Borneo coast through shallow and treacherous waters, was hampered by fathometer failures. She conducted an aggressive attack on two cargo ships 22 January but did not sink them.

The submarine departed Australia on 20 March on her last war patrol and headed for the Strait of Malacca, gateway between the Pacific and Indian Oceans. Patrolling along the Malay and Thai coasts, Grenadier claimed a small freighter off the island of Phuket on 6 April.

== Loss ==
Grenadier remained in the area and late on the night of 20 April 1943 sighted two merchant ships and closed in for the attack. Running on the surface at dawn on 21 April, Grenadier spotted, and was simultaneously spotted by, a Japanese airplane. The submarine dived, and as she passed 130 feet (40 m) her executive officer commented, "We ought to be safe now." Just then, explosions rocked Grenadier and heeled her over 15 to 20 degrees. Power and lights failed completely and the fatally wounded ship settled to the bottom at 270 feet (82 m). She tried to make repairs while a fierce fire blazed in the maneuvering room.

After 13 hours of sweating it out on the bottom, Grenadier managed to surface after dark to clear the submarine of smoke and inspect damage. The damage to her propulsion system was irreparable. Attempting to bring his ship closer to shore so that the crew could scuttle her and escape into the jungle, Fitzgerald even tried to jury-rig a sail. But the long night's work proved futile. As dawn broke on 22 April, Grenadier's weary crew sighted two Japanese ships heading for them. One, the netlayer Choko Maru, began ineffective shelling. Fitzgerald "didn't think it advisable to make a stationary dive in 280 feet (85 m) of water without power," and the crew began burning confidential documents prior to abandoning ship. A Japanese airplane attacked the stricken submarine, but Grenadier, although dead in the water and to all appearances helpless, blazed away with her machine guns. She hit the plane on its second pass. As the damaged plane veered off, its torpedo landed about 200 yards (180 m) from the boat and exploded. Opening all vents, the crew of Grenadier abandoned ship and watched her sink to her final resting place. Choko Maru picked up eight officers and 68 enlisted men and took them to Penang, Malay States, where they were questioned, beaten, and starved before being sent to other prison camps. They were then separated and transferred from camp to camp along the Malay Peninsula and finally to Japan. Throughout the war they suffered brutal, inhumane treatment, and their refusal to reveal military information frustrated and angered their captors. The first word that any of Grenadier′s crew had survived her sinking reached Australia on 27 November 1943. Despite their brutal and sadistic treatment, all but four of Grenadier's crew survived their two years in Japanese hands.

== Honors and awards ==
Grenadier received four battle stars for World War II service.

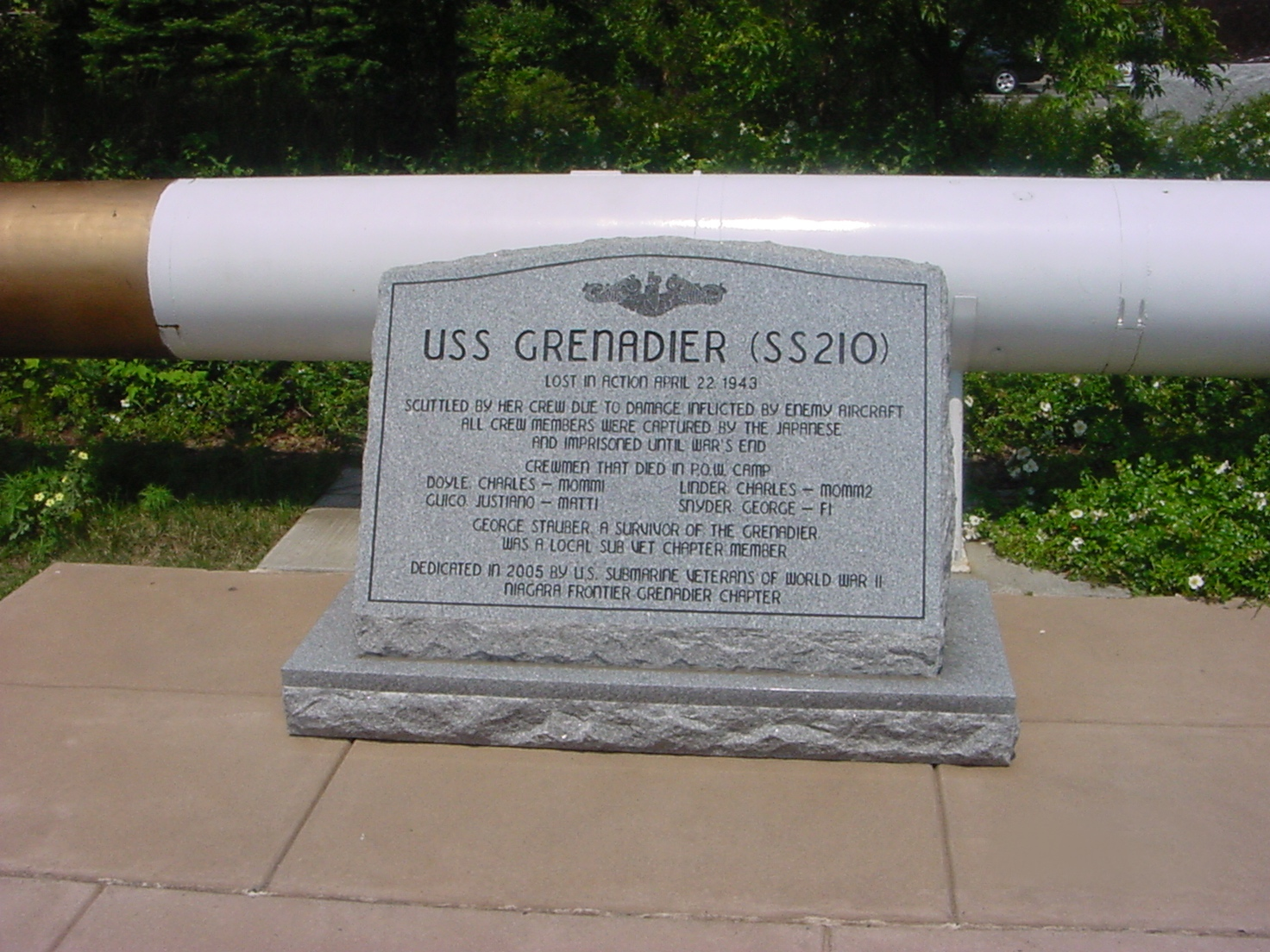
Memorial to USS Grenadier at the Buffalo and Erie County Naval & Military Park in Buffalo, New York

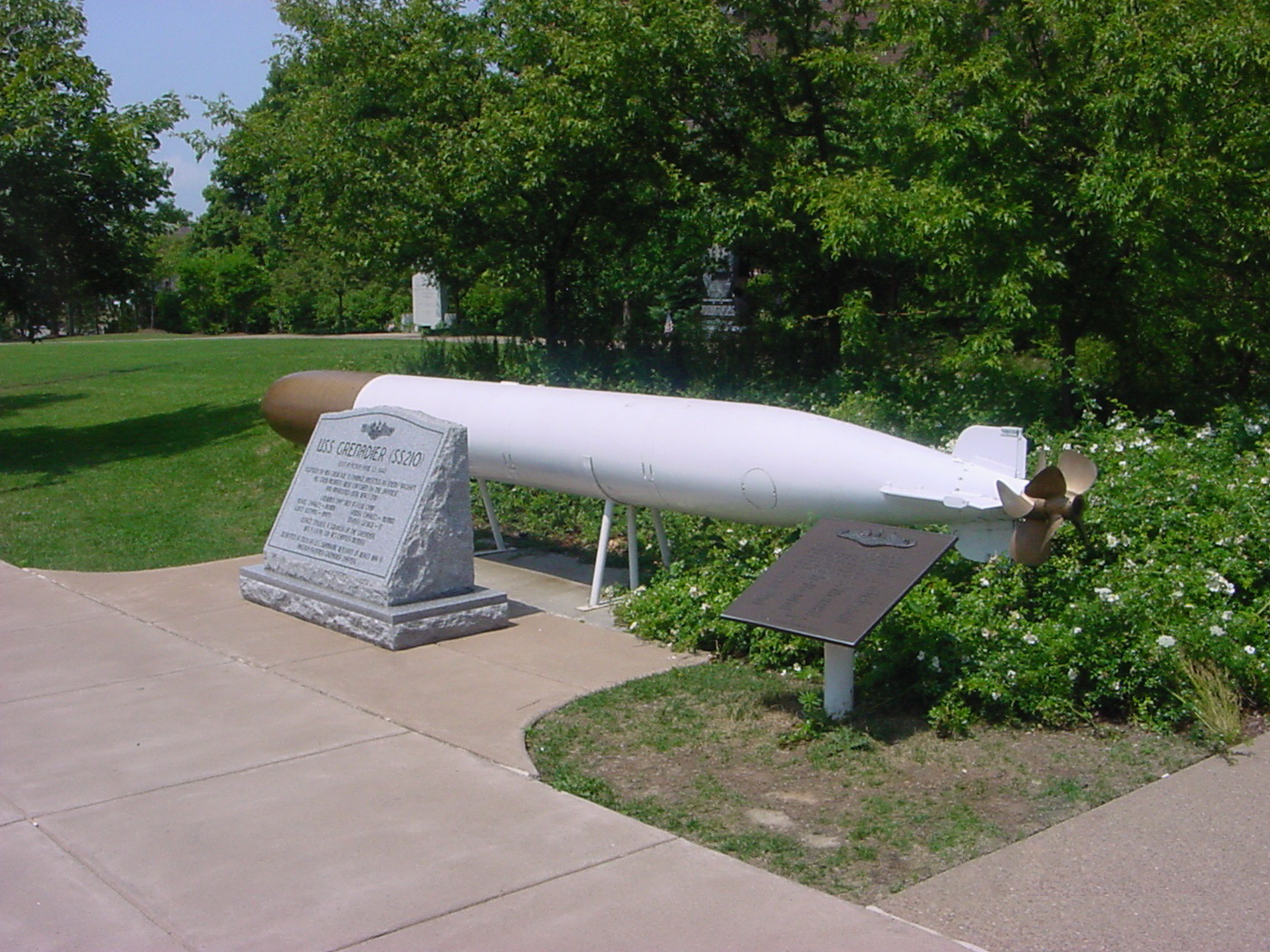

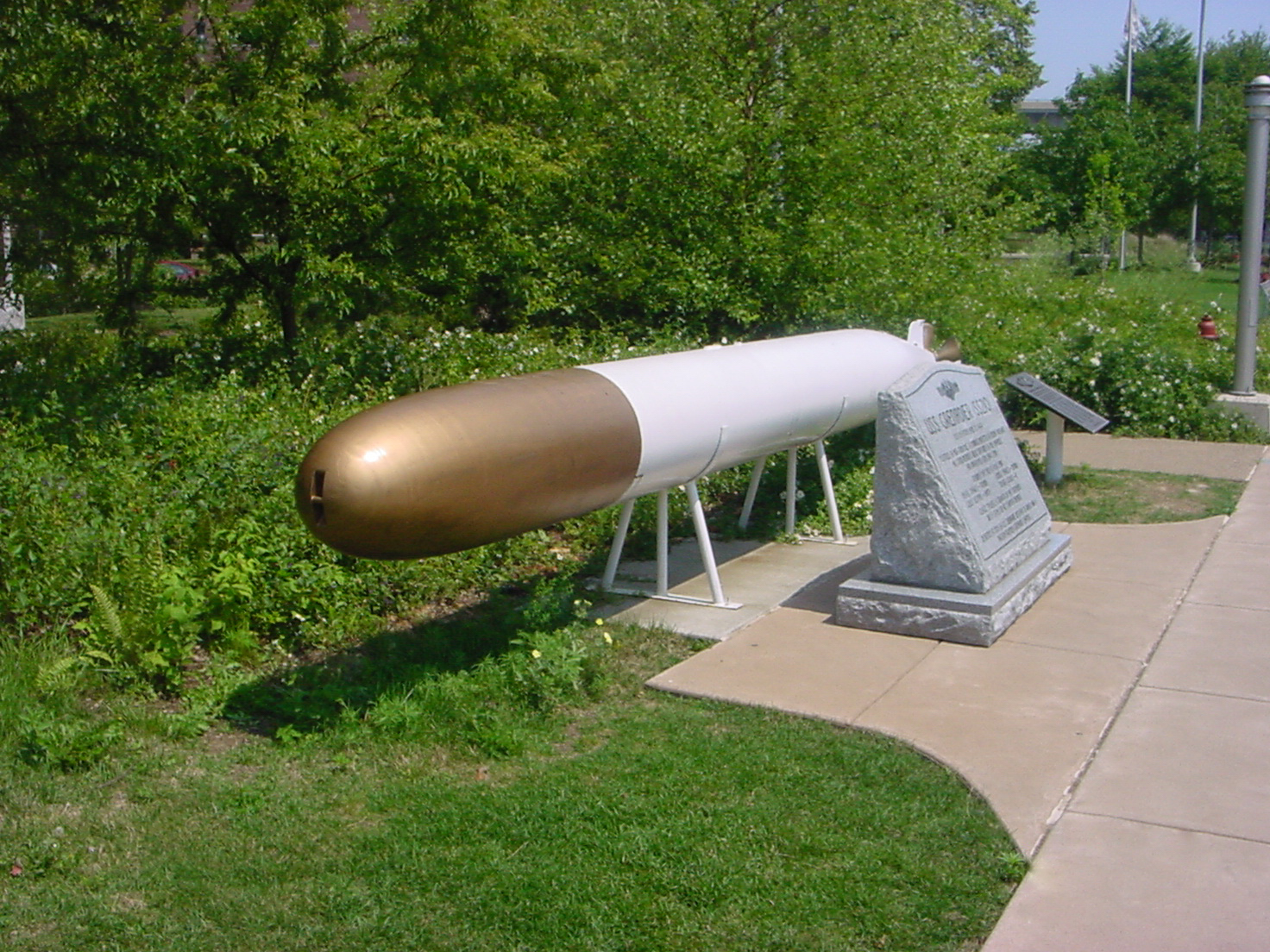

== Discovery of wreck ==
A sunken wreck identified as the Grenadier was found by a team of four divers—Jean Luc Rivoire, Lance Horowitz, Benoit Laborie and Ben Reymenants—sitting upright under about 260 feet (79 m) of water and partly covered in fishing nets. Announced in 2020, the discovery of the wreck came in a series of dives as part of a six-month, $110,000 expedition beginning in October 2019. The divers sent their findings to the Naval History and Heritage Command for verification; confirmation will place the wreck under the protections of the Sunken Military Craft Act.
