= Shōkai Maru-class tugboat =

Class overview
- Name: Shōkai Maru class
- Builders: Ōsaka Iron Works, Sakurajima Factory
- Operators: Imperial Japanese Army; Japanese National Railways; Japan Maritime Safety Agency
- Preceded by: Wajima Maru class
- Succeeded by: Hokkai Maru class
- Built: ?–1939
- In commission: 1938–1951
- Planned: 2
- Completed: 2
- Lost: ?
- Retired: 1 (?)

General characteristics
- Type: High-powered tugboat (gunboat)
- Displacement: 175 long tons (178 t) gross
- Length: 41.2 m (135 ft 2 in) o/a
- Beam: 6.0 m (19 ft 8 in)
- Draft: 2.8 m (9 ft 2 in)
- Propulsion: 2 × diesels, 700 bhp
- Speed: 14 knots (16 mph; 26 km/h)
- Armament: unknown

The Shōkai Maru-class high-powered tugboat (照海丸型強力曳船,, Shōkai Maru-gata kyōryoku eisen) was a class of gunboat of the Imperial Japanese Army, serving during World War II. The IJA official designation was high-powered tugboat, however, they did not have any towing facilities. They were actually gunboat and escort ships. Many records were lost after the Surrender of Japan.

== Ships in class ==
=== Shōkai Maru (照海丸) ===
- 20 April 1938; completed at Ōsaka Iron Works, Sakurajima Factory.
- Hereafter, her record was not left to documents.

=== Eikai Maru (映海丸) ===
- 27 February 1939; completed at Ōsaka Iron Works, Sakurajima Factory.
- 20 to 26 October 1944; escort operation for Harukaze Convoy (Manila - Kaohsiung).
- 22 to 27 November 1944; escort operation for TaKa-206 Convoy (Keelung - Naha).
- Survived war in Kushigahama; later rebuilt as short-range passenger at Mitsubishi Heavy Industries, Hiroshima shipyard.
- 1 May 1946; transferred to Japanese National Railways (later converted to training ship).
- 1 September 1948; transferred to Japan Maritime Safety Agency as patrol boat (PB-31, later PS-31).
- 23 June 1951; retired.

== Bibliography ==
- Monthly Ships of the World, "Kaijinsha"., (Japan)
  - No. 506, February 1996
  - No. 613, Special issue "All ships of Japan Coast Guard 1948–2003", July 2003
- Shinshichirō Komamiya, The Wartime Convoy Histories, "Shuppan Kyōdōsha". Archived from the original on 2011-07-22. (Japan), October 1987
- Tatsuo Furukawa, Wake of train ferry 100-year (2nd issue), "Seizando-Shoten". Archived from the original on 2009-04-17. (Japan), June 2001, ISBN 4-425-92141-0
- 100 year History of Hitachi Zōsen, Hitachi Zōsen Corporation, March 1985
- Policy and Legal Affairs Division-Japan Maritime Safety Agency (JMSA), 30 year History of Japan Maritime Safety Agency, Japan Maritime Safety Agency, May 1979
