= James Fife Jr. =

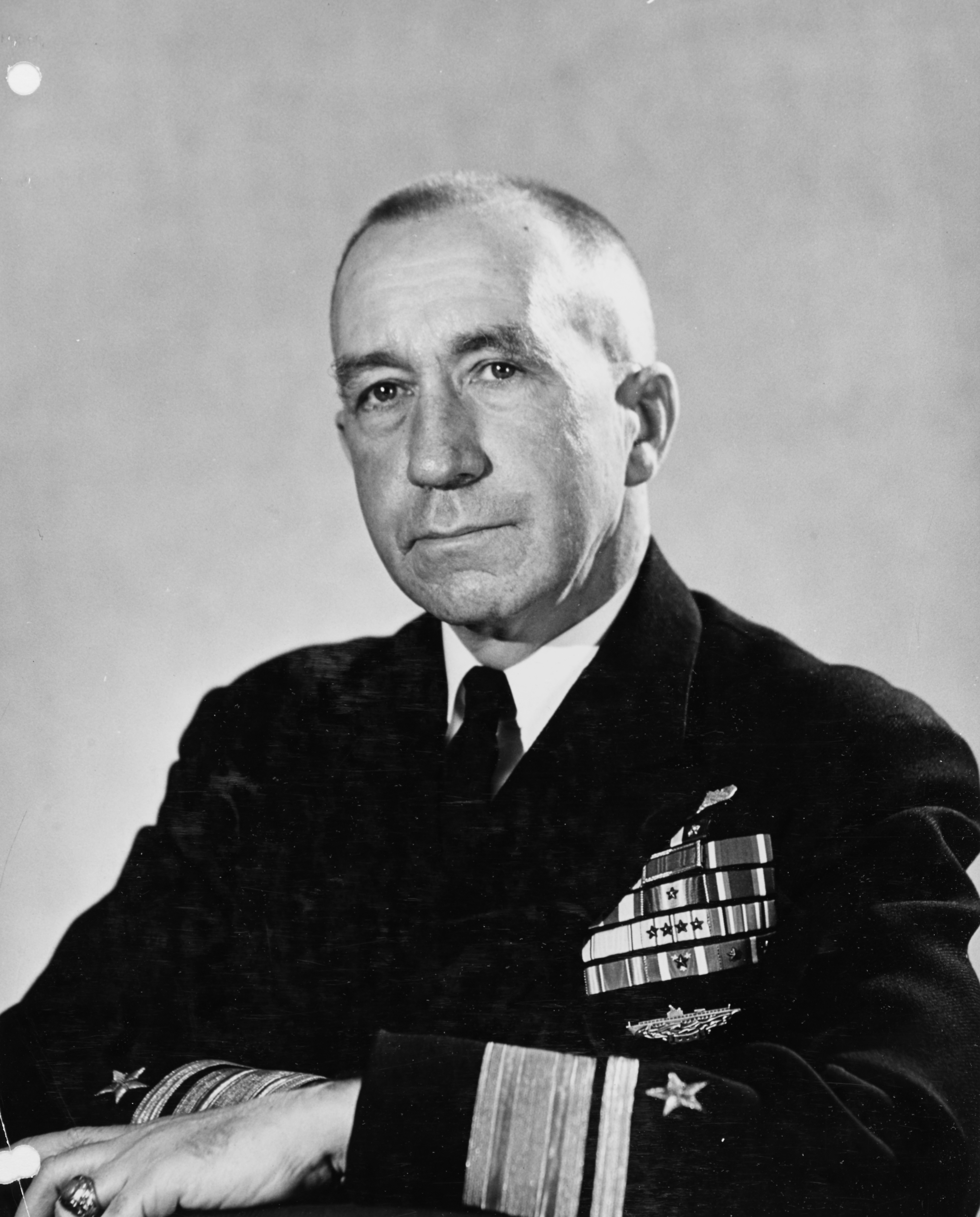
- Born: January 22, 1897; Reno, Nevada, US
- Died: November 1, 1975 (aged 78); Stonington, Connecticut, US
- Burial place: Arlington National Cemetery
- Alma mater: United States Naval Academy
- Military career
- Allegiance: United States of America
- Branch: United States Navy
- Service years: 1918–1955
- Rank: Admiral
- Conflicts: World War I; World War II; Pacific War; Buna campaign
- Awards: See Awards
- Other work: Director, Mystic Seaport

Admiral James Fife Jr. (January 22, 1897 – November 1, 1975) was a United States Navy admiral who was promoted to four-star rank after retirement as a "tombstone admiral".

== Biography ==
Fife graduated from the United States Naval Academy in 1918 and served in both World War I and World War II in submarines and surface combatants.

Prior to the Second World War, he served aboard USS S-3 (SS-107) and USS R-22 (SS-99), and was commanding officer of USS N-7 (SS-59), USS R-19 (SS-96) and USS R-18 (SS-95). In addition to his service on submarines, he also served on the battleship USS Idaho (BB-24) and the destroyers USS Leary (DD-158) and USS Hatfield (DD-231) from 1923 until May 1935.

When the U. S. entered World War II, Admiral Fife was Chief of Staff of Submarine Squadron 20 in the Philippines (part of the Asiatic Fleet under Admiral T. C. Hart). After the squadron was dissolved into Submarines, Asiatic Fleet, he served as Chief of Staff to Admiral Hart until May 1942. About this time he and Captain J. E. Wilkes, his former squadron commander, were instrumental in identifying several deficiencies of the submarine force, especially the difficulties with the Mark 14 torpedo and the Hooven-Owens-Rentschler diesel engine. Fife would later conduct some of the experiments that isolated the Mark 14 torpedo's defective components in cooperation with Rear Admiral Charles A. Lockwood, then Commander, Submarines, Southwest Pacific.

In late 1942 he served with General MacArthur as the representative of Admiral A. S. Carpender during the Buna campaign. Following this he commanded the submarines of Task Force 42 (later Task Force 72) in Brisbane, Australia, where he meticulously planned and directed his submarines' missions. In 1944 Admiral Fife transferred to the staff of Commander in Chief, U.S. Fleet (COMINCH) Admiral Ernest J. King in Washington, D.C. as a war planner.

Admiral Fife was awarded the Navy Distinguished Service Medal for meritorious service as the Chief of Staff to Commander Submarines, Asiatic Fleet, the Air Medal (by the Army), and a Gold Star in lieu of a second Distinguished Service Medal for action in the Pacific area.

At the close of 1944 he returned to Australia as Commander, Submarines, Seventh Fleet; Commander, U.S. Naval Forces, Fremantle, Western Australia; and Commander Task Force 71. As a result, he was awarded a Gold Star in lieu of a third Distinguished Service Medal.

As commander of Allied submarines in the South-West Pacific Area (Task Force 71), forces under his command were unable to stop the Japanese battleships Ise and Hyūga (Operation Kita 10–20 February 1945 ) from successfully reaching Japan with critically needed strategic war supplies. He had stationed 15 submarines along their expected route. Both Japanese ships were among the last Imperial Navy ships to safely reach the Japanese Home Islands.

From April 1947 until 1950, he commanded the Submarine Force, Atlantic Fleet (COMSUBLANT). This assignment was followed by duty as Assistant Chief, and Deputy Chief of Naval Operations (Operations). His final assignment before retirement was as U. S. Naval Commander in Chief, Mediterranean, under Admiral Mountbatten, Royal Navy. Fife retired from the Navy in August 1955, and was promoted upon retirement to full admiral.

In retirement he served as the Director of Mystic Seaport museum in Stonington, Connecticut. During his tenure at Mystic Seaport he oversaw a great expansion of the museum's exhibits and the refloating of the historic whaling ship Charles W. Morgan.

He died in 1975 and was buried in Arlington National Cemetery.

== Legacy ==
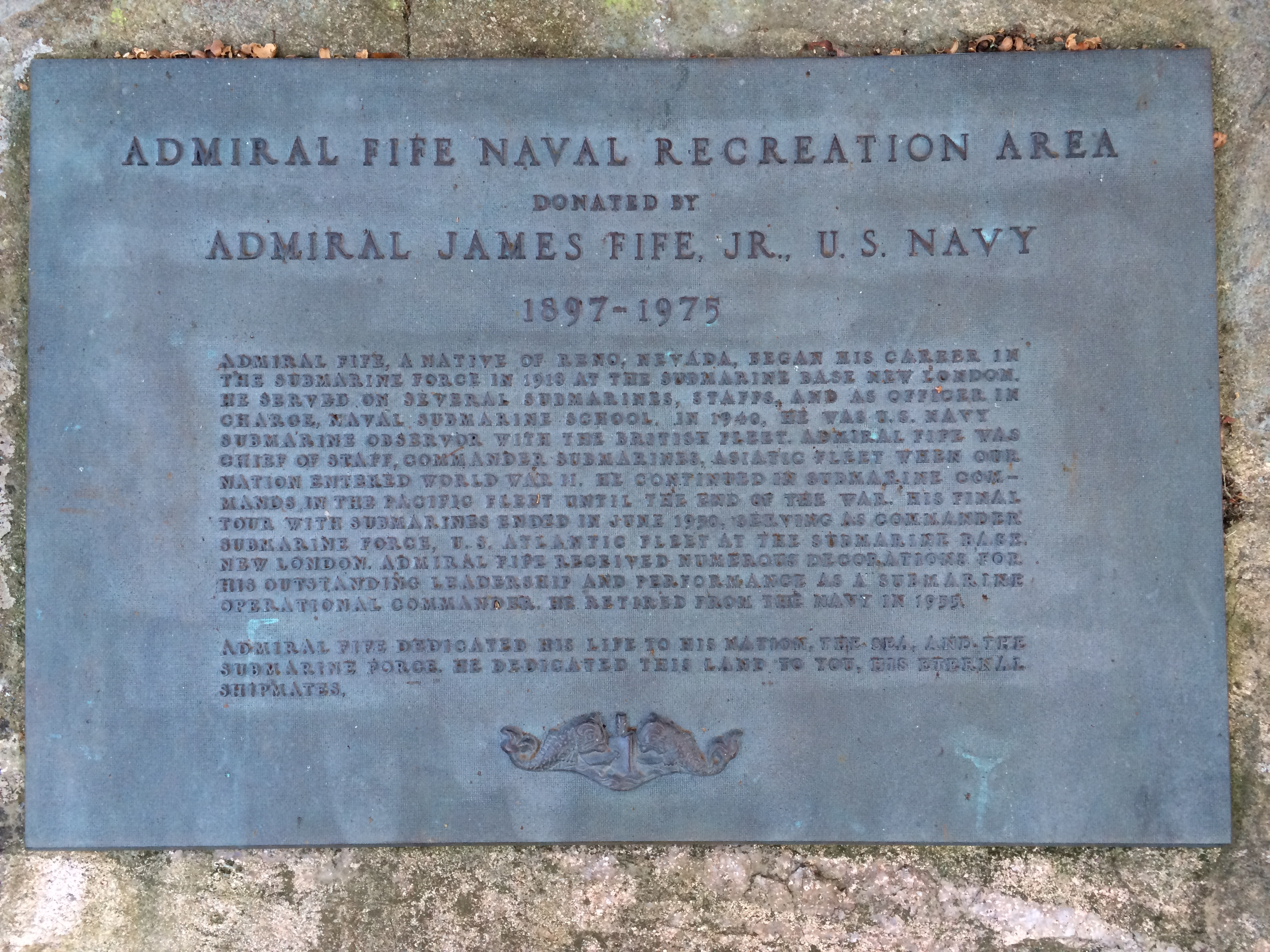
James Fife Jr. commemorative plaque

Fife bequeathed his estate in Stonington to the U.S. Navy, which turned it into a recreational area. The park is located at 571 Stonington Road (U.S. Route 1). A commemorative plaque is located on the property.

Fife Hall, a navigation training facility at Naval Submarine Base New London is named in his honor.

The USS Fife (DD-991), commissioned 31 May 1980 and decommissioned in 2003, was named in his honor.

== Bibliography ==
- Blair, Clay (2001). Silent Victory: The U.S. Submarine War Against Japan. Annapolis, Maryland: Naval Institute Press. ISBN 978-1-55750-217-9.

== Awards ==
- Distinguished Service Medal with two gold stars
- Air Medal
- Yangtze Service Medal
- Victory Medal
- American Campaign Medal
- Asiatic-Pacific Campaign Medal
- World War Two Victory Medal
- American Defense Service Medal
