= Husband E. Kimmel =

United States Navy admiral (1882–1968)

- Admiral Husband E. Kimmel in 1939
- Born: Husband Edward Kimmel; February 26, 1882; Henderson, Kentucky, U.S.
- Died: May 14, 1968 (aged 86); Groton, Connecticut, U.S.
- Military career
- Allegiance: United States of America
- Branch: United States Navy
- Service years: 1904–1942
- Rank: Rear Admiral
- Nicknames: "Kim", "Hubbie", and "Mustafa"
- Commands: USS New York; Cruiser Division 7 Cruisers, Battle Force; United States Pacific Fleet
- Conflicts: Mexican Revolution; United States occupation of Veracruz; World War I; World War II; Attack on Pearl Harbor
- Awards: Mexican Service Medal; World War I Victory Medal; World War II Victory Medal

Husband Edward Kimmel (February 26, 1882 – May 14, 1968) was a United States Navy four-star admiral who was the commander in chief of the United States Pacific Fleet (CINCPACFLT) during the Japanese attack on Pearl Harbor. He was removed from that command after the attack, in December 1941, and was reverted to his permanent two-star rank of rear admiral due to no longer holding a four-star assignment. He retired from the Navy in early 1942. The U.S. Senate voted to change Kimmel's permanent rank to four stars in 1999, but President Clinton did not act on the resolution, and neither have any of his successors.

== Life and career ==
=== Early life ===
Husband Kimmel was born in Henderson, Kentucky, on February 26, 1882, to Sibella "Sibbie" Lambert Kimmel (1846–1919) and Major Manning Marius Kimmel (1832–1916), a graduate of West Point who fought with the Union side during the American Civil War before switching allegiance to the Confederate States Army to fight alongside his neighbors. Kimmel was a descendant of Herman Husband.

Kimmel was known by various nicknames throughout his life: "Kim" and "Hubbie", contractions of his given and family names, and later, "Mustafa", the last being a reference to Mustafa Kemal Atatürk, due to the similar sounding (homophony) "Kimmel" and "Kemal".

He married Dorothy Kinkaid (1890–1975), sister of Admiral Thomas C. Kinkaid, with whom he had three sons: Manning, Thomas K. Kimmel and Edward R. Kimmel.

=== Naval career ===
Kimmel graduated in 1904 from the United States Naval Academy in Annapolis, Maryland. One of his classmates was future fleet admiral Willam Halsey. From 1906 to 1907 he served on several battleships in the Caribbean. In 1907 he was assigned to the USS Georgia during its participation in the around-the-world cruise of the Great White Fleet. Kimmel then served in the United States occupation of Veracruz, Mexico, during which he was wounded in April 1914.

In 1915 he was briefly appointed as an aide to Assistant Secretary of the Navy Franklin D. Roosevelt. During World War I, Kimmel served as a squadron gunnery officer in U.S. Battleship Division Nine which served as the Sixth Battle Squadron of the British Grand Fleet. After the war he served as Executive Officer aboard the battleship USS Arkansas, then in Washington, D.C., and the Philippines, as well as commanding two destroyer divisions before attaining the rank of captain in 1926 upon completion of the senior course at the Naval War College.

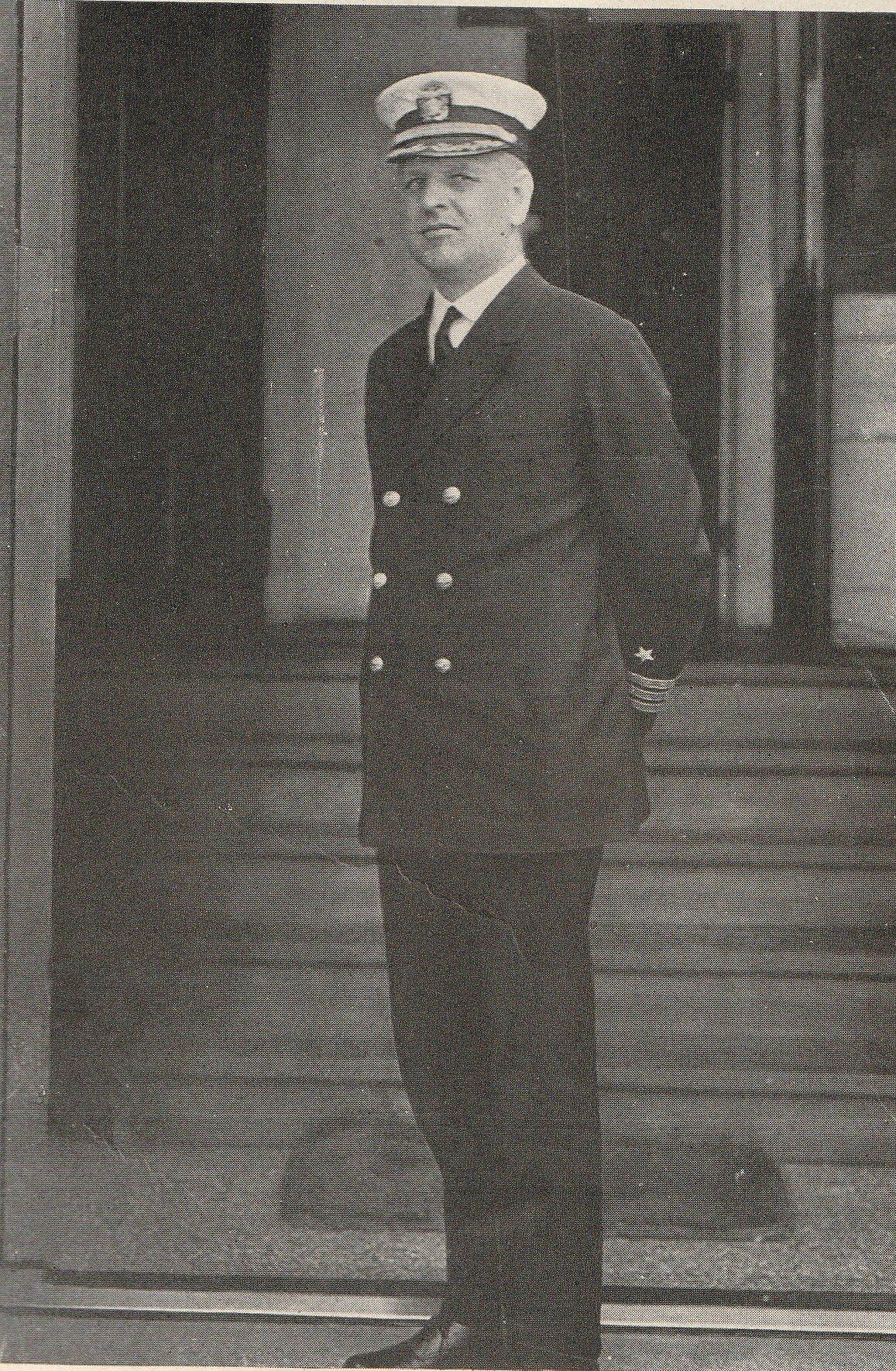
Commander Husband E. Kimmel, Production Officer, Naval Gun Factory 1921

From 1926 to 1937 Kimmel held a number of positions in the Navy Department, as well as the command of a destroyer squadron and of the battleship USS New York.

In 1937 he was promoted to the flag rank of rear admiral. In this capacity he commanded Cruiser Division Seven on a diplomatic cruise to South America and in 1939 became Commander of Battle Force Cruisers.

=== Pearl Harbor ===
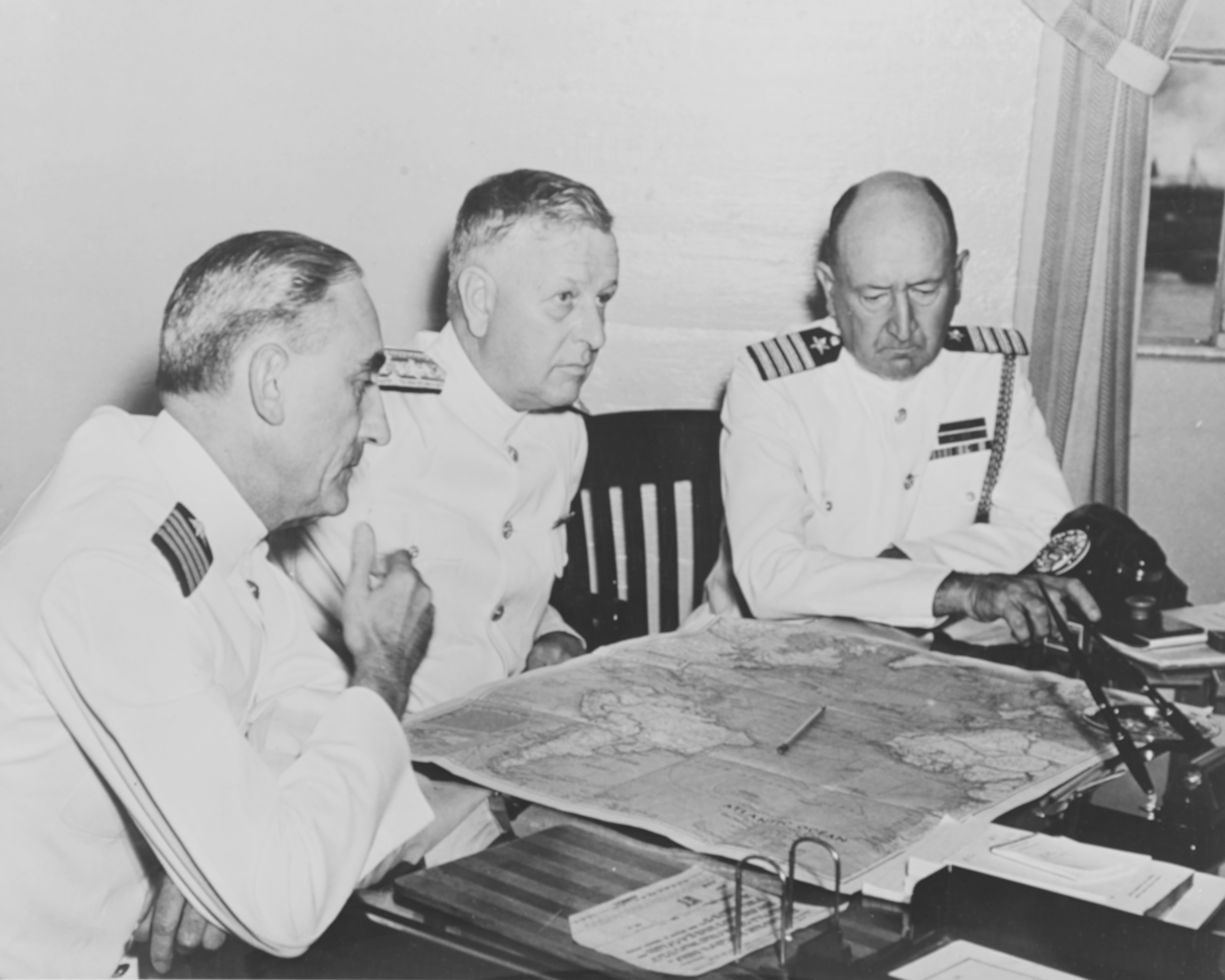
Kimmel (center) confers with his chief of staff, William "Poco" Smith; and operations officer and assistant chief of staff, Captain Walter S. DeLany (left), at Pearl Harbor, 1941.

After Admiral James O. Richardson was relieved of command in February 1941, in part for protesting that the Pacific Fleet if based in Pearl Harbor, Hawaii, would be the logical first target in the event of war with Japan, Kimmel was appointed in his place as Commander in Chief, United States Fleet (CINCUS). Kimmel was also appointed Commander in Chief, United States Pacific Fleet (CINCPACFLT), a position reestablished on February 1, 1941, when General Order 143 was issued, and Kimmel assumed command with the temporary rank of admiral starting on that date. Kimmel earned a reputation as a hard worker who inspired subordinates, but some later criticized him for over-attention to detail, claiming it portrayed a lack of self-confidence. These critics asserted that Kimmel constantly revisited minute tasks he had done previously when he could have delegated the work to others.

On the other hand, Kimmel's fleet gunnery officer Willard Kitts later testified that under Kimmel's leadership, "the efficiency and training of the Fleet was at its highest level." Halsey, who in 1941 commanded one of the Pacific Fleet's carrier task forces and rose during the war to five-star fleet admiral, described Kimmel as "the ideal man for the job."

The base for the fleet had been moved from its traditional home at San Diego, California, to Pearl Harbor, Hawaii, in May 1940. Richardson had been relieved of command for his vocal opposition to this move and concerns about the fleet's vulnerability. On February 18, 1941, Kimmel wrote to the Chief of Naval Operations (CNO), Admiral Harold Raynsford Stark:

I feel that a surprise attack (submarine, air, or combined) on Pearl Harbor is a possibility, and we are taking immediate practical steps to minimize the damage inflicted and to ensure that the attacking force will pay.

On April 18, 1941, Kimmel wrote to the CNO requesting additional resources for base construction at Wake Island and for a Marine Corps defense battalion to be stationed there. On August 19 the first permanent Marine garrison was assigned. Naval Air Station Midway was commissioned in August after the completion of runways and support structures, and a Marine garrison assigned shortly afterwards. In November Kimmel ordered USS Enterprise to ferry Marine fighters and pilots to Wake Island to reinforce the garrison, and for USS Lexington to depart Pearl Harbor on December 5 to ferry Marine dive bombers to Midway. Because of these missions, neither aircraft carrier was in Pearl Harbor during the later Japanese attack.

Japan's attack on Pearl Harbor occurred in an air raid on December 7, 1941, and caused the deaths of 2,403 U.S. military personnel and civilians. Edwin T. Layton related that during the attack:

Kimmel stood by the window of his office at the submarine base, his jaw set in stony anguish. As he watched the disaster across the harbor unfold with terrible fury, a spent .50 caliber machine gun bullet crashed through the glass. It brushed the admiral before it clanged to the floor. It cut his white jacket and raised a welt on his chest. "It would have been merciful had it killed me," Kimmel murmured to his communications officer, Commander Maurice "Germany" Curts.

In The World at War, a naval serviceman—who had been alongside Admiral Kimmel during the attack—recalled that as Kimmel watched the destruction of the fleet, he tore off his four-star shoulder boards in apparent recognition of the impending end of his command.

=== After Pearl Harbor ===
Kimmel was relieved of his command ten days after the attack. At the time he was planning and executing retaliatory moves, including an effort to relieve and reinforce Wake Island that could have led to an early clash between American and Japanese carrier forces. Vice Admiral William S. Pye (Commander, Battle Force, Pacific Fleet) became acting CINCPACFLT on December 17. He had reservations about Kimmel's plan and decided the Wake Island operation was too risky, recalling the relief force. Admiral Chester W. Nimitz took over as CINCPACFLT on December 31 and by that time Wake Island had been invaded and occupied by the Japanese. Kimmel's CINCUS command was reassigned to Admiral Ernest J. King (at that time Commander in Chief, U.S. Atlantic Fleet [CINCLANTFLT]) in a wartime expanded role of Commander in Chief, United States Fleet (with the new acronym of COMINCH), which would also be combined with King's subsequent appointment as the Chief of Naval Operations.

In 1942, the Roberts Commission, appointed by President Roosevelt to investigate the attack, determined that Kimmel and his counterpart, Army Lieutenant General Walter Short, were guilty of errors of judgment and dereliction of duty in the events leading up to the attack. Kimmel defended his decisions at several hearings, testifying that important information had not been made available to him.

Following the death of Secretary Knox in April 1944, his successor James V. Forrestal ordered that a Naval Court of Inquiry be convened to investigate the facts surrounding the Japanese attack on Pearl Harbor and to assess any culpability borne by members of the Navy. The court consisted of Admiral Adolphus Andrews; Admiral Orin G. Murfin, who served as President of the Court, and Admiral Edward C. Kalbfus. The court convened on July 24, 1944, and held daily sessions in Washington, D.C., San Francisco, and Pearl Harbor. After interviewing numerous witnesses, it completed its work on October 19, 1944. Its report to the Navy Department largely exonerated Kimmel. The court found that Kimmel's decisions had been correct given the limited information available to him, but criticized then-Chief of Naval Operations Stark for failing to warn Kimmel that war was imminent. The court concluded that "based upon the facts established, the Court is of the opinion that no offenses have been committed nor serious blame incurred on the part of any person or persons in the naval service." Because the court's findings implicitly revealed that American cryptographers had broken the Japanese codes, a critical wartime secret, the court's report was not made public until after the end of the war.

Upon reviewing the report, Forrestal felt that the court had been too lenient in assigning blame for the disaster. The court had found that the Army and Navy had adequately cooperated in the defense of Pearl Harbor; that there had been no information indicating that Japanese carriers were on their way to attack Pearl Harbor; and that the attack had succeeded principally because of the aerial torpedo, a secret weapon whose use could not have been predicted. Forrestal disapproved of all of these findings, judging that Kimmel could have done more with the information he had to prevent or mitigate the attack. Forrestal concluded that both Kimmel and Stark had "failed to demonstrate the superior judgment necessary for exercising command commensurate with their rank and their assigned duties."

Kimmel retired in early 1942, and worked for the military contractor Frederic R. Harris, Inc. after the war. In retirement, Kimmel lived in Groton, Connecticut, where he died on May 14, 1968.

His son, Manning, died after the submarine he commanded, the USS Robalo, was sunk near Palawan on or around July 26, 1944. The Kimmel family at the time was informed that Manning had gone down with his ship. Though it was widely believed that Manning Kimmel died on board his boat, several sources (including Admiral Ralph Waldo Christie, commander of submarine operations at Fremantle at the time) stated after the war that Manning was one of a handful of survivors from his submarine, having been swept overboard as the boat sank after hitting a mine. According to these sources, Manning was captured by Japanese forces, and along with several other survivors from the Robalo was pushed into a ditch, doused with gasoline and burned alive by his captors, who were enraged over a recent American air attack.

== Posthumous reputation and debate ==
Historians agree that the United States was unprepared for the Japanese attack on Pearl Harbor at all levels, though this has been challenged by comments from MI6 spy Colonel Charles Howard 'Dick' Ellis, posthumously quoted in Jesse Fink's 2023 biography of Ellis, The Eagle in the Mirror.

Ellis was deputy to William Stephenson at British Security Co-ordination in New York.

Fink quotes Ellis: ‘[Stephenson] was convinced from the information that was reaching him that this attack was imminent, and through Jimmy Roosevelt, President Roosevelt’s son, he passed this information to the President. Now whether the President at that time had other information which corroborated this... it’s impossible to say.’

Japanese military forces enjoyed clear superiority in training, equipment, experience and planning over the Americans. The extent to which Kimmel himself bore responsibility for the unreadiness of his Pacific Fleet has been a matter of debate.

Some, such as submarine Captain Edward L. "Ned" Beach, concluded that Kimmel and Short, who was also dismissed from command, were made scapegoats for the failures of superiors in Washington. Kimmel's supporters point to a series of bureaucratic foulups and circumstances beyond anyone's control that led to the fleet's lack of preparedness, including poor atmospheric conditions that blocked a radio warning from the War Department to Pearl Harbor of a possible attack, forcing it to be sent as a telegram, which delayed it long enough for the attack to start before Kimmel received it (the telegram messenger was on his way to deliver the message when the attack commenced; he was forced to take cover in a ditch. Kimmel did not get the warning until after the attack ended).

Edwin T. Layton, chief intelligence officer for Kimmel and one of the officers who knew Kimmel best, provided support for Kimmel's position. Layton argued Kimmel had not been provided complete information and that Kimmel deployed the few reconnaissance resources at his disposal in the most logical way, given the available information.

On the other hand, Kimmel's critics point out that he had been ordered 10 days prior to the attack to initiate a "defensive deployment" of the fleet. Kimmel, thinking the main threat to the fleet was sabotage, kept much of the fleet in port and did not place the fleet on alert. When his intelligence unit lost track of Japan's aircraft carriers, he did not order long-range air or naval patrols to assess their positions. He had a poor working arrangement with his Army counterpart, Short, who was charged with defending the fleet while in port.

Historians generally recognize that American forces would have fared poorly even if Kimmel had reacted differently. In a 1964 interview, Admiral Chester Nimitz, who took over as commander of the Pacific Fleet three weeks after the attack, concluded that, "It was God's mercy that our fleet was in Pearl Harbor on December 7." If Kimmel "[had] had advance notice that the Japanese were coming, he most probably would have tried to intercept them. With the difference in speed between Kimmel's battleships and the faster Japanese carriers, the former could not have come within rifle range of the enemy's flattops. As a result, we would have lost many ships in deep water and also thousands more in lives." Instead, at Pearl Harbor, the crews were easily rescued, and six of eight front-line battleships ultimately raised. This was also the assessment of Joseph Rochefort, head of the US Navy's Station HYPO, who remarked the attack was cheap at the price.

In 1994 Kimmel's family, including his grandson, South Carolina broadcaster Manning Kimmel IV, attempted for the third time to have Kimmel's four-star rank reinstated. President Bill Clinton denied the request, as had Presidents Richard Nixon and Ronald Reagan. A 1995 Pentagon study concluded other high-ranking officers were also responsible for the failure at Pearl Harbor, but did not exonerate Kimmel.

On May 25, 1999, the United States Senate, by a vote of 52–47, passed a non-binding resolution to exonerate Kimmel and Short and requested that the President of the United States posthumously restore both men to full rank. Senator Strom Thurmond, one of the sponsors of the resolution, called Kimmel and Short "the two final victims of Pearl Harbor." The Senate enquiry in 2000 issued a lengthy exoneration of Kimmel's conduct. President Clinton did not act on the resolution, nor have any of his successors.

== Portrayals ==
Kimmel has been portrayed by:

- Franchot Tone (1965) In Harm's Way; Kimmel is portrayed as a victim of unfortunate circumstance.
- Martin Balsam (1970) Tora! Tora! Tora!; Kimmel is portrayed in a sympathetic light: a capable commander operating in an environment plagued by poor communication, inadequate training and systemic unreadiness.
- Andrew Duggan (1983) The Winds of War (TV miniseries)
- Colm Feore (2001) Pearl Harbor
- David Hewlett (2019) Midway

== Military awards ==

Cuban Pacification Medal	Mexican Service Medal	World War I Victory Medal with one campaign star
American Defense Service Medal with "BASE" clasp	Asiatic-Pacific Campaign Medal with one campaign star	World War II Victory Medal

== Bibliography ==
- Summers, Anthony; Swan, Robbyn (2016). A Matter of Honor: Pearl Harbor, Betrayal, Blame and a Family's Quest for Justice. New York: Harper. p. 29.

Military offices
Preceded by James O. Richardson	Commander in Chief of the United States Pacific Fleet; 1941	Succeeded by William S. Pye (Acting)
Preceded by James O. Richardson	Commander in Chief, United States Fleet; January 5, 1941 – December 1941	Succeeded by Ernest King
