= Thomas C. Kinkaid =

United States Navy admiral (1888–1972)

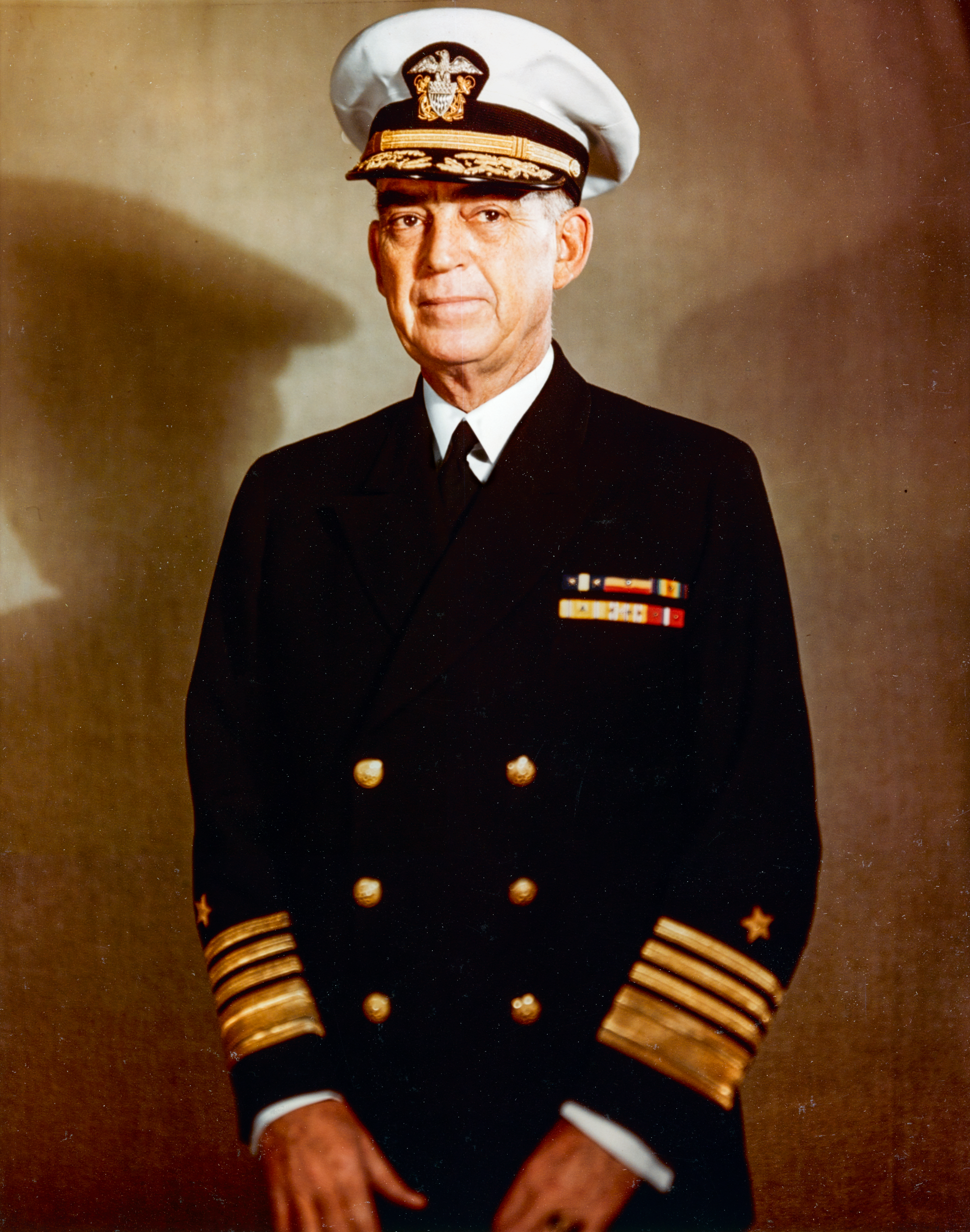
- Admiral Thomas C. Kinkaid
- Born: Thomas Cassin Kinkaid; 3 April 1888; Hanover, New Hampshire, US
- Died: 17 November 1972 (aged 84); Bethesda, Maryland, US
- Burial place: Arlington National Cemetery
- Relatives: Husband E. Kimmel (brother in law); Manning Kimmel (nephew); Commodore John Cassin and his son Captain Stephen Cassin, distant relatives
- Military career
- Allegiance: United States
- Branch: United States Navy
- Service years: 1908–1950
- Rank: Admiral
- Commands: Eastern Sea Frontier; Sixteenth Fleet; Seventh Fleet; USS Indianapolis; USS Isherwood
- Conflicts: World War I; Banana Wars; Dominican intervention; Greco-Turkish War; World War II; Battle of the Coral Sea; Battle of Midway; Guadalcanal campaign; Battle of the Eastern Solomons; Battle of the Santa Cruz Islands; Aleutian Islands campaign; Operation Cartwheel; Admiralty Islands campaign; Western New Guinea campaign; Philippines campaign; Battle of Leyte Gulf; Operation Blacklist Forty; Chinese Civil War; Operation Beleaguer
- Awards: Navy Distinguished Service Medal (3); Army Distinguished Service Medal; Legion of Merit; Philippine Liberation Medal; Companion of the Order of the Bath (Australia); Grand Officer of the Order of Orange-Nassau (Netherlands); Grand Cordon of the Order of Precious Tripod (China); Grand Officer of the Order of Leopold (Belgium); Croix de Guerre with Palm (Belgium)
- Other work: National Security Training Commission; American Battle Monuments Commission

Thomas Cassin Kinkaid (3 April 1888 – 17 November 1972) was an admiral in the United States Navy, known for his service during World War II. He built a reputation as a "fighting admiral" in the aircraft carrier battles of 1942 and commanded the Allied forces in the Aleutian Islands Campaign. He was Commander Allied Naval Forces and the Seventh Fleet under General of the Army Douglas MacArthur in the Southwest Pacific Area, where he conducted numerous amphibious operations, and commanded an Allied fleet during the Battle of Leyte Gulf, the largest naval battle of World War II and the last naval battle between battleships in history.

Born into a naval family, Kinkaid was ranked in the lower half of his class on his graduation from the United States Naval Academy in June 1908. His early commissioned service was spent aboard battleships. In 1913, he began instruction in ordnance engineering and served in that field for many years. He saw action during the 1916 United States occupation of the Dominican Republic. During World War I, he was attached to the Royal Navy before serving as gunnery officer aboard the battleship USS Arizona. After the war, he was assistant chief of staff to the Commander U.S. Naval Detachment in Turkey. Kinkaid received his first command, the destroyer USS Isherwood, in 1924. He was executive officer of the battleship USS Colorado when the 1933 Long Beach earthquake struck, and participated in relief efforts. He received his second command in 1937, the heavy cruiser USS Indianapolis.

From 1938 to 1941, Kinkaid was a naval attaché in Italy and Yugoslavia. In the months prior to U.S. entry into World War II, he commanded a destroyer squadron. Promoted to rear admiral in 1941, he assumed command of a U.S. Pacific Fleet cruiser division. His cruisers defended the aircraft carrier USS Lexington during the Battle of the Coral Sea and USS Hornet during the Battle of Midway. After that battle, he took command of Task Force 16, a task force built around the carrier USS Enterprise, which he led during the long and difficult Solomon Islands campaign, participating in the Battles of the Eastern Solomons and the Santa Cruz Islands. Kinkaid was placed in charge of the North Pacific Force in January 1943 and commanded the operations that regained control of the Aleutian Islands. He was promoted to vice admiral in June 1943.

In November 1943, Kinkaid became Commander Allied Naval Forces South West Pacific Area, and commander of the Seventh Fleet, directing U.S. and Royal Australian Navy forces supporting the New Guinea campaign. During the Battle of the Surigao Strait, he commanded the Allied ships in the last naval battle between battleships in history. Following the demise of Japanese naval power in the region, the Allied navies supported the campaigns in the Philippines and Borneo. Kinkaid was promoted to admiral on 3 April 1945. After the Pacific War ended in August 1945, the Seventh Fleet assisted in operations on the Korean and China coasts. Admiral Kinkaid was Commander Eastern Sea Frontier and the Sixteenth Fleet from 1946 until his retirement in May 1950. He was a member of the National Security Training Commission for much of the rest of the decade. He also served with the American Battle Monuments Commission for 15 years.

== Early life ==
Thomas Cassin Kinkaid was born in Hanover, New Hampshire, on 3 April 1888, the second child and only son of Thomas Wright Kinkaid, a naval officer, and his wife Virginia Lee née Cassin. At the time, Thomas Wright Kinkaid was on leave from the U.S. Navy and employed at the New Hampshire College of Agriculture and the Mechanic Arts. When Thomas was only a year old, his father was posted to USS Pinta, and the family moved to Sitka, Alaska, where a third child, Dorothy, was born in 1890. Over the next few years the family successively moved to Philadelphia, Pennsylvania; Norfolk, Virginia; Annapolis, Maryland, and Georgetown, Washington, D.C.

Thomas attended Western High School for three years before entering a U.S. Naval Academy preparatory school. He sought and secured an appointment to Annapolis from President Theodore Roosevelt, and was asked to take the admission examination. The Navy was undergoing a period of expansion, and the intake of midshipmen was double that of two years earlier. Of the 350 who took the examination, 283 were admitted. The class was the largest since the Academy had opened in 1845.

Kinkaid was admitted to Annapolis as a midshipman in July 1904. His instructors included four future Chiefs of Naval Operations: William S. Benson, William V. Pratt, William D. Leahy and Ernest J. King. In 1905 he took an instructional cruise on USS Nevada. He also spent six weeks on USS Hartford, his only experience of a warship under sail. In subsequent years, his training cruises were on USS Newark and USS Arkansas which, while much newer, were by this time also obsolete. He participated in sports, particularly in rowing, earning a seat in the Academy's eight-oar racing shell. He graduated on 5 June 1908, ranked 136th in his class of 201.

== Early career ==
Kinkaid's first posting was to San Francisco where he joined the crew of the battleship USS Nebraska, part of the Great White Fleet. During the next year, he circumnavigated the globe with the fleet, visiting New Zealand and Australia. The fleet returned to its home port of Norfolk, Virginia in February 1909. In 1910, Kinkaid took his examinations for the rank of ensign but failed navigation. While his classmates were promoted in June 1910, Kinkaid remained a midshipman, pending the result of a makeup examination in December 1910. In July, he developed pleurisy and was hospitalized in New York, New York, before being sent to Annapolis to recuperate. At the time, his father was in charge of the Naval Engineering Experiment Station there, which allowed Kinkaid to stay with his parents while studying for his navigation examination. In October, he was posted to the battleship USS Minnesota whose skipper, Commander William Sims, an Annapolis classmate of his father's, encouraged Kinkaid's early interest in gunnery. Kinkaid passed his navigation examination on 7 December and was promoted to ensign on 14 February 1911, backdated to 6 June 1910. While still at Annapolis, Kinkaid met Helen Sherburne Ross (1892–1980), the daughter of a Philadelphia businessman. The two were married on 24 April 1911 in the Silver Chapel of St. Mark's Episcopal Church in Philadelphia in a ceremony attended by a small number of guests. Their marriage produced no children. They enjoyed playing contract bridge and golf, and Helen was the women's golf champion for the District of Columbia in 1921 and 1922.

In 1913, Kinkaid, now a lieutenant (junior grade), commenced a course in ordnance at the Naval Academy Postgraduate School. This consisted of four months of classroom instruction followed by tours with the leading naval ordnance manufacturers, and concluded with a tour of duty at the Indian Head Naval Proving Ground. Students had to commit to remain in the Navy for at least eight years. After completing the four months in the classroom at Annapolis, Kinkaid commenced a three-month assignment at Midvale Steel, but this was interrupted after two months by the United States occupation of Veracruz. Kinkaid was ordered to report to the gunboat USS Machias for duty in the Caribbean, during which the ship participated in the 1916 United States occupation of the Dominican Republic. Kinkaid came under fire for the first time when the ship was fired upon from ashore. Machias replied with its machine guns. When one jammed, Kinkaid exposed himself to fire to assist in clearing the weapon. He fired it in response to gunfire against the ship. Machias returned home in December, and in February Kinkaid resumed his ordnance studies and went to Bausch & Lomb in Rochester, New York, where he studied the manufacture of spotting and fire control systems. In March he reported to the Washington Navy Yard, where he wrote a pamphlet on fire control. He also created a design for a human torpedo, but the Bureau of Ordnance decided that his concept was unsound. He completed his ordnance studies with tours at Bethlehem Steel, the Indian Head Naval Proving Ground and the Sperry Gyroscope Company in Brooklyn.

In July 1916, Kinkaid reported to USS Pennsylvania, the navy's newest battleship, as a gunfire spotter. He was promoted to lieutenant in January 1917. In November 1917, seven months after the American entry into World War I, he was ordered to supervise the delivery of a newly developed 20 ft (6.1 m) rangefinder from the Norfolk Navy Yard to the Grand Fleet. On reaching London, Kinkaid reported to Sims, now a vice admiral, who then ordered Kinkaid to deliver secret documents to Admiral William S. Benson at a meeting with Allied naval leaders in Paris. Afterwards, Kinkaid returned to the United Kingdom and tested the rangefinder at HMS Excellent on Whale Island, Hampshire. He visited optical works in London, York and Glasgow to study the British Royal Navy's rangefinders, and the Grand Fleet at its anchorages. On returning to the United States in January 1918, he visited Sperry Gyroscope and Ford Instruments to consult with them on fire control systems. Promoted to lieutenant commander in February 1918, he was posted to Pennsylvania's sister ship, USS Arizona. In May 1919, Arizona was sent to cover the Greek occupation of Smyrna. For his services from September 1918 to July 1919, Kinkaid was recommended for the Navy Distinguished Service Medal, but it was not awarded.

== Between the wars ==
Following the normal pattern of alternating assignments afloat and ashore, Kinkaid was posted to a shore billet as the Chief of the Supply Section of the Bureau of Ordnance in Washington, D.C. During this time he published two articles in the United States Naval Institute magazine Proceedings. The first, on the "Probability and Accuracy of Gun Fire", was a technical article arguing for more rather than bigger guns on battleships and cruisers. The Washington Naval Conference would prevent these ideas from being put into practice, by restricting the number and size of warships and their guns. The second, entitled "Naval Corps, Specialization and Efficiency", argued for increasing the specializations of line officers rather than creating separate corps of specialists, a more controversial topic at a time when naval aviators were agitating for the creation of a new specialist branch of their own.

In 1922, Kinkaid became Assistant Chief of Staff to the Commander U.S. Naval Detachment in Turkish Waters, Rear Admiral Mark L. Bristol. This tour saw the end of the Greek occupation of Smyrna. The ratification of the Treaty of Lausanne by Turkey resulted in a draw-down of U.S. naval forces in the region, reducing Bristol's post to a primarily diplomatic one. In 1924, Kinkaid, whose father had died in August 1920, requested a posting back to the United States owing to his mother's ill-health. The ship taking him back, the light cruiser USS Trenton, had to sail by way of Iran in order to collect the body of Vice Consul Robert Whitney Imbrie, who had been killed by an angry mob in Tehran.

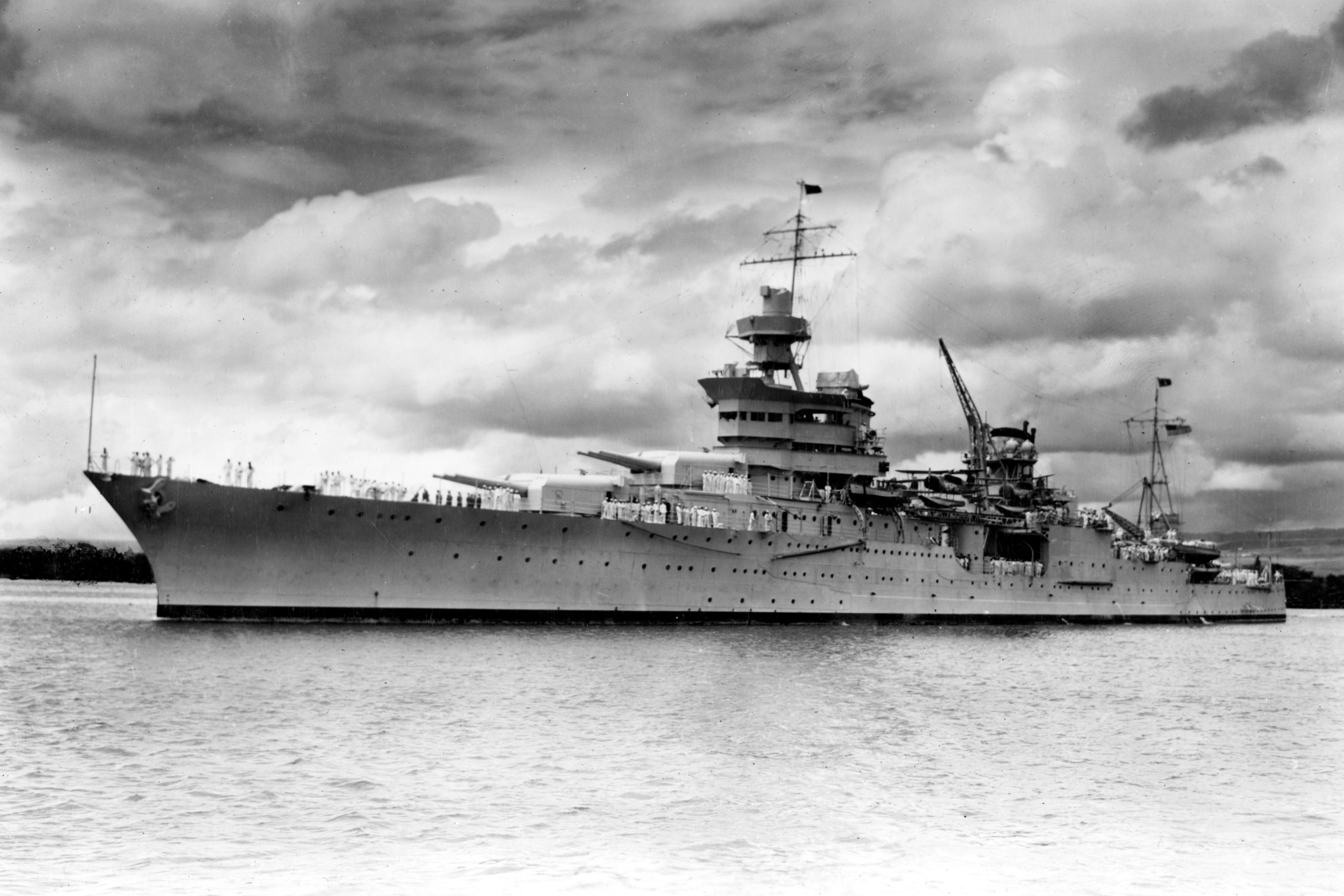
USS Indianapolis at Pearl Harbor, c. 1937

Kinkaid received his first command, the destroyer USS Isherwood, on 11 November 1924. Since its home port was the Philadelphia Navy Yard and ships' captains did not have to spend their nights on board, Kinkaid was able to live with Helen at her parents' residence in Philadelphia. In July 1925, he was assigned to the Naval Gun Factory. He was promoted to commander in June 1926. For the next two years, he served as Fleet Gunnery Officer and aide to the Commander in Chief, U.S. Fleet, Admiral Henry A. Wiley. In 1929 and 1930, Kinkaid attended the Naval War College. This was followed by duty on the Navy General Board. He was then seconded to the State Department as a Naval Advisor at the Geneva Disarmament Conference.

Kinkaid next became executive officer of USS Colorado, one of the navy's newest battleships, in February 1933. By coincidence the ship was at anchor in Long Beach, California, when the 1933 Long Beach earthquake struck. Over the next few days thousands of sailors and marines participated in relief activities. Kinkaid convinced the captain to allow homeless families of crew members to stay on the ship, and erected tarpaulins on the quayside to create family areas. He sent medical and relief supplies ashore from Colorado.

In 1934, he returned to Washington for a tour of duty with the Bureau of Navigation, in charge of the Officers' Detail Section. During this time, Kinkaid came up for promotion to captain. Classmates including Richmond K. Turner and Willis A. Lee were selected in January 1935, but Kinkaid was passed over for promotion. However, with the help of strong fitness reports from his superiors, Rear Admirals William D. Leahy and Adolphus Andrews, he was selected in January 1936 and, after passing the required physical and professional examinations, was promoted on 11 January 1937. Kinkaid was then given his second seagoing command, the heavy cruiser USS Indianapolis. He assumed command from Captain Henry K. Hewitt on 7 June 1937.

== World War II ==
=== Attaché ===
Kinkaid hoped his next assignment would be that of naval attaché to London, but that job went to Captain Alan G. Kirk. Kinkaid was offered and accepted the post in Rome instead. He took up his posting there in November 1938. In 1939, he was also accredited with the American embassy in Belgrade. Kinkaid reported that Italy was unprepared for war. Only in May 1940 did he warn that Italy was mobilizing. Soon after, he learned from Count Galeazzo Ciano that Italy would declare war on France and Britain between 10 and 15 June 1940. He provided accurate reports on the damage inflicted by the British in the Battle of Taranto. He returned to the U.S. in March 1941.

Kinkaid now faced the prospect of selection to rear admiral. He knew that captains normally required a certain amount of seagoing command experience to be considered, but because his tour of duty on Indianapolis had been cut short in order to take up the post in Rome, he did not have enough months, and it was unlikely that a billet as captain of a battleship or cruiser would come up in sufficient time before the next round of selections. He discussed the matter with head of the Officers' Detail Section at the Bureau of Navigation, Captain Arthur S. Carpender, an Annapolis classmate who had himself recently been selected for flag rank. Carpender came up with a solution: he recommended Kinkaid for command of a destroyer squadron. This was a seagoing command, although Kinkaid was somewhat senior for it. Good fitness reports as commander of Destroyer Squadron 8, based in Philadelphia, resulted in Kinkaid's promotion to rear admiral in August 1941, despite having no more than two years' worth of total command experience. He became the last of his class to be promoted to flag rank before the United States entered the war. No one ranking lower in the class was promoted to flag rank before retirement.

=== Coral Sea and Midway ===
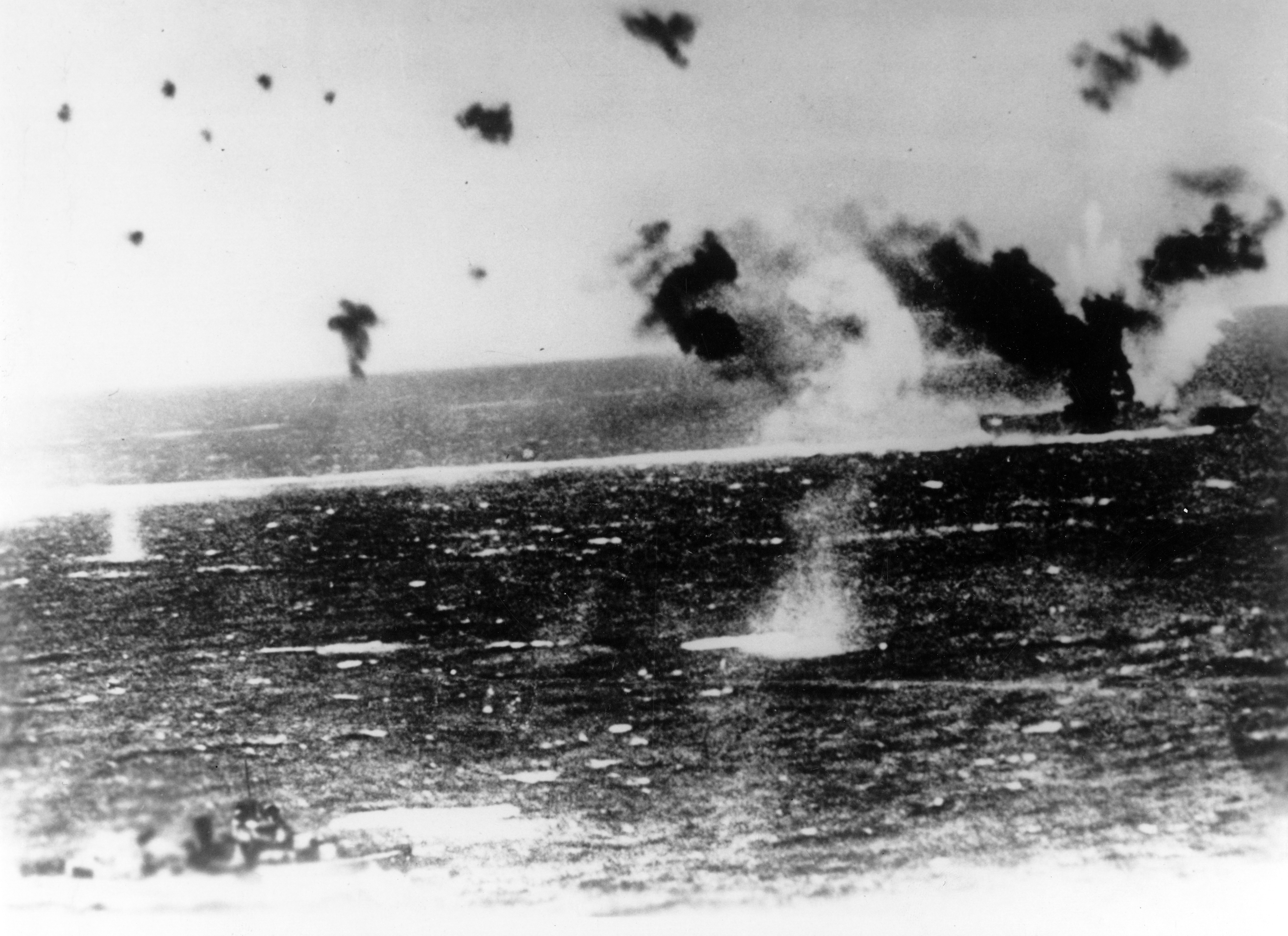
USS Lexington (center right), afire and under heavy attack, in a photograph taken from a Japanese aircraft

Kinkaid was ordered to relieve Rear Admiral Frank J. Fletcher as commander of Cruiser Division 6, consisting of the heavy cruisers USS Astoria, Minneapolis and San Francisco. This was part of the U.S. Pacific Fleet, based at Pearl Harbor. He did not reach his new command until after the Japanese attack on Pearl Harbor, which brought the U.S. into the war. When he reached Hawaii, Kinkaid stayed with his brother-in-law, the Commander in Chief, U.S. Fleet, Admiral Husband E. Kimmel, who was married to Kinkaid's sister Dorothy. Kinkaid accompanied Fletcher as an observer during the attempt to relieve Wake Island, and did not formally assume command of the division until 29 December 1941.

The traditional job of cruisers was scouting and screening, but with the loss of most of the battleships at Pearl Harbor these roles largely passed to the aircraft carriers, while the cruisers' main mission became defending the carriers against air attack. Kinkaid's cruisers formed part of Rear Admiral Aubrey W. Fitch's Task Force 11, which was built around the carrier USS Lexington. Task Force 11 rendezvoused with Fletcher's Task Force 17, built around the carrier USS Yorktown, on 1 May 1942. Kinkaid then became commander of the Task Group 17.2, the screening cruisers and destroyers of both carriers. Carrier warfare was in its infancy, and at this stage American carriers neither embarked adequate numbers of fighters, nor skillfully employed what they had. When Task Force 17 was attacked three days later in the Battle of the Coral Sea, the burden of defending the Task Force fell on Kinkaid's gunners. Their task was complicated by the radical maneuvering of the carriers under attack, which made it impossible for the screen to keep station. Despite the gunners' best efforts, both carriers were hit, and Lexington caught fire and sank. For his part in the battle, Kinkaid was awarded the Navy Distinguished Service Medal.

Kinkaid was detached with the cruisers Astoria, Minneapolis and New Orleans, and four destroyers on 11 May 1942 and sailed for Nouméa, while Fletcher took the rest of Task Force 17 to Tongatapu. Kinkaid then headed north to join the Vice Admiral William F. Halsey's Task Force 16. Kinkaid's force became part of its screen which was under the command of Rear Admiral Raymond A. Spruance. Shortly after Task Force 16 returned to Pearl Harbor, Halsey was hospitalized with a severe case of dermatitis and, on his recommendation, was replaced as commander of Task Force 16 by Spruance. Kinkaid then became commander of the screen, also known as Task Group 16.2. He was one of only four American flag officers present during the subsequent Battle of Midway. However, he saw little action, as Task Force 16 did not come under attack.

=== Solomon Islands ===
After the battle, Spruance became chief of staff to Admiral Chester W. Nimitz, the commander in chief, U.S. Pacific Fleet (CINCPAC) and Pacific Ocean Areas (CINCPOA). In Halsey's continued absence, Kinkaid became commander of Task Force 16, built around the carrier USS Enterprise, although he was not an aviator, and his experience with carriers had been restricted to commanding their screens at the Battle of the Coral Sea and the Battle of Midway. In early July, Kinkaid was briefed by Nimitz about plans for a landing in the Solomon Islands, codenamed Operation Watchtower. For this operation, Kinkaid's Task Force 16 would be one of three carrier task forces under Fletcher's overall command. To protect his flagship, Enterprise, Kinkaid had the battleship USS North Carolina, heavy cruiser USS Portland, antiaircraft cruiser USS Atlanta, and five destroyers. The addition of the new battleship and its twenty 5 in (130 mm)/38 caliber dual-purpose guns greatly strengthened Task Force 16's antiaircraft defenses.

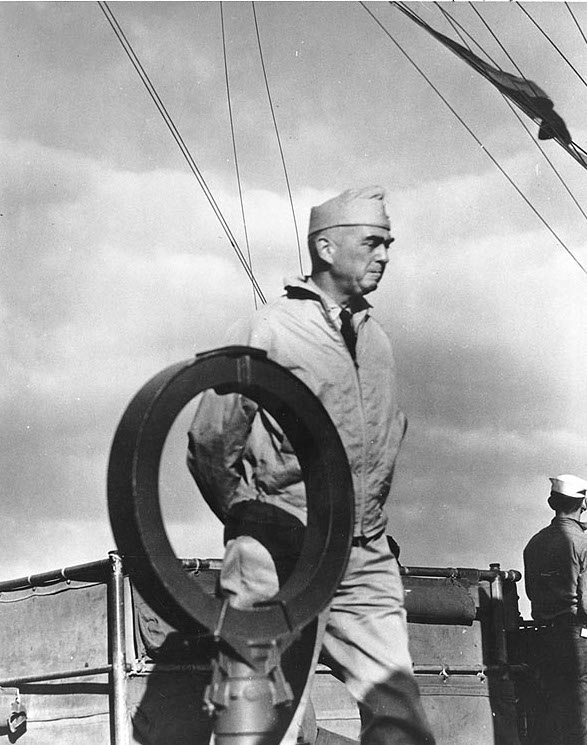
Rear Admiral Thomas C. Kinkaid on board his flagship, USS Enterprise, 22 July 1942.

The American landing on Guadalcanal evoked a furious reaction from the Japanese, who sent their fleet to reinforce the Japanese garrison on Guadalcanal. Fletcher's carriers had the mission of protecting the sea lanes to the Solomons. The two carrier forces clashed in the Battle of the Eastern Solomons. Kinkaid disposed his carrier task force in a circular formation, with Enterprise at the center, the cruisers at 10 and 2 o'clock and the battleship aft at 6 o'clock. This proved to be a mistake. With a top speed of 27 kn (31 mph; 50 km/h), the battleship fell behind the carrier when the latter accelerated to 30 kn (35 mph; 56 km/h) while under attack, depriving itself of the protection of the battleship's guns. Enterprise came under direct attack by Japanese aircraft, taking three bomb hits that killed 74 of its crew. Extraordinary efforts permitted the carrier to continue operating aircraft, but it was forced to return to Pearl Harbor for repairs. In his report after the battle, Kinkaid recommended that the number of fighters carried by each carrier be further increased. For his part in the battle, he was awarded his second Distinguished Service Medal.

Task Force 16 returned to the South Pacific in October 1942, just in time to take part in the decisive action of the campaign, the Battle of the Santa Cruz Islands, when the Japanese Army and Navy made an all-out effort to recapture the airfield of Guadalcanal. In addition to Enterprise, Kinkaid's force included the battleship South Dakota, heavy cruiser Portland, anti-aircraft cruiser San Juan, and eight destroyers. Fortunately, both Enterprise and South Dakota had been fitted with the new Bofors 40 mm anti-aircraft guns. In the three early carrier battles, Kinkaid had been a subordinate commander. This time, he was in overall command, in charge of Task Force 61, which included both his own Task Force 16 and Rear Admiral George D. Murray's Task Force 17, built around the aircraft carrier USS Hornet. The battle unfolded badly. Hornet was sunk, and Enterprise, South Dakota and San Juan were severely damaged. Aviators like Murray and John H. Towers blamed Kinkaid, as a non-aviator, for the loss of Hornet. It became a black mark on Kinkaid's record. The Japanese had won another tactical victory, but Kinkaid's carriers had gained the Americans precious time to prepare and reinforce.

=== Aleutian Islands ===
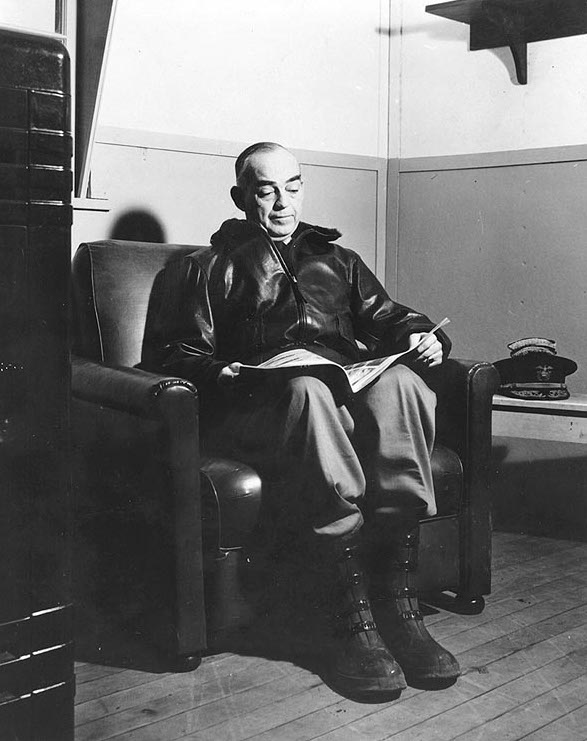
Kinkaid as Commander, North Pacific Force, reading in his quarters on Adak, Aleutian Islands, 14 May 1943.

On 4 January 1943, Kinkaid became commander of the North Pacific Force (COMNORPACFOR) following the failure of his predecessor, Rear Admiral Robert A. Theobald, to work harmoniously with the U.S. Army. Command relationships in the North Pacific were complicated. Naval forces came under Fletcher's Northwestern Sea Frontier. The troops in Alaska, including Major General William O. Butler's Eleventh Air Force, were commanded by Major General Simon B. Buckner, Jr., who was answerable to the head of the Western Defense Command, Lieutenant General John L. DeWitt. Kinkaid's command was responsible for coordinating these forces and retaking the Aleutian Islands captured by the Japanese. He found the Army eager to cooperate, but encountered more difficulty with Rear Admiral Francis W. Rockwell, the commander of the Amphibious Force, Pacific Fleet, and later the IX Amphibious Force. Rockwell was an Academy classmate of Kinkaid's, who was senior to him in rank, and convinced that he would both plan and command the amphibious phase of the operation rather than Kinkaid.

The War Department's original plan was to attack the main force on Kiska Island, but it took Kinkaid's suggestion to bypass Kiska in favor of an assault on the less heavily defended Attu Island. Kinkaid moved his headquarters to Adak to be with those of Buckner and Butler, and at Buckner's suggestion established a joint mess where their two staffs ate meals together. However, the amphibious planning was done in San Diego by Rockwell and his U.S. Marine Corps advisor, Brigadier General Holland M. Smith. The Battle of Attu was only the third American amphibious operation of the war, and was carried through to a costly success under difficult conditions. The slow rate of progress ashore caused Kinkaid to relieve the Army commander, Major General Albert E. Brown and replace him with Major General Eugene M. Landrum. In June 1943, Kinkaid was promoted to vice admiral, thereby removing any lingering doubts about who was in charge, and awarded his third Distinguished Service Medal. He now prepared Operation Cottage, the much larger invasion of Kiska. This was carried out as planned, but the invaders found that the Japanese had already evacuated the islands. In September 1943, Kinkaid was replaced by Vice Admiral Frank Fletcher.

=== Southwest Pacific ===
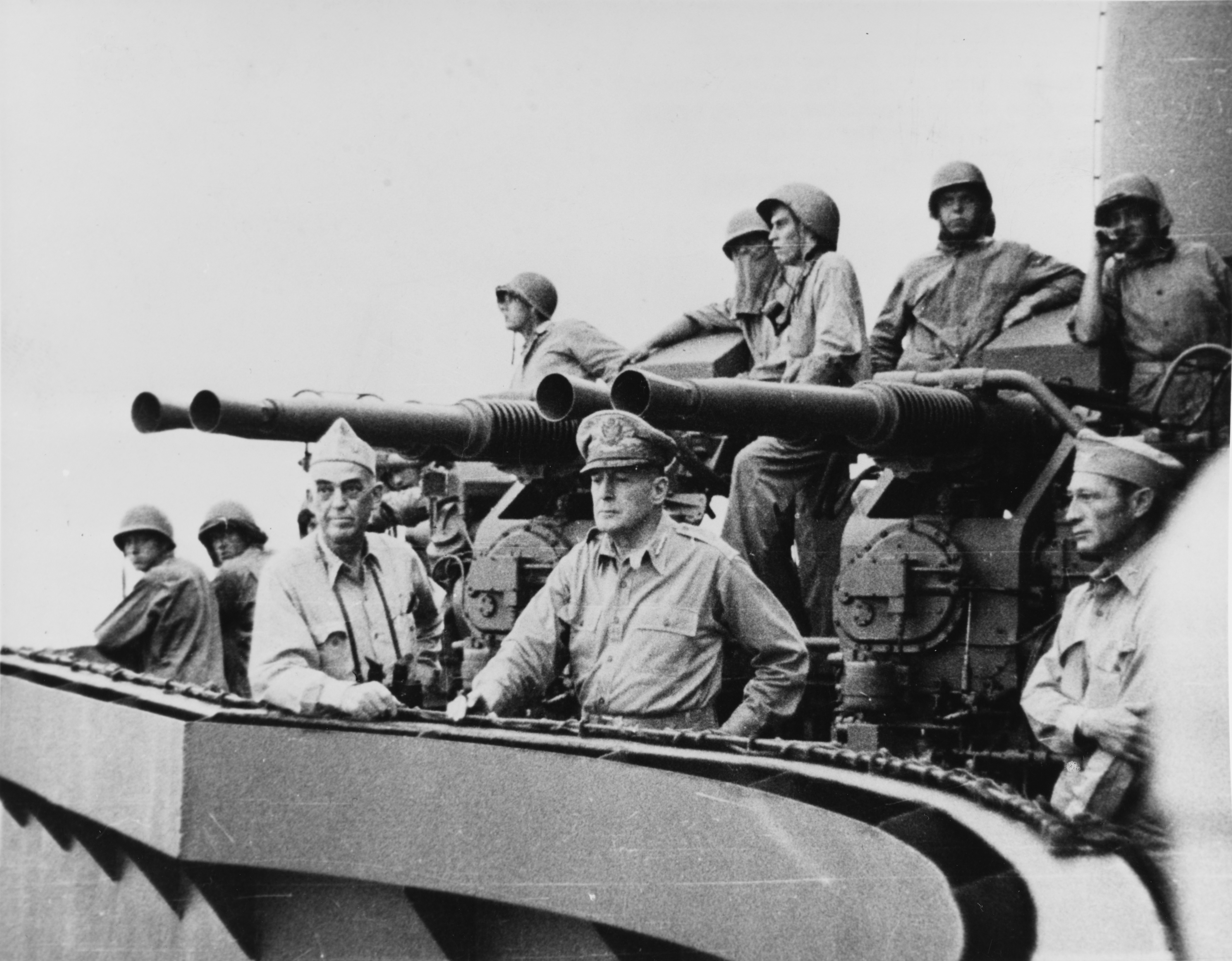
Kinkaid (left center) with General MacArthur (center) on the flag bridge of USS Phoenix during the pre-invasion bombardment of Los Negros Island.

In November 1943, Kinkaid replaced Carpender as Commander Allied Naval Forces, Southwest Pacific Area, and the Seventh Fleet, known as "MacArthur's Navy". General Douglas MacArthur had twice requested Carpender's relief, and Kinkaid's record working with the Army in Alaska made him a logical choice. Australian newspapers hailed the appointment of a "fighting admiral", but neither MacArthur nor the Australian government had been consulted about the appointment, which was made by the commander in chief, United States Fleet, Admiral Ernest King. This was a violation of the international agreement that had established the Southwest Pacific Area. The Navy Department then announced that the replacement of Carpender with Kinkaid was merely a proposal, and MacArthur and the Prime Minister of Australia, John Curtin, were asked if Kinkaid was acceptable. They agreed that he was. In his new role, Kinkaid had two masters. As commander of the Seventh Fleet, he was answerable to King, but as Commander Allied Naval Forces, Kinkaid was answerable to MacArthur. Operations were conducted on the basis of "mutual cooperation" rather than "unity of command", and relations between the Army and Navy were not good. Kinkaid was not the most senior naval officer in the theater, for the Royal Australian Navy's Admiral Sir Guy Royle and the Royal Netherlands Navy's Admiral Conrad Helfrich were both senior to him.

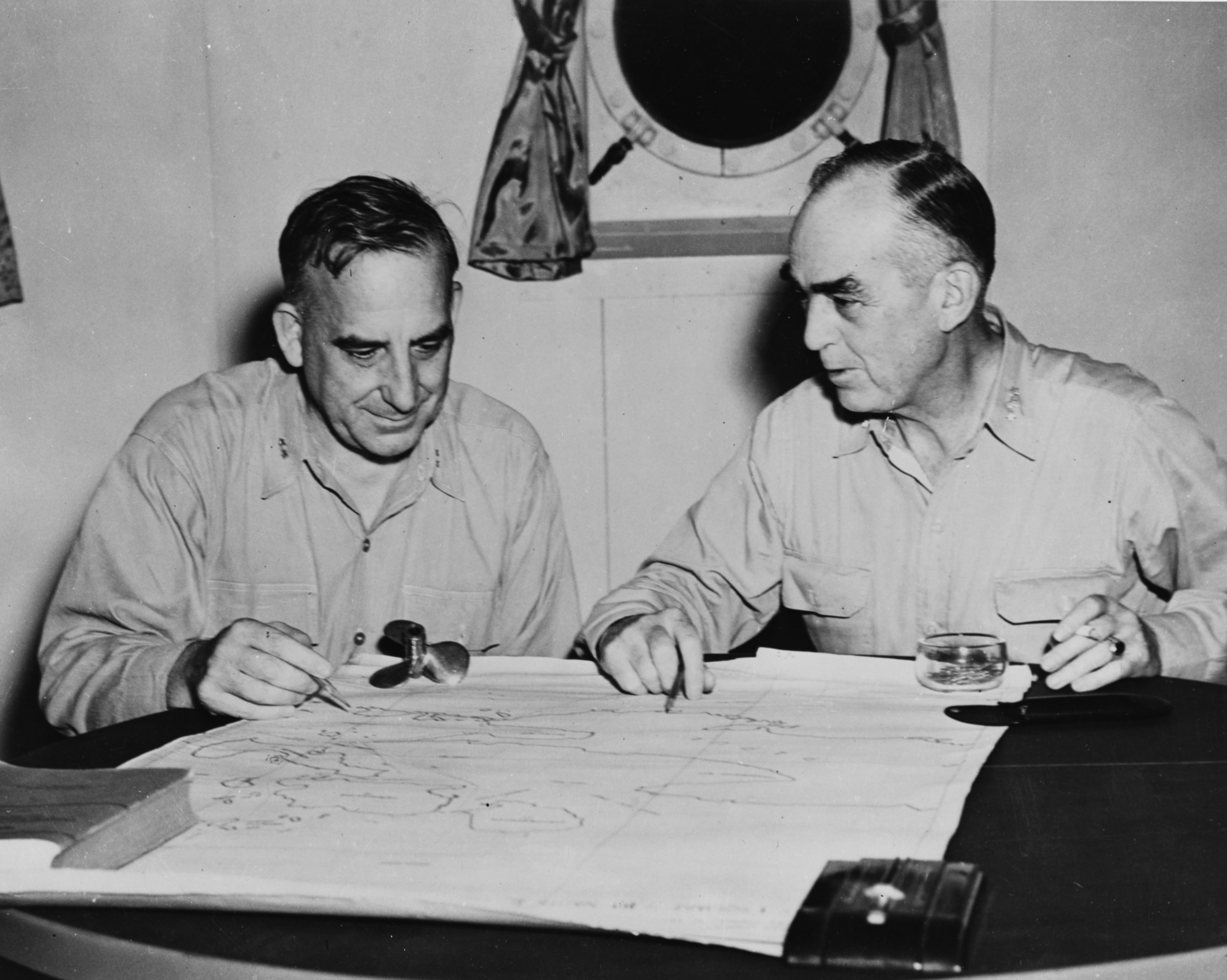
Kinkaid (right) with Rear Admiral Daniel E. Barbey (left)

Despite the unpromising relationship with the army, Kinkaid's most troublesome subordinate was a U.S. Navy officer, as had been the case with Rockwell in the Aleutians. This time, the subordinate was Rear Admiral Ralph W. Christie, the commander of Task Force 71, the Seventh Fleet's submarines. Christie commonly greeted a returning submarine at the pier and awarded decorations on the spot. This practice bypassed military and naval award boards, and annoyed Kinkaid because confirmation of sinkings was accomplished by Ultra, and news of awards given so quickly could constitute a security breach. Kinkaid gave Christie and his other subordinates orders forbidding pierside awards, and the award of army medals to navy personnel. In June 1944, Christie accompanied a war patrol on Commander Samuel D. Dealey's submarine USS Harder. Afterward, Christie met with MacArthur and related the events of the war patrol to the general, who decided to award Dealey the Distinguished Service Cross and Christie the Silver Star. When Harder was lost with Dealey and all hands on its next patrol, Christie recommended Dealey for the Medal of Honor. Kinkaid turned down the recommendation on the grounds that Dealey had already received the Distinguished Service Cross for the same patrol. Angered, Christie sent a dispatch to Kinkaid in an easily decipherable low-order code that criticized him and urged him to reconsider. Upset by both Christie's attitude and his losses, which included Dealey and Kinkaid's nephew, Lieutenant Commander Manning Kimmel on USS Robalo in July 1944, Kinkaid requested Christie's relief. On 30 December 1944, Christie was replaced by Captain James Fife Jr.

Other forces under Kinkaid's command included the cruisers of Task Force 74 under Rear Admiral Victor Crutchley, Task Force 75 under Russell S. Berkey, and Task Force 76, the VII Amphibious Force, under Rear Admiral Daniel E. Barbey. The main role of the Seventh Fleet was supporting MacArthur's drive along the northern coast of New Guinea with a series of 38 amphibious operations, usually directed by Barbey. Kinkaid accompanied MacArthur for the landing in the Admiralty Islands, where the two men came ashore a few hours after the assault troops. With 215 vessels involved, Operations Reckless and Persecution in April 1944 together constituted the largest operation in New Guinea waters. It was followed in quick succession by four more operations, at Wakde, Biak, Noemfor and Sansapor.

For MacArthur's long-awaited return to the Philippines in October 1944, the Seventh Fleet was massively reinforced by Nimitz's Pacific Fleet. Kinkaid commanded the assault personally, with Barbey's VII Amphibious Force as Task Force 78, joined by Vice Admiral Theodore S. Wilkinson's III Amphibious Force from the Pacific Fleet as Task Force 79. Kinkaid was also given Rear Admiral Jesse B. Oldendorf's Task Force 77.2, a bombardment force built around six old battleships that had survived the attack on Pearl Harbor, and Rear Admiral Thomas L. Sprague's Task Force 77.4, a force of escort carriers. However, Vice Admiral Marc Mitscher's Task Force 38, the covering force of the fast carriers and battleships, remained part of Admiral Halsey's Third Fleet, which was not under MacArthur or Kinkaid's command.

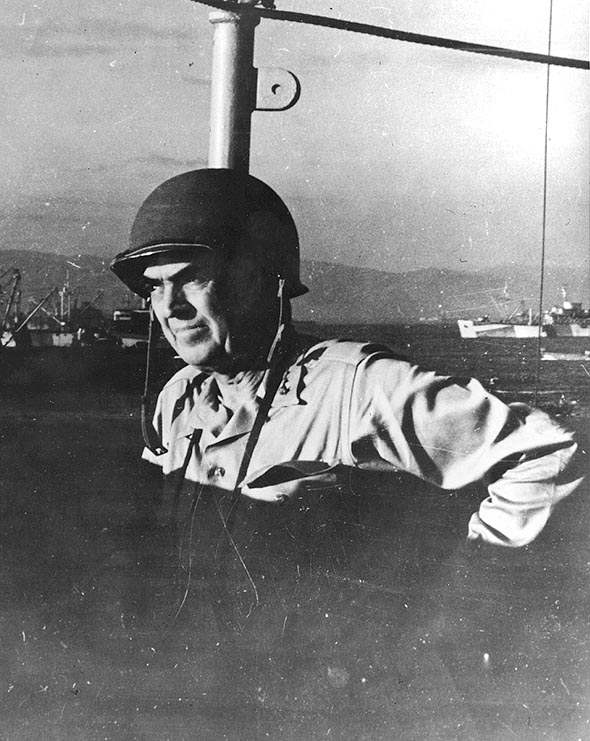
Kinkaid watches landing operations in Lingayen Gulf, Luzon, from the bridge of his flagship, USS Wasatch, 9 January 1945

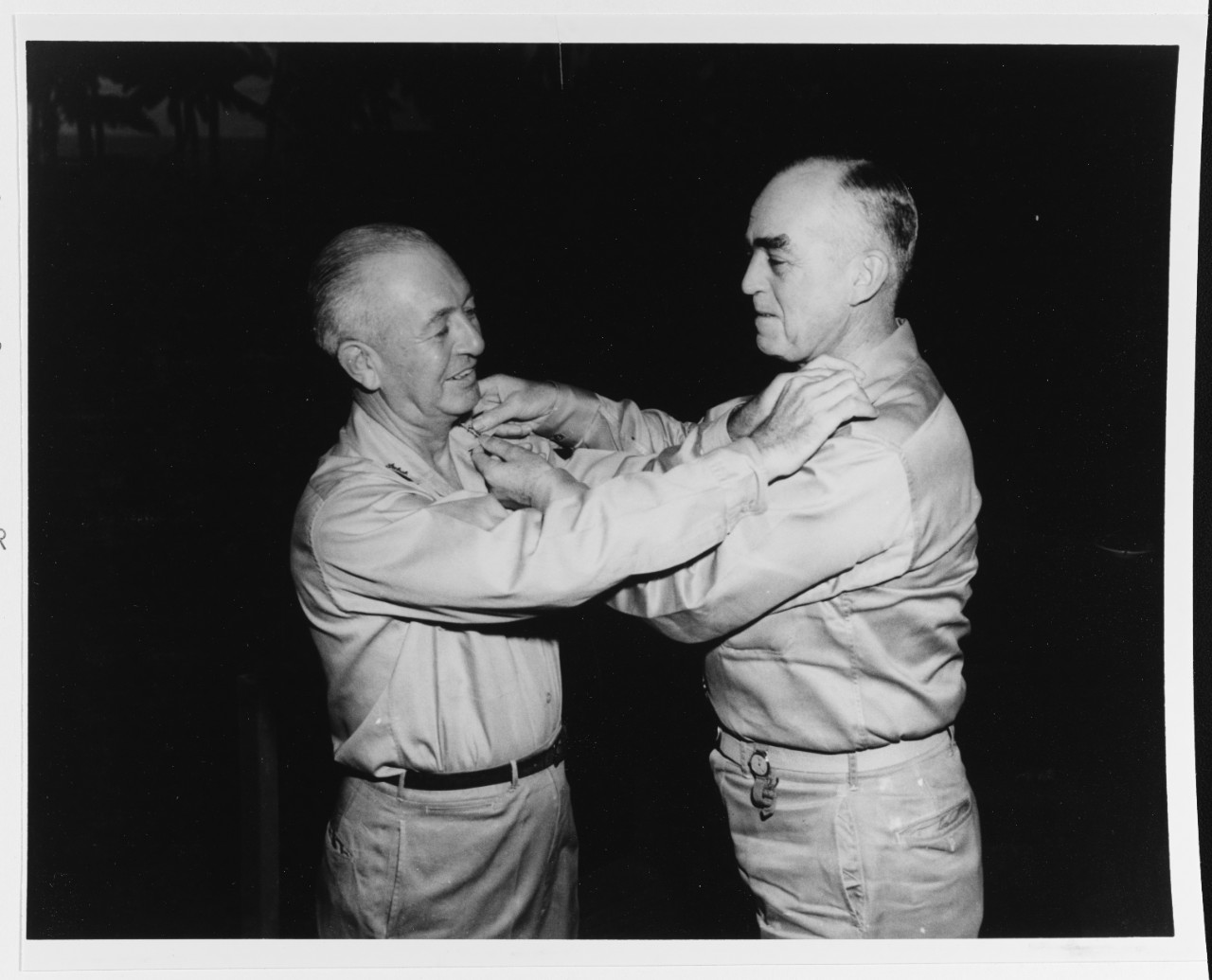
Classmates: James L. Kauffman (left), and Kinkaid, both newly promoted pin the insignia of their new rank, each on the other, at their Philippine headquarters, 6 April 1945.

Halsey's orders, which gave priority to the destruction of the Japanese fleet, led to the most controversial episode of the Battle of Leyte Gulf. Four Japanese task forces converged on Kinkaid's forces in Leyte Gulf: a carrier task force under Vice Admiral Jisaburō Ozawa, from the north; a force under Vice Admiral Takeo Kurita through the Sibuyan Sea; and two task forces commanded by Vice Admirals Shōji Nishimura and Kiyohide Shima, which approached via the Surigao Strait. Carrier aircraft from Task Force 38 engaged Kurita in the Battle of the Sibuyan Sea, and forced him to withdraw. In a controversial decision, Halsey concluded that Kurita was no longer a threat and headed north after Ozawa's force but, due to a misunderstanding, Kinkaid believed that Halsey was still guarding the San Bernardino Strait. Kinkaid deployed all available Seventh Fleet vessels in the Surigao Strait under Oldendorf facing Nishimura and Shima.

In the Battle of the Surigao Strait that night, Kinkaid engaged the Japanese with his PT boats and Oldendorf's destroyers, cruisers and battleships. Oldendorf was able to "cross the T" of the enemy fleet. It was the last occasion in history where battleships fought each other. Of Nishimura's two battleships and five lesser ships, only the destroyer Shigure survived; Kinkaid's PT force lost only PT-493, with 3 killed and 20 wounded. In Oldendorf's task force, only the destroyer Albert W. Grant was hit, mostly by friendly fire. Total Allied casualties were 39 men killed and 114 wounded.

However, the victory was marred when Kurita's force doubled back and engaged Sprague's escort carriers in the Battle off Samar the next day. Oldendorf's force headed back but Kurita withdrew after sinking an escort carrier, two destroyers and a destroyer escort. After the war, Halsey defended his actions in his memoirs. Kinkaid's position was that:

Of course it would have been sound practice and better to have an overall commander of naval forces.... However, the Third Fleet and the Seventh Fleet each had an assigned mission which, if fulfilled, would have resulted in the destruction of the Japanese fleet then and there. The question of an overall commander at the scene of action would have been purely academic. Most surely Nimitz's orders to Halsey did not contemplate the withdrawal of covering forces at the height of battle. "Divided Command" is not the key to what happened at Leyte. "Mission" is the key.

Following the demise of Japanese naval power in the region, Kinkaid's Seventh Fleet supported the land campaigns in the Philippines and the Borneo. Kinkaid was promoted to admiral on 3 April 1945. After the Pacific War ended in August 1945, the Seventh Fleet assisted in landing troops in Korea and northern China to occupy these areas and repatriate Allied prisoners of war. Kinkaid elected not to land troops at Chefoo as originally instructed because the city was in the hands of the Communist Eighth Route Army; Qingdao was substituted instead. He was awarded the Legion of Merit by the theater commander in China, Lieutenant General Albert C. Wedemeyer, and the Grand Cordon of the Order of Precious Tripod by the Chinese government.

== Later life ==
Kinkaid returned to the United States to replace Vice Admiral Herbert F. Leary as Commander Eastern Sea Frontier and Commander Sixteenth Fleet, making his home in the historic Quarters A, Brooklyn Navy Yard. He served on a board chaired by Fleet Admiral Halsey which also included Admirals Spruance, Towers and Vice Admiral Marc Mitscher, whose task was to nominate 50 of the 215 serving rear admirals for early retirement. Kinkaid was soon facing this fate himself, when the House Armed Services Committee sought to reduce the number of four-star rank officers in 1947. Kinkaid was one of three admirals, the others being Spruance and Hewitt, who would have to retire or be reduced in rank to rear admiral. After some lobbying, this was averted, and they were permitted to remain in the grade until 1 July 1950, past Kinkaid's retirement age. Retirement ceremonies, including a parade through New York City, were held on 28 April 1950 and Kinkaid formally retired two days later.

In December 1946, it was announced that Halsey, Spruance and Turner had been awarded the Army Distinguished Service Medal. A message soon arrived from MacArthur stating that he could not see why Kinkaid should not merit the same award, which had been recommended by Krueger during the war. The medal was duly presented by General Courtney Hodges in a ceremony on Governors Island on 10 April 1947. The Australian government chose to honor Kinkaid with an honorary Companion of the Order of the Bath, which was presented by the ambassador at a ceremony at the embassy in Washington on Australia Day, 26 January 1948. Kinkaid had already been created Grand Officer of the Order of Orange-Nassau by Queen Wilhelmina of the Netherlands in 1944. In March 1948, he was made a Grand Officer of the Order of Leopold and presented with the Croix de Guerre with Palm in a ceremony at the Belgian embassy in Washington, D.C.

He served as the naval representative with the National Security Training Commission from 1951 until it was abolished in 1957, and with the American Battle Monuments Commission for fifteen years, beginning in 1953. In this capacity, he attended the dedication of the Cambridge American Cemetery and Memorial, Brittany American Cemetery and Memorial, Rhone American Cemetery and Memorial, Manila American Cemetery and Memorial and the East Coast Memorial. He also paid a visit to Australia and New Zealand in 1951. Until 1961, he attended the annual reunions held to celebrate General MacArthur's birthday, 26 January, joining MacArthur and his old colleagues, including Krueger and Kenney.

=== Death and legacy ===
Kinkaid died at Bethesda Naval Hospital on 17 November 1972 and was buried with military honors at Arlington National Cemetery on 21 November.

The Navy named a Spruance-class destroyer after him. USS Kinkaid was launched by his widow Helen at the Ingalls Shipbuilding Division of Litton Industries at Pascagoula, Mississippi, on 1 June 1974.

== Bibliography ==
- Ancell, R. Manning; Miller, Christine (1996). The Biographical Dictionary of World War II Generals and Flag Officers: The US Armed Forces. Westport, Connecticut: Greenwood Press. ISBN 978-0-313-29546-1. OCLC 33862161.
- Barbey, Daniel E. (1969). MacArthur's Amphibious Navy: Seventh Amphibious Force Operations, 1943–1945. Annapolis, Maryland: United States Naval Institute. OCLC 52066.
- Blair, Clay (1975). Silent Victory: The U.S. Submarine War Against Japan. Philadelphia, Pennsylvania: Lippincott. ISBN 978-0-397-00753-0. OCLC 821363.
- Cherpak, E. M., ed. (2004). The Memoirs of Admiral H. Kent Hewitt. Newport, Rhode Island: Naval War College Press. ISBN 978-1-884733-20-8. OCLC 474158793.
- Frank, Benis M.; Shaw, Henry I Jr. (1968). Volume V: Victory and Occupation (PDF). History of U.S. Marine Corps Operations in World War II. Nashville, Tennessee: The Battery Press. OCLC 464448015.
- Goldstein, Donald M.; Dillon, Katherin V. (1992). The Williwaw War: The Arkansas National Guard In the Aleutians In World War II. Fayetville: University of Arkansas Press.
- Hoyt, Edwin P. (1989). MacArthur's Navy: The Seventh Fleet and the Battle for the Philippines. New York, New York: Orion Books. ISBN 978-0-517-56769-2. OCLC 19520893.
- Kinkaid, Thomas C. (1921). "Probability and Accuracy of Gun Fire". Proceedings (October 1921). Annapolis, Maryland: United States Naval Institute: 1543–1552.
- — (1922). "Naval Corps, Specialization and Efficiency". Proceedings (September 1922). Annapolis, Maryland: United States Naval Institute: 1491–1500.
- Leary, William M., ed. (1988). We Shall Return!: MacArthur's Commanders and the Defeat of Japan, 1942–1945. Lexington, Kentucky: University Press of Kentucky. ISBN 978-0-8131-9105-8. OCLC 17483104.
- Lundstrom, John B. (1976). The First South Pacific Campaign: Pacific Fleet Strategy December 1941 – June 1942. Annapolis, Maryland: Naval Institute Press. ISBN 978-0-87021-185-0.
- — (1984). The First Team: Pacific Naval Air Combat from Pearl Harbor to Midway. Annapolis, Maryland: Naval Institute Press. ISBN 978-1-59114-471-7.
- — (1994). First Team and the Guadalcanal Campaign: Naval Fighter Combat from August to November 1942. Annapolis, Maryland: Naval Institute Press. ISBN 978-1-59114-472-4.
- — (2006). Black Shoe Carrier Admiral: Frank Jack Fletcher at Coral Sea, Midway, and Guadalcanal. Annapolis, Maryland: Naval Institute Press. ISBN 978-1-59114-475-5.
- Morison, Samuel Eliot (1948). The Struggle for Guadalcanal, August 1942 – February 1943. History of United States Naval Operations in World War II. Boston, Massachusetts: Little, Brown and Company. OCLC 18472361.
- — (1949). Coral Sea, Midway and Submarine Actions, May 1942 – August 1942. History of United States Naval Operations in World War II. Boston, Massachusetts: Little, Brown and Company. OCLC 499680479.
- — (1950). Breaking the Bismarcks Barrier: 22 July 1942–1 May 1944. History of United States Naval Operations in World War II. Boston, Massachusetts: Little, Brown and Company. OCLC 10310299.
- — (1951). The Aleutians, Gilberts and Marshalls, June 1942 – April 1944. History of United States Naval Operations in World War II. Boston, Massachusetts: Little, Brown and Company. OCLC 52192323.
- — (1953). New Guinea and the Marianas, March 1944 – August 1944. History of United States Naval Operations in World War II. Boston, Massachusetts: Little, Brown and Company. OCLC 60250702.
- — (1958). Leyte, June 1944 – January 1945. History of United States Naval Operations in World War II. Boston, Massachusetts Kenya: Little, Brown and Company. OCLC 52204538.
- Reynolds, Clark G. (1978). Famous American Admirals. Annapolis, Maryland: Naval Institute Press. ISBN 978-1-55750-006-9. OCLC 3912797.
- Wheeler, Gerald E. (1994). Kinkaid of the Seventh Fleet: A Biography of Admiral Thomas C. Kinkaid, U.S. Navy. Washington, D.C.: Naval Historical Center. ISBN 978-0-945274-26-1. OCLC 31078997.
