= Ralph Waldo Christie =

Rear Admiral of the United States Navy during World War II

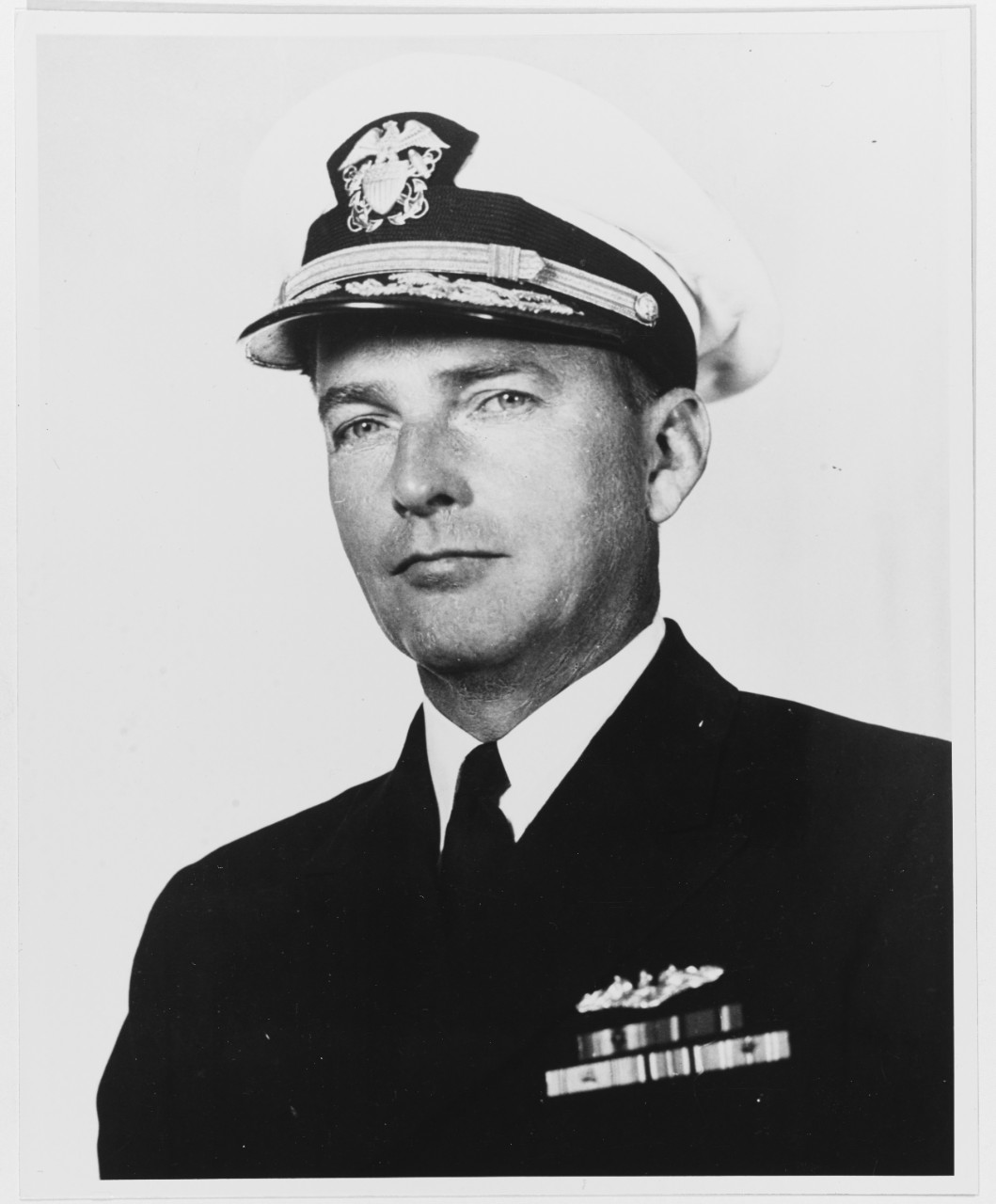
- Rear admiral Ralph W. Christie, USN
- Born: 30 August 1893; Somerville, Massachusetts, U.S.
- Died: 19 December 1987 (aged 94); Honolulu, Hawaii, U.S.
- Military career
- Allegiance: United States
- Branch: United States Navy
- Service years: 1915–1949
- Rank: Vice Admiral
- Commands: Submarines, Southwest Pacific Area; Task Force 42; Newport Torpedo Station; Submarine Division 15; USS S-17; USS S-1; USS R-6; USS Octopus
- Conflicts: World War I World War II
- Awards: Navy Distinguished Service Medal; Silver Star; Legion of Merit

Ralph Waldo Christie (30 August 1893 – 19 December 1987) was an admiral in the United States Navy who played a pivotal role in the development of torpedo technologies. During World War II, he commanded submarine operations out of the Australian ports of Brisbane and Fremantle.

A 1915 graduate of the United States Naval Academy, Christie served on a variety of warships beginning with the battleship New Jersey in 1915. He was trained in torpedo design and implementation and became one of the first members of the Submarine School at New London. In 1923 Christie graduated from the Massachusetts Institute of Technology with a Master's degree in Mechanical Engineering, specializing in torpedoes. During the 1920s, he was involved with project G-53, a highly secret program to develop a magnetic influence exploder for torpedoes. The result of this was the development of the Mark 6 exploder and the Mark 14 torpedo. Christie also developed a design for an oxygen torpedo, designated project G-49 or "Navol".

After the United States entered World War II, Christie was posted to Brisbane and commanded submarine operations during the Solomon Islands campaign. He then returned to the U.S. as Inspector of Ordnance at the Newport Torpedo Station. In January 1943, Christie returned to Australia as commander of submarine operations in Fremantle. Despite growing evidence of problems with the Mark 6 exploder and the Mark 14 torpedo, he remained convinced of their effectiveness. During 1944, he accompanied war patrols on the submarines USS Bowfin and USS Harder. In November 1944, Christie was relieved of command of submarine operations at Fremantle by Vice Admiral Thomas C. Kinkaid and returned to the United States, where he commanded the Puget Sound Navy Yard. He retired from the Navy in August 1949 with the rank of vice admiral.

== Early career ==
Ralph W. Christie was born in Somerville, Massachusetts on 30 August 1893. He graduated from the United States Naval Academy in 1915 and served on a variety of warships beginning with the battleship New Jersey. Aboard the cruiser Montana in 1916, he was trained in torpedo design and implementation. Christie was one of the first students of the Submarine School at New London. He went on to command the submarines USS Octopus in 1918, USS R-6 in 1920, USS S-1 in 1923 and USS S-17 in 1924. Christie served as Commander, Submarines at Cavite from 1925 to 1926. In 1923, he graduated from the Massachusetts Institute of Technology with a Master's degree in Mechanical Engineering, specializing in torpedoes.

=== Development of the Mark 6 magnetic exploder ===
In 1922, as Christie was completing his graduate studies, the Bureau of Ordnance initiated project G-53, a highly secret program to develop a magnetic influence exploder for torpedoes. In the summer of 1926, Christie became intimately involved in the project, and was substantially involved in the technical development of the weapon system. By 1926, the exploder was far enough advanced to permit its first test. On 8 May, the obsolete submarine USS L-8 was used as a target, and destroyed with an influence torpedo. Despite this early success, the influence exploder, which would become the Mark 6, needed significant refinement.

Christie urged the Navy Department to allocate a target ship for extensive field tests of the torpedo and exploder. The Chief of Naval Operations authorized the use of the obsolete destroyer USS Ericsson, but placed so many restrictions on its use, Newport was forced to decline the offer. As a result, neither the Mark 6 exploder nor the Mark 14 torpedo ever underwent a live test, and their shortcomings would not become apparent until the outbreak of hostilities. It would be twenty months before the problems were corrected, over Christie's objections.

=== Development of the oxygen torpedo ===
During the 1920s and 1930s, Christie carried out experimental work on an oxygen torpedo with the Ordnance Laboratory, in Alexandria, Virginia. Designated project G-49 or "Navol", this torpedo used hydrogen peroxide instead of compressed air. Christie's design had the experimental torpedo propel a 500 lb (230 kg) warhead at 50 kn (93 km/h; 58 mph) to a maximum range of 15,000 yd (14,000 m). The Navol design was subsequently designated Mark 16 for submarines and Mark 17 for surface ships. The hydrogen peroxide system was test fitted to a Mark 14 torpedo in the mid-1930s, where Christie's design propelled a 500 lb (230 kg) warhead to a range of 16,500 yd (15,100 m) at 46 kn (53 mph; 85 km/h; 53 mph).

Despite the promise of the design, many operational officers were opposed to the use of volatile hydrogen peroxide aboard ship. Ultimately, the Mark 16 went into limited production while work on the Mark 17 was suspended in 1941, but resumed in 1944. Admiral Ernest King favored focusing research efforts on electric torpedoes so work on the oxygen system was downgraded. As such, the U.S. Navy made no combat use of the oxygen torpedo design during the Second World War.

By May 1938, Christie was head of the Torpedo Section at BuOrd and involved in providing torpedoes to the fleet. He would take command of Newport Torpedo Station in 1943, shortly before the death of Admiral Robert English on 21 January 1943.

=== Other pre-war assignments ===
In 1939, Christie was given command of Submarine Division 15, consisting of all six Salmon-class submarines. By 1941, Germany and the United Kingdom were engaged in the Battle of the Atlantic. Although the United States was neutral, President Franklin D. Roosevelt ordered the U.S. Atlantic Fleet to enforce the Neutrality Patrol to assist UK-bound convoys. As part of secret agreements with Britain, the United States agreed to provide the former with submarines under Royal Navy control, should America enter the conflict. Admiral Richard S. Edwards, Commander, Submarines, Atlantic Fleet (ComSubLant), selected the now Captain Christie as tactical commander for the proposed submarine force in British waters. Christie wanted the new Tambor-class submarines to be assigned to the Atlantic Fleet, but was overruled by Admiral Harold R. Stark, who selected the older S and Barracuda classes instead. As war seemed increasingly likely toward the end of 1941, Christie placed his boats on full war footing.

== World War Two service ==
=== Brisbane ===
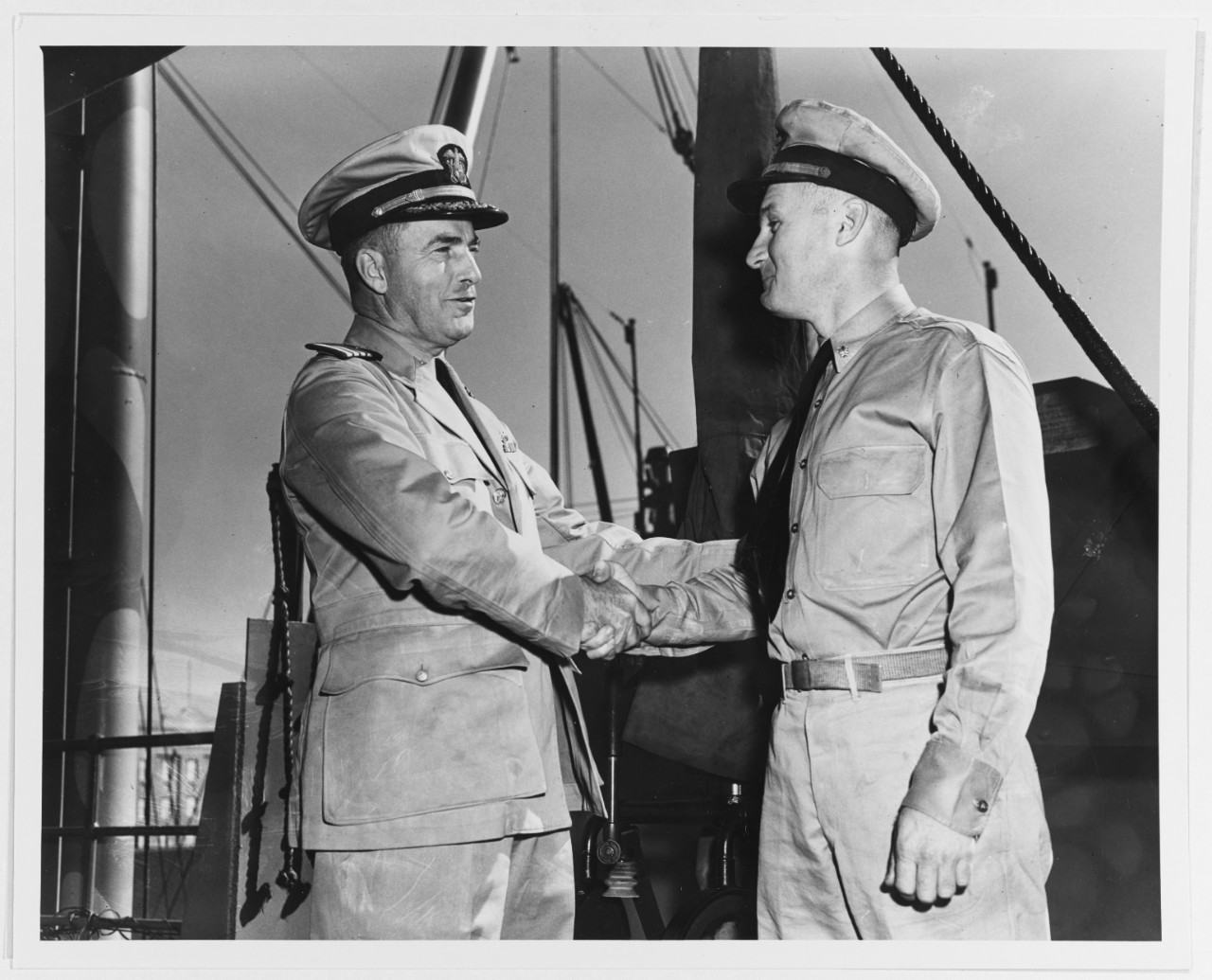
Captain Christie congratulates Lieutenant Commander John R. Moore, Commanding Officer of USS S-44 (SS-155), as he returned to this South Pacific base after a very successful week of patrol activity in August 1942.

At the outbreak of the Pacific War, remnants of the United States Asiatic Fleet fled to Australia, on orders from Washington. The S-boats from the Philippines were organized into a fighting force at Brisbane, and Admiral Ernest King ordered S-boats from the Atlantic Fleet to supplement the force in Australia. Christie went along, arriving in April 1942, just in time for the Battle of the Coral Sea. During the Solomon Islands campaign, he ordered his boats to patrol around harbors which, while being key points for shipping, also tended to be heavily patrolled by aircraft and anti-submarine craft. In step with then-current U.S. Navy submarine doctrine, he made capital ships the prime targets, rather than have his boats focus on merchant shipping.

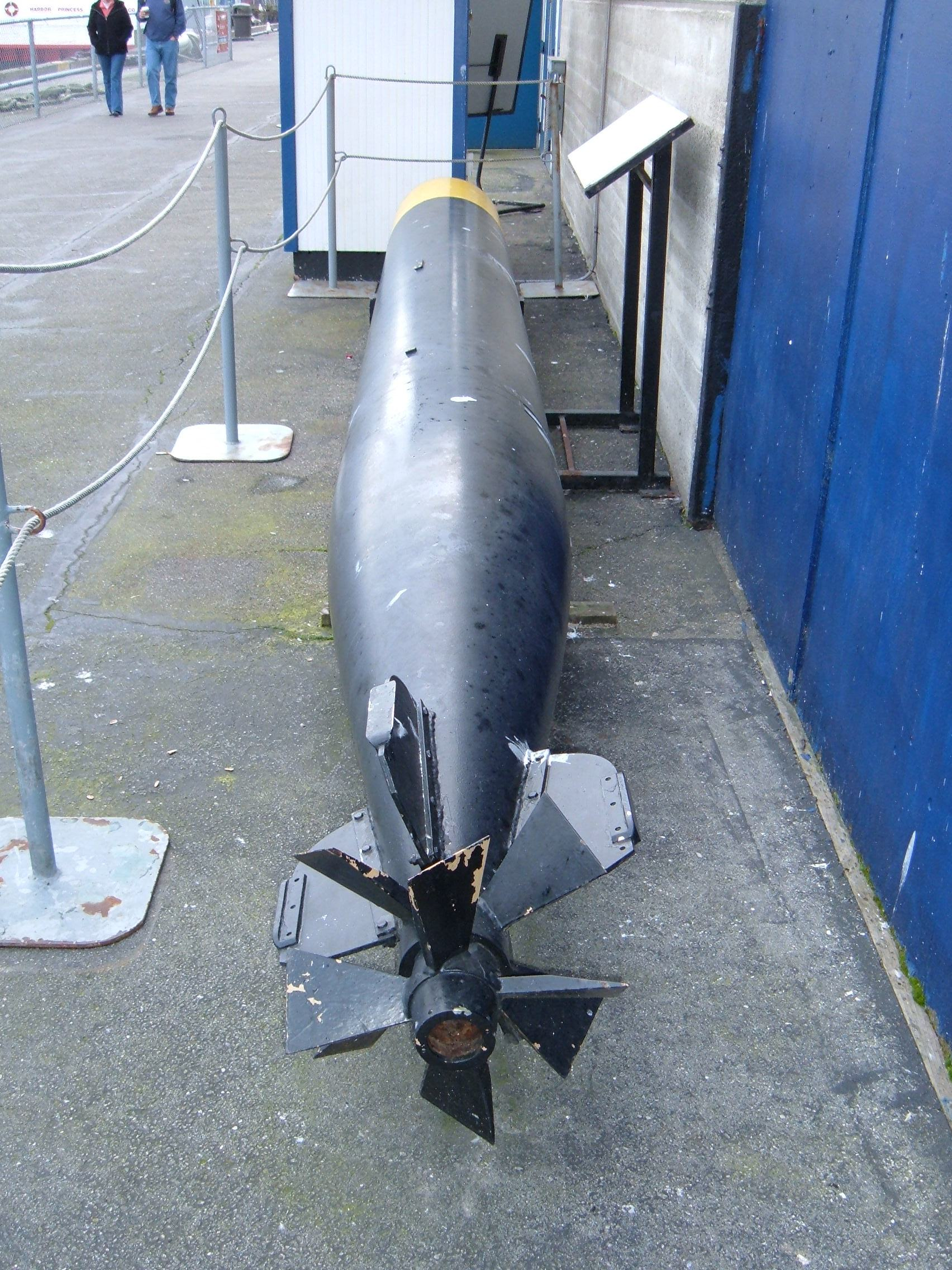
A Mark 14 torpedo

Almost as soon as the war began, submarine captains indicated there were problems with the Mark 14 torpedo and the influence feature of the Mark 6 exploder. Torpedoes would fail to explode, or explode prematurely. Despite these reports, Christie was not fully aware of the impact of the situation, because his S-boats used the older Mark 10 torpedo, with a contact-only piston. Christie acknowledged Mark 14s were running deeper than set, but attributed the failures to poor maintenance and errors on the part of the captains and crews. He was convinced the Mark 6 was satisfactory, and ordered all fleet boats to continue to use it. In November 1942, Christie was ordered to return to Newport as Inspector of Ordnance at the Torpedo Station. Newport had become a bottleneck for torpedo manufacture, and the Bureau of Ordnance wanted to advance development of the Mark 18 electric torpedo. Christie resisted leaving his command at Brisbane, but was considered of more use to resolve the torpedo issue. He was replaced by Captain James Fife. For his service at Brisbane, Christie was awarded the Legion of Merit.

Christie was promoted to rear admiral as part of his move back to Newport. In January 1943, however, Rear Admiral Robert English, Commander, Submarines, U.S. Pacific Fleet, was killed in a plane crash. Christie hoped to get the position but the job went to Rear Admiral Charles A. Lockwood, commander of submarine operations in Fremantle, and the Bureau of Personnel selected Christie to take over Lockwood's old command. Christie lobbied Vice Admiral Arthur 'Chips' Carpender, Douglas MacArthur's Commander Allied Naval Forces, to allow him to replace Fife as commander of the larger submarine force at Brisbane. Carpender refused, and Christie went on to Fremantle. Nevertheless, Christie continued to try for some time to take the Brisbane force under his control.

By the middle of 1943, Lockwood had received enough reports from submarine officers to convince him the Mark 6 was significantly flawed. On 24 June 1943, he formally ordered all submarines operating out of Pearl Harbor to deactivate the magnetic influence feature. However, Christie was still committed to the exploder, and ordered Fremantle boats to continue using the influence feature. Submarines operating between the two commands were required to either enable or disable it, depending on which command area they were in. This difference of opinion strained relations between the two admirals.

In November 1943, Carpender was replaced by Vice Admiral Thomas C. Kinkaid, who ordered the final deactivation of the Mark 6 in all combat commands. Christie abided by the order, commencing on 20 January 1944, but was still convinced the Mark 6 had potential. He had Commanders Chester Nimitz, Jr. and James McCallum continue technical studies of the Mark 6 and to develop improvements, but these revised exploders were just as unreliable as the earlier versions.

=== Fremantle ===
It was common for Christie to greet a returning submarine at the pier, and to award decorations to the crew on the spot. This bypassed naval award boards, and annoyed Kinkaid and Lockwood, possibly because confirmation of sinkings was accomplished by Ultra, the reading of coded Japanese radio traffic, and news of awards given so quickly could constitute a security breach. Complicating the matter was the fact MacArthur awarded army decorations to naval personnel; like Christie, he took it upon himself to authorize the decorations rather than to go through the standard review procedures. These events compelled Kinkaid to forbid Christie to give pierside awards, and to keep Christie from recommending the award of army medals to navy personnel. These events would ultimately contribute to Christie's dismissal as Commander of Submarines in Fremantle.

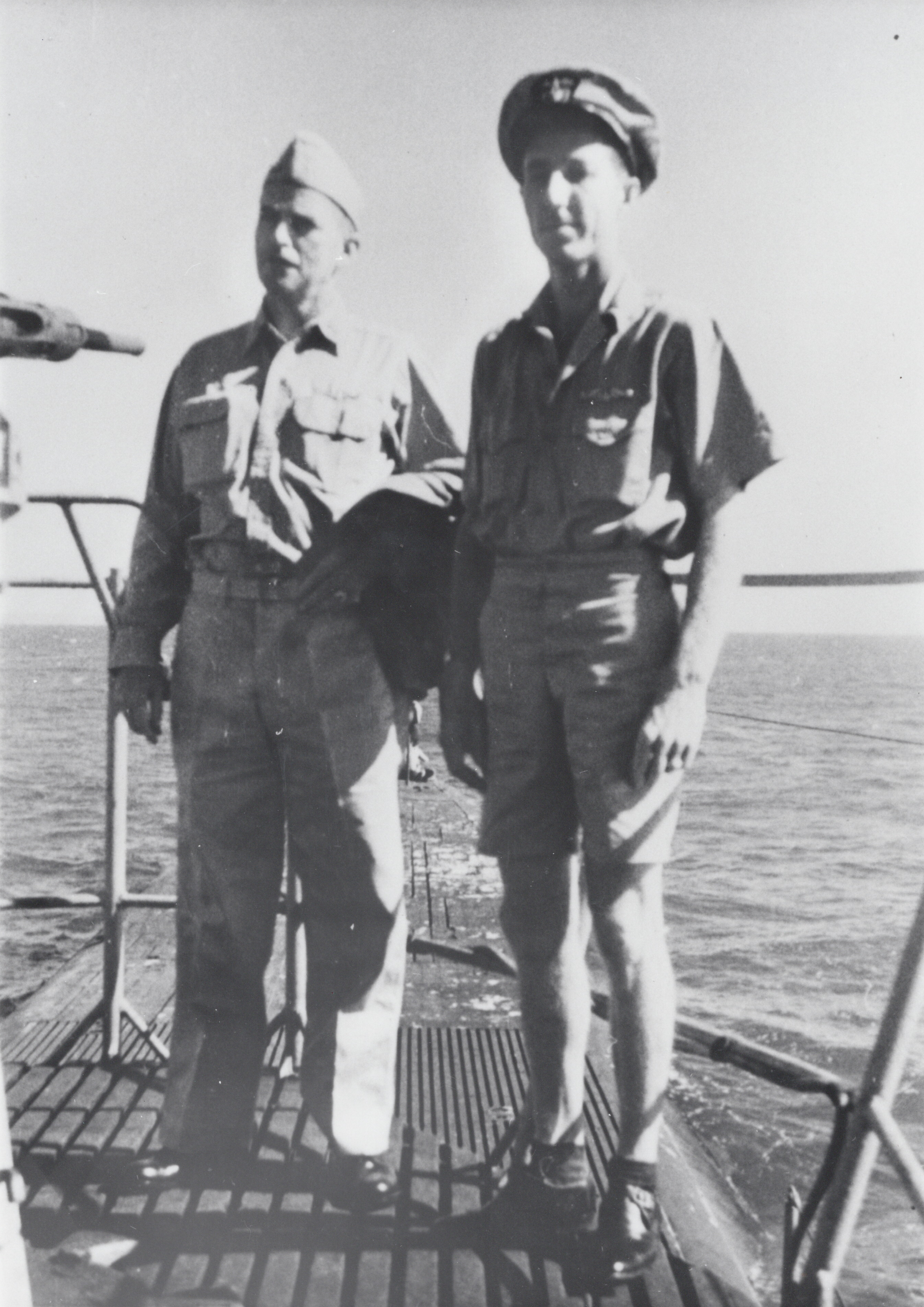
Christie (left) with LCDR Walter T. Griffith on USS Bowfin's third patrol.

In early 1944, Christie decided he wanted to make a war patrol and selected to ride with Walter T. Griffith in USS Bowfin. The admiral joined the boat on 29 January 1944 and, during the patrol, conducted standard duties such as standing watch. He departed Bowfin after an active 29-day patrol. In June 1944, Christie decided he wanted to make a second patrol, and selected USS Guitarro. However, that boat was having engine troubles, so Christie decided to go in USS Harder, commanded by Samuel D. Dealey. Dealey had just finished up Harder's epic fifth war patrol, in which he was credited with sinking five Japanese destroyers (reduced post-war to three destroyers). Despite the fact the crew was exhausted, Dealey agreed to extend his fifth patrol and take Christie on board. When Harder returned to port on 3 July 1944, Christie was concerned about its commander. Dealey was one of the leading submarine skippers but, having completed five war patrols, he was showing signs of strain. The admiral believed Dealey should step down from command of Harder, but Dealey felt he should make one more patrol before leaving the boat.

After Christie's return from his second combat patrol, Admiral Chester Nimitz recommended he and Lockwood meet in Brisbane and discuss joint submarine operations. During the visit, Lockwood and Christie discussed technical issues, as well as the establishment of advanced bases in Mios Woendi and Saipan. However, the meeting also resulted in some kind of personal rift between the two men. They had already clashed over the Mark 6 exploder and the Mark 14 torpedo, and some of Lockwood's staff believed Christie's ride in Harder was a risky and unnecessary stunt. After meeting with Lockwood, Christie met with MacArthur and related the events of Dealey's fifth war patrol to the general. MacArthur then decided to award Dealey a Distinguished Service Cross, and Christie the Silver Star. Additionally at this meeting, Christie found out his earlier recommendation for an army decoration to Griffith had apparently been blocked by Kinkaid. Despite Kinkaid's order regarding army decorations, MacArthur insisted on granting medals to the two men. Although Christie did not request the decorations, he was put on the spot and felt compelled to report the entire affair to Kinkaid. In the end, the general awarded the medals, displeasing Kinkaid.

On 5 August, Dealey took Harder out for a sixth patrol. His former executive officer, Frank C. "Tiny" Lynch, believed Dealey was mentally exhausted. Christie also had reservations, but Dealey seemed to recuperate while Harder was being refitted in port. The admiral therefore allowed Dealey to retain command. On 24 August, Harder was sunk with all hands off Dasol Bay. Dealey's loss was a great shock to Christie, and the event worsened his relationship with Kinkaid. Christie recommended Dealey for the Medal of Honor for Harder's fifth patrol and the supposed sinking of five Japanese destroyers. Kinkaid turned down the recommendation on the grounds Dealey had already received the Distinguished Service Cross for the same patrol. Christie was angered by this, and sent dispatches to Admiral Edwards, MacArthur, and Kinkaid himself. The radio dispatch to Kinkaid was sent in a low-grade code that was easily decipherable; it criticized Kinkaid and urged him to reconsider. The message was so blunt and public, it was viewed as bordering on insubordination.

In October and November 1944, Christie received intelligence regarding German plans to operate a wolfpack of U-boats in Australian waters. He directed Allied forces to detect and eliminate the threat, resulting in the Dutch submarine Zwaardvisch (swordfish) sinking U-168 on 6 October near Surabaya and USS Flounder's sinking of U-537 on 10 November near the northern end of the Lombok Strait. Another U-boat disappeared en route while a fourth, U-862, evaded searchers to slip around the south coast of Australia and sink a Liberty ship south of Sydney in late December.

In November 1944, Kinkaid relieved Christie of command of submarine operations at Fremantle, and assigned the position to Fife commencing 30 December. Although no specific reason was given, Christie was convinced it was because he pushed Kinkaid too hard for Dealey's Medal of Honor, and for his process of awarding decorations in general. However, Christie's losses, which included Dealey and Kinkaid's nephew, Lieutenant Commander Manning Kimmel in USS Robalo in July 1944, may have also influenced Kinkaid's decision.

Christie returned to the United States, and went on to command Puget Sound Navy Yard. Now that he was no longer under Kinkaid's command, Christie renewed his push to get Dealey awarded the Medal of Honor, this time by getting the endorsement for the decoration from MacArthur. The general agreed, and Dealey was posthumously awarded the medal.

== Post-war career ==
After the war, Christie attempted to get command of operations for Atlantic submarines, but that job went to James Fife instead. However, Christie was given command of naval forces in the Philippines. He retired from the Navy on 1 August 1949, with tombstone promotion to the rank of vice admiral. He sold life insurance and dabbled in other ventures for some time. In his final years, he lived on the west coast of the United States and in Hawaii. Christie died in Honolulu, Hawaii on 19 December 1987 at the age of 94. His papers are in the Library of Congress.

== Bibliography ==
- Ancell, R. Manning; Miller, Christine (1996), The Biographical Dictionary of World War II Generals and Flag Officers: The US Armed Forces, Westport, Connecticut: Greenwood Press, ISBN 0-313-29546-8, OCLC 33862161
- Blair, Clay Jr. (1975), Silent Victory: The U.S. Submarine War Against Japan, Philadelphia: Lippincott, ISBN 0-397-00753-1, OCLC 821363
- Newpower, Anthony (2006), Iron Men and Tin Fish: The Race to Build a Better Torpedo during World War II, Praeger Security International, ISBN 0-275-99032-X
- Sturma, Michael (2006), Death at a Distance: The Loss of the Legendary USS Harder, US Naval Institute Press, ISBN 1-59114-845-6, OCLC 62782222
