= Manning Kimmel =

United States Navy submarine officer (1913–1944)

Manning Marius Kimmel
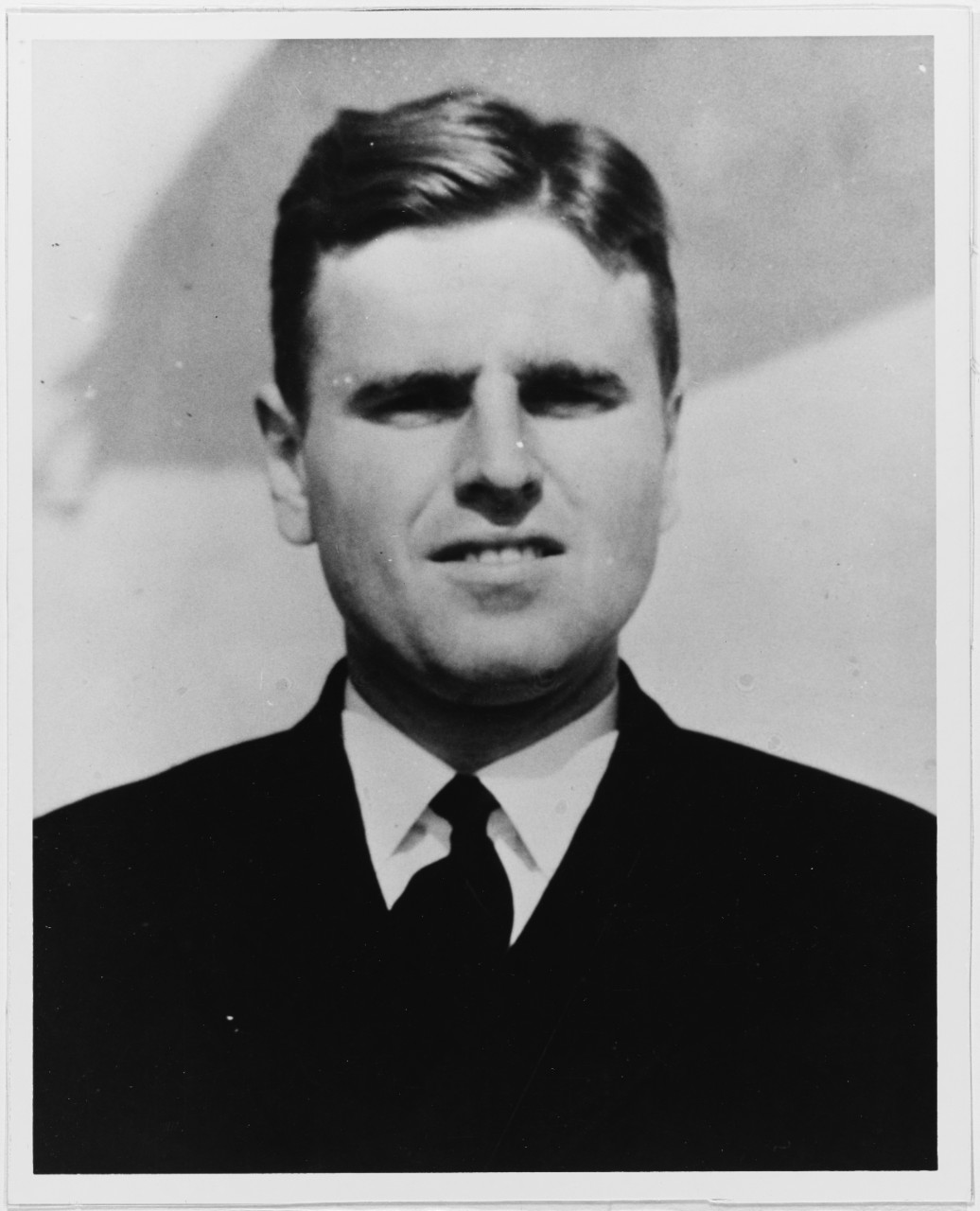
- Lieutenant Commander Manning Kimmel, USN
- Born: April 22, 1913; Washington, D.C., U.S.
- Died: around July 26, 1944 (aged 31); On or near Palawan, Philippines
- Military career
- Allegiance: United States of America
- Branch: United States Navy
- Service years: 1935–1944
- Rank: Lieutenant Commander
- Commands: USS Robalo
- Conflicts: World War II
- Awards: Silver Star; Purple Heart

Manning Marius Kimmel (April 22, 1913 – on or around July 26, 1944) was a United States Navy submarine officer in World War II and the son of Admiral Husband E. Kimmel. He served as both junior and executive officer on several submarines, and finally assumed command of USS Robalo as a lieutenant commander. Kimmel was reportedly killed when Robalo was sunk off the island of Palawan. However, the exact circumstances surrounding his death remain unclear.

== Biography ==
Manning Kimmel was born in Washington, D.C., on April 22, 1913. His father was Admiral Husband E. Kimmel, who eventually became the commander of the Pacific Fleet at the time of the attack by the Japanese at Pearl Harbor, Hawaii. His mother was Dorothy Kinkaid (1890–1975), sister of Admiral Thomas C. Kinkaid.

The younger Kimmel followed his father's footsteps and entered the United States Naval Academy, graduating in June 1935. Ensign Kimmel's first assignment was aboard the battleship USS Mississippi. He subsequently went to Groton, Connecticut in 1938 for submarine training. Upon completion of his training, Kimmel was assigned as a junior officer aboard the submarine S-39 and served aboard her until the middle of 1941.

The now-Lieutenant Kimmel was transferred to the new Gato-class submarine USS Drum. At the outbreak of hostilities, just after which his father was relieved of his command, Drum operated off the east coast of Honshū where Kimmel had his first formal experience with combat. At the end of 1942, Kimmel became executive officer of Drum.

In 1943, Kimmel became executive officer aboard a new Gato-class submarine, USS Raton, and served in that role until 1944.

In May 1944, Admiral Ralph Waldo Christie, commander of submarine operations out of Perth-Fremantle, relieved Stephen Ambruster of command of the Gato-class submarine USS Robalo and selected Lieutenant Commander Kimmel to be her new skipper.

Kimmel took Robalo to the South China Sea to operate against tanker traffic trying to supply the Japanese fleet at Tawi Tawi. During one attack against a target, Robalo was attacked by a Japanese plane. Bombs from the plane severely damaged the submarine's periscopes and conning tower, and wrecked her radar. When diving to escape the aircraft, the main induction flooded and the boat plunged towards the bottom until Kimmel stopped her descent at 350 feet. Despite the damage, Kimmel insisted the Robalo remain on patrol.

Admiral Christie was concerned that Kimmel was being overly aggressive, and submarine commander Herber "Tex" McLean commented on Robalo's patrol, "Anybody else would have come home long before. I worried that Kimmel was a little too anxious to put the name of Kimmel high in Navy annals." But not only was Kimmel the son of the former commander of the Pacific Fleet; he was also the nephew of Admiral Thomas C. Kinkaid, so Christie took no action.

Repairs to Robalo were eventually made, and when they were complete, Kimmel was ordered to take Robalo to Indochina via the Balabac Strait, separating Palawan and Borneo. Christie had received reports of Japanese minefields in the Balabac Strait, but a number of submarines, including Robalo on her first patrol, successfully transited the body of water. Kimmel had received information about the minefields and was given instructions how to safely navigate the area.

On July 3, 1944, Robalo received an Ultra communiqué, and attempted to intercept a Fuso-class battleship. Kimmel sent off a contact report, which was the last message ever received from him. On the night of July 26, while on the surface, Robalo apparently strayed off course, struck a mine and sank. An unknown number of survivors, possibly as many as seven, managed to make it ashore on Palawan. But before they could make contact with Filipino guerrillas, they were captured by Japanese forces.

The prisoners were taken to Puerto Princesa prison camp where, a few days later, one of the survivors passed a note out of a cell window. The note was retrieved by a U.S. Army prisoner who was on a work detail. The note was eventually smuggled to the wife of a guerrilla leader, Dr. Mendoza, who then forwarded the information to Admiral Ralph Christie. Ultimately, none of the crew members survived; some or all of them may have been murdered by the Japanese or perished while being transported to a different location. It has been proposed that some of the Robalo survivors were taken aboard one or more destroyers sometime around August 15. The exact fate of the four survivors is unknown.

Admiral Christie informed the Kimmel family at the time that Manning had gone down with his ship. However, Christie confided after the war that he had received intelligence that gave a different account of Kimmel's death, an account which he intentionally withheld for the sake of the family. According to this alternative account, Kimmel survived the sinking. However, a few days after the crew was captured, some American aircraft attacked Japanese installations on Palawan. The Japanese reportedly flew into a rage at the attack, pushed Kimmel and several other Robalo crew members into a ditch, doused them with gasoline, and set them afire. (Note: The Palawan Massacre of US POWS by the Japanese did occur in this fashion in Puerto Princesa City—but that happened December 14, 1944, not July 1944.) After Admiral Christie received the report of Manning Kimmel's death, he had Kimmel's brother, Thomas, pulled from combat duty.

In later years, Admiral Kimmel had a third son, Manning M. Kimmel III. In 1994 Manning III's two sons, South Carolina broadcaster Manning Kimmel IV (born 1948), and his brother Thomas appeared before a Senate subcommittee, attempting to have Admiral Kimmel restored to four-star rank and exonerated of accusations of mismanagement of the naval response to the Japanese attack on Pearl Harbor. As of 2017 their efforts to restore Admiral Kimmel's rank have been unsuccessful.

== See also ==
- List of people who disappeared mysteriously: post-1970
