= USS S-17 =

S-class submarine of the United States

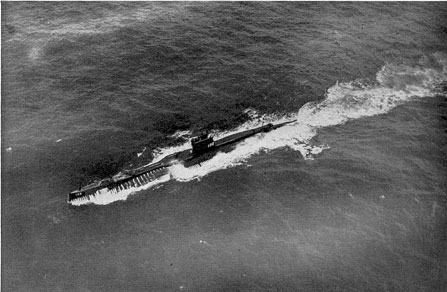
- USS S-17 (SS-122), underway July 1944, off of New London, Connecticut

History

United States
- Name: S-17
- Builder: Lake Torpedo Boat Company, Bridgeport, Connecticut
- Cost: $1,020,829.09 (hull and machinery)
- Laid down: 19 March 1918
- Launched: 22 May 1920
- Sponsored by: Mrs. Louise Thomas
- Commissioned: 1 March 1921
- Decommissioned: 29 March 1935
- Recommissioned: 16 December 1940
- Decommissioned: 4 October 1944
- Stricken: 13 November 1944
- Identification: Hull symbol: SS-122; Call sign: NIND
- Fate: Intentionally sunk, 5 April 1945

General characteristics
- Class & type: S-3-class submarine
- Displacement: 875 long tons (889 t) surfaced; 1,088 long tons (1,105 t) submerged
- Length: 231 feet (70 m)
- Beam: 21 ft 10 in (6.65 m)
- Draft: 13 ft 1 in (3.99 m)
- Installed power: 1,400 brake horsepower (1,044 kW) diesel; 1,200 hp (895 kW) electric
- Propulsion: 2 × Busch-Sulzer 6M150 diesel engines; 2 × Westinghouse Electric Corporation electric motors; 2 × 60-cell batteries; 2 × Propellers
- Speed: 15 knots (28 km/h; 17 mph) surfaced; 11 kn (20 km/h; 13 mph) submerged
- Test depth: 200 ft (61 m)
- Capacity: 36,950 US gallons (139,900 L; 30,770 imp gal) fuel
- Complement: 4 officers; 34 enlisted
- Armament: 4 × Bow 21-inch (533 mm) torpedo tubes (12 torpedoes); 1 × Stern 21-in torpedo tube (2 torpedoes); 1 × 4-inch (102 mm)/50-caliber

USS S-17 (SS-122) was an S-3-class, also referred to as a "Government"-type, submarine of the United States Navy.

== Design ==
The "Government"-type had a length of 231 feet (70.4 m) overall, a beam of 21 ft 10 in (6.7 m), and a mean draft of 13 ft 1 in (4.0 m). They displaced 875 long tons (889 t) on the surface and 1,088 long tons (1,105 t) submerged. All S-class submarines had a crew of 4 officers and 34 enlisted men, when first commissioned. They had a diving depth of 200 ft (61.0 m).

For surface running, the "Government"-type built by Lake Torpedo Boat Company, were powered by two 700-brake-horsepower (522 kW) Busch-Sulzer 6M150 diesel engines, each driving one propeller shaft. When submerged each propeller was driven by a 600-horsepower (447 kW) Westinghouse Electric Corporation electric motor. They could reach 15 knots (28 km/h; 17 mph) on the surface and 11 kn (20 km/h; 13 mph) underwater.

The boats were armed with four 21-inch (533 mm) torpedo tubes in the bow. They carried 8 reloads, for a total of twelve torpedoes. The "Government"-type submarines were also armed with a single 4 in (100 mm)/50 caliber deck gun.

== Construction ==
S-17's keel was laid down on 19 March 1918, by the Lake Torpedo Boat Company, in Bridgeport, Connecticut. She was launched on 22 May 1920, sponsoredby Mrs. Louise Thomas, and commissioned on 1 March 1921.

== Service history ==
=== 1921–1935 ===
Departing from New London, Connecticut, on 31 May 1921, S-17 sailed via the Panama Canal, California, the Territory of Hawaii, and Guam, to the Philippines, arriving at Cavite, Luzon, on 1 December.

In 1922, she sailed from Manila Bay, on 11 October, visited Hong Kong, from 14–28 October, and returned to Cavite, on 1 November. Sailing from Manila on 15 May 1923, S-17 visited Shanghai, Yantai, and Qinhuangdao, before returning via Wusong and Amoy, to Cavite, on 11 September. In the summer of 1924, she visited Shanghai, Qingdao, Yantai, and Qinhuangdao, before returning via Yantai and Amoy to Olongapo, Luzon, on 23 September. Departing Cavite, on 29 October, she arrived at the Mare Island Navy Yard, California, on 31 December.

Remaining at Mare Island in 1925 and 1926, she operated along the California coast, in 1927, mainly at Mare Island, San Diego, and San Pedro Submarine Base, San Pedro, Los Angeles.

From February 1928 into December 1934, S-17 served in the Panama Canal area. Departing from Coco Solo, on 10 December 1934, S-17 was decommissioned on 29 March 1935, at the Philadelphia Navy Yard.

=== 1940–1944 ===
S-17 was recommissioned on 16 December 1940. After voyages to Bermuda, S-17 operated in the Panama Canal area, from December 1941 to February 1942.

On 28 February 1942, she was operating at periscope depth when a United States Marine Corps plane dropped a 100-pound (45.4 kg) bomb targeting her periscope. Later in the day the same, or a different Marine Corps, plane dropped another 100-lb bomb, that landed within 50 yards (46 m) of her, while she was on the surface. S-17 suffered no damage or casualties in either incident.

S-17 operated from Saint Thomas, in the US Virgin Islands, in March 1942, and in the Panama Canal area, again from April to August 1942.

At 14:20, on 4 August 1942, a US plane attacked her at 11°34′N 078°36′W, with four 500-pound (227 kg) depth charges, while she was operating on the surface in the Caribbean Sea, inflicting damage that prevented her from diving. S-17's crew identified the attacking aircraft as a US Army Air Forces B-25 Mitchell bomber, and one source describes it as a US Navy PV-1 Ventura patrol bomber, due to both aircraft having a twin tail, twin engine configuration, but an official report on the incident identifies the plane as a US Army Air Forces B-18 Bolo bomber, which is actually a single tail fin, twin engine plane. S-17 arrived at Coco Solo, in the Panama Canal Zone, on 8 August 1942, for repairs.

S-17 operated from New London, from September 1942 to July 1944. Her cruises from New London, often included operations in Casco Bay, Maine.

== Fate ==
S-17 was decommissioned on 4 October 1944, and struck from the Naval Vessel Register on 13 November 1944. She was intentionally sunk on 5 April 1945.

== In literature ==
A fictional USS S-17 appears in Edward L. Beach's, 1955 novel, Run Silent, Run Deep.

== Awards ==
- American Defense Service Medal
- American Campaign Medal
- World War II Victory Medal

== Bibliography ==
- "Table 21 - Ships on Navy List June 30, 1919". Congressional Serial Set. U.S. Government Printing Office: 770. 1921.
- Friedman, Norman (1995). U.S. Submarines Through 1945: An Illustrated Design History. Annapolis, Maryland: Naval Institute Press. ISBN 1-55750-263-3.
- Mohl, Michael. "S-17 (SS-122)". Navsource.net.
- Hall, Anne Martin (1925). Ships of the United States navy and their sponsors, 1913-1923.
- "S-17". Dictionary of American Naval Fighting Ships. Navy Department, Naval History and Heritage Command. 1 September 2015. This article incorporates text from this source, which is in the public domain.
- Hedman, Ric; Johnston, David (22 October 2025). "S-14 through S-17". PigBoats.com.
- Hinman, Charles R.; Campbell, Douglas E. (2019). The Submarine Has No Friends: Friendly Fire Incidents Involving U.S. Submarines During World War II. Syneca Research Group, Inc. ISBN 978-0-359-76906-3.
- Campbell, Douglas E. (2011). USS Dorado (SS-284): On Eternal Patrol. ISBN 978-1-257-95155-0.
