= USS Robalo =

Gato-class submarine sunk in 1944

Coordinates: 7°56.45′N 117°15.85′E

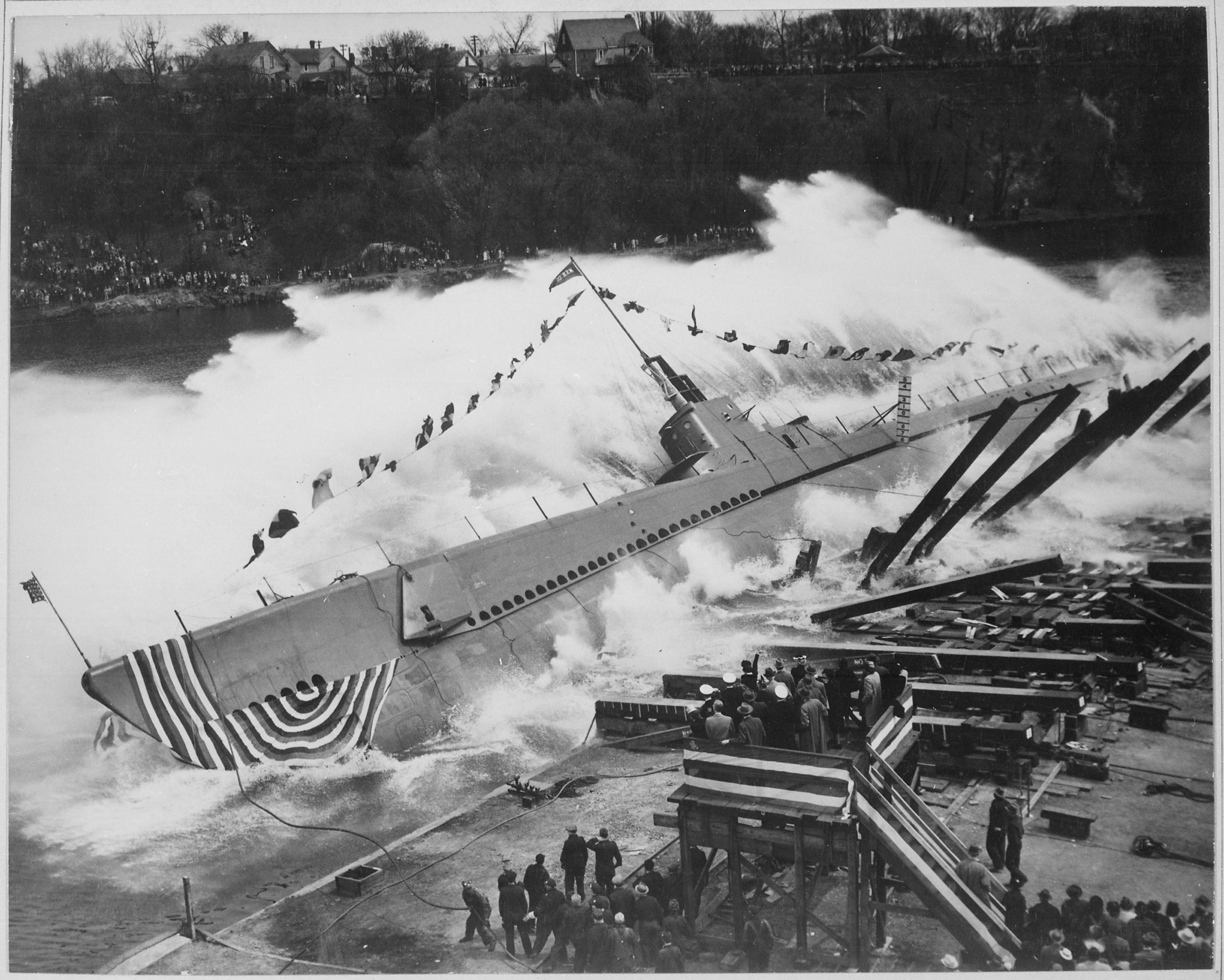
- USS Robalo (SS-273) at launch, and just after

History

United States
- Name: Robalo
- Namesake: Common snook or robalo
- Builder: Manitowoc Shipbuilding Company, Manitowoc, Wisconsin
- Laid down: 24 October 1942
- Launched: 9 May 1943
- Sponsored by: Mrs. E. S. Root
- Commissioned: 28 September 1943
- Stricken: 16 September 1944
- Fate: Sunk by mine 26 July 1944

General characteristics
- Class & type: Gato-class diesel-electric submarine
- Displacement: 1,525 tons (1,549 t) surfaced; 2,424 tons (2,460 t) submerged
- Length: 311 ft 9 in (95.02 m)
- Beam: 27 ft 3 in (8.31 m)
- Draft: 17 ft 0 in (5.18 m) maximum
- Propulsion: 4 × General Motors Model 16-248 V16 Diesel engines driving electric generators; 2 × 126-cell Sargo batteries; 4 × high-speed General Electric electric motors with reduction gears; two propellers; 5,400 shp (4.0 MW) surfaced; 2,740 shp (2.0 MW) submerged
- Speed: 21 knots (39 km/h) surfaced; 9 knots (17 km/h) submerged
- Range: 11,000 nmi (20,000 km) surfaced at 10 knots (19 km/h)
- Endurance: 48 hours at 2 knots (4 km/h) submerged; 75 days on patrol
- Test depth: 300 ft (90 m)
- Complement: 6 officers, 54 enlisted
- Armament: 10 × 21-inch (533 mm) torpedo tubes; 6 forward, 4 aft; 24 torpedoes; 1 × 3-inch (76 mm) / 50 caliber deck gun; Bofors 40 mm and Oerlikon 20 mm cannon

USS Robalo (SS-273), a Gato-class submarine, was the only ship of the United States Navy to be named for the róbalo or common snook.

== Construction and commissioning ==
Robalo′s keel was laid down on 24 October 1942 by the Manitowoc Shipbuilding Company at [Manitowoc, Wisconsin. She was launched on 9 May 1943, sponsored by Mrs. E. S. Root, and commissioned on 28 September 1943.

== First patrol ==
After passage by inland waterways and being floated down the Mississippi River, Robalo deployed to the Pacific. On her first war patrol (under the leadership of Commander Stephen Ambruster, Annapolis class of 1928), she sortied from Pearl Harbor, hunting Japanese ships west of the Philippines. On 12 February 1944, Armbruster reported seeing a large, two-masted sailboat. There, en route to her new station in Fremantle submarine base, Western Australia, she had an encounter with enemy vessels; on 13 February 1944 east of the Verde Island Passage, the Robalo had come across a convoy of two large ships escorted by a minesweeper, which dropped 13 depth charges and fired twice at the submarine with a deck gun; although USS Robalo is "credited" with damaging a large freighter, firing four torpedoes at 3,100 yards (2,800 m), in fact the attack was unsuccessful and no enemy vessels were damaged or sunk. She spent 36 of her 57-day mission submerged. When she arrived, her commanding officer was summarily relieved by Admiral Christie and replaced with Manning Kimmel (class of 1935).

In March 1944, Christie (based on Ultra intelligence) feared surprise from a strong Japanese force. When Chester W. Nimitz, Jr. in USS Haddo (SS-255), made contact on his SJ radar and reported "many large ships", Christie scrambled to respond. Robalo, along with USS Flasher (SS-249), USS Hoe (SS-258), USS Hake (SS-256), and USS Redfin (SS-272), all ran to intercept. No attack ever materialized.

== Second patrol ==
For her second patrol, Robalo went to the South China Sea, assigned to interdict Japanese tanker traffic from French Indochina to the fleet anchorage at Tawi Tawi. On 24 April 1944 off Indochina, she was bombed by a Japanese antisubmarine aircraft, suffering shattered and flooded periscopes and loss of radar, while taking a harrowing plunge to 350 feet (110 m) after her main induction valve was improperly closed (a casualty frighteningly reminiscent of Squalus) in diving to escape. Robalo had been seen by Japanese aircraft carrier Kaiyō while escorting convoy Hi-58, which resulted in Robalo being damaged 24 April 1944. One of the ships that escaped damage from Robalo was the Mayasan Maru. On a "wildly aggressive patrol" lasting 51 days, Robalo fired 20 torpedoes in four attacks. In regard to the four claims by Robalo, on 3 May 1944, six torpedoes against a 4000-ton freighter (no damage); 8 May 1944, four torpedoes against a 1900-ton submarine (no damage); 17 May 1944, six torpedoes against a 7500-ton tanker (one hit) and four torpedoes against a 1500-ton destroyer (no damage). She was credited with sinking a 7500-ton tanker, which was not confirmed postwar by JANAC. When she returned to Fremantle, Captain "Tex" McLean (commanding Subron 16) and Admiral Christie both considered relieving Robalo's skipper for his own safety.

== Third patrol ==
Robalo departed Fremantle on 22 June 1944 on her third war patrol. She set a course for the South China Sea to conduct her patrol in the vicinity of the Natuna Islands. After transiting Makassar Strait and Balabac Strait (which was well-known to be mined), she was scheduled to arrive on station about 6 July and remain until dark on 2 August 1944. On 2 July, a contact report stated Robalo had sighted a Fusō-class battleship, with air cover and two destroyers for escort, just east of Borneo. No other messages were ever received from the submarine, and when she did not return from patrol, she was presumed lost.

Robalo was stricken from the Naval Vessel Register on 16 September 1944.

== Honors and awards ==
Robalo earned two battle stars for World War II service.

== Fate of survivors ==
On 2 August, a note was handed from the cell window of the Kempei Tai military prison on Palawan Island in the Philippines, to Ed Petry, an American prisoner-of-war from the Puerto Princesa Prison Camp who was passing by. The note was, in turn, given to Yeoman Second Class Hubert D. Hough, who was also a prisoner at the camp. He contacted Trinidad Mendoza (Red Hankie), wife of guerrilla leader Dr. Mendoza, who had the Coastwatchers radio General MacArthur and Admiral Ralph Christie in Australia.

From these sources, it was concluded Robalo was sunk on 26 July 1944, 2 nautical miles (3.7 km; 2.3 mi) off the western coast of Palawan Island from an explosion in the vicinity of her after battery, probably caused by an enemy mine. Four men swam ashore and made their way through the jungles to a small barrier northwest of the Puerto Princesa Prison Camp, where Japanese Military Police captured them and jailed them for guerrilla activities. On 15 August, they were evacuated by a Japanese destroyer and never heard from again. The exact fate of the survivors is unknown.

Though Admiral Christie knew better, for morale reasons, all hands were reported as having gone down with the boat, but other prisoners on Palawan reported that the boat's skipper, Lieutenant Commander Manning Kimmel, son of Admiral Husband Kimmel, was one of the survivors. After an air strike on Palawan, the Japanese were so angered that they pushed Kimmel and the other prisoners into a ditch, poured in gasoline, and burned them alive. This incident was reported by Clay Blair Jr., a submarine veteran of the war and author of the definitive work Silent Victory: The US Submarine War Against Japan (see Volume 2, pp660–662 for details).

== Discovery ==
The wreckage of the Robalo was found by the Sea Scan Survey Team in May 2019 in the Balabac Strait off the east coast of Balabac Island at a depth of 70 meters (230 ft). Her identity was confirmed by the U. S. Navy.
