= USS Bullhead =

Submarine of the United States

USS Bullhead (SS-332)
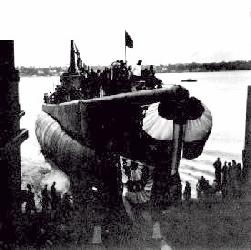

History

United States
- Name: Bullhead
- Builder: Electric Boat Company, Groton, Connecticut
- Laid down: 21 October 1943
- Launched: 16 July 1944
- Commissioned: 4 December 1944
- Fate: Sunk by Japanese aircraft in the Java Sea, 6 August 1945
- Notes: One of the last vessels to be sunk in World War II
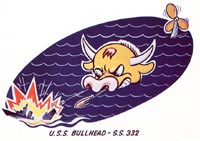
- Badge

General characteristics
- Class & type: Balao-class diesel-electric submarine
- Displacement: 1,526 long tons (1,550 t) surfaced; 2,424 long tons (2,463 t) submerged
- Length: 311 ft 9 in (95.02 m)
- Beam: 27 ft 3 in (8.31 m)
- Draft: 16 ft 10 in (5.13 m) maximum
- Propulsion: 4 × General Motors Model 16-278A V16 diesel engines driving electrical generators; 2 × 126-cell Sargo batteries; 4 × high-speed General Electric electric motors with reduction gears; 2 × propellers; 5,400 shp (4.0 MW) surfaced; 2,740 shp (2.0 MW) submerged
- Speed: 20.25 knots (37.50 km/h; 23.30 mph) surfaced; 8.75 knots (16.21 km/h; 10.07 mph) submerged
- Range: 11,000 nmi (20,000 km; 13,000 mi) surfaced at 10 knots (19 km/h; 12 mph)
- Endurance: 48 hours at 2 knots (3.7 km/h; 2.3 mph) submerged; 75 days on patrol
- Test depth: 400 ft (120 m)
- Complement: 10 officers, 70–71 enlisted
- Armament: 10 × 21-inch (533 mm) torpedo tubes (six forward, four aft; 24 torpedoes); As built; 1 x 5 in (127 mm)/25 caliber deck gun; 1 x 40 mm Bofors antiaircraft cannon; 1 x 20 mm Oerlikon antiaircraft cannon; July 1945; 2 x 5 in (127 mm)/25 caliber deck guns; 2 x 40 mm Bofors antiaircraft cannons

USS Bullhead (SS-332), a Balao-class submarine, was the last United States Navy ship sunk by enemy action during World War II, probably on the same day that an atomic bomb was dropped on Hiroshima. She was the only ship of the United States Navy to be named for the bullhead (a name given to a number of large-headed bottom-dwelling fish, especially the catfish, miller's thumb, and sculpin).

== Construction and commissioning ==
Bullhead′s keel was laid down by the Electric Boat Company of Groton, Connecticut. She was launched on 16 July 1944 sponsored by Mrs. Grace Moody Doyle, wife of shipyard employee Howard R. Doyle who had won the privilege of naming the ship's sponsor in a special election. Commander Walter T. Griffith, who had previously made three successful war patrols as commander of Bowfin, was assigned as the new commanding officer for Bullhead. Griffith oversaw the submarines’ sea trials, and assembled Bullhead's new crew around four experienced sailors who had followed him from Bowfin. Bullhead was commissioned 4 December 1944 and spent the next three months doing shakedown training around Narragansett Bay, Key West, and the Panama Canal Zone before heading to Pearl Harbor and then Guam.

== Operations ==
=== First patrol ===
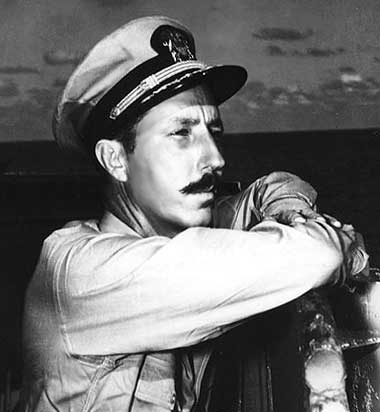
Commander Walter T. Griffith on the bridge of Bullhead during her first patrol

Prior to Bullhead departing on her first patrol, Commander, Submarines, Pacific (COMSUBPAC) Vice Admiral Charles A. Lockwood met with Commander Griffith and introduced him to war correspondent and Boston Globe reporter Martin Sheridan. Sheridan had just finished covering B-29 firebombing raids over Tokyo, and requested permission to go on a submarine war patrol from the office of Commander-in-Chief, U.S. Pacific Fleet (CINCPACFLT) Admiral Chester W. Nimitz. His request was approved, and Sheridan was allowed to go on Bullhead's first war patrol.

Bullhead departed Apra Harbor on 21 March 1945, bound for the South China Sea south of Formosa for lifeguard duty. With no airmen needing rescue, Bullhead received permission from COMSUBPAC to bombard the Japanese-occupied Pratas Island with deck guns on 31 March, and later on 24 April. On 8 April, Bullhead was nearly bombed by a U.S. Army Air Forces B-24 Liberator while travelling in a safety lane 80 nautical miles (150 km; 92 mi) southwest of Macao, China, which caused Griffith to demand an investigation into reports of Fifth Air Force planes improperly patrolling submarine safe zones. On 16 April, Bullhead rescued three airmen from a downed B-25 Mitchell that had already been picked up by Chinese fishermen in Bias Bay near Hong Kong. The risky rescue mission was conducted only four miles from the Japanese-occupied Chinese coast and in 12 fathom (72 feet) deep water, which led to Griffith ordering the preemptive destruction of secret decoding equipment onboard prior to going in for the rescue. On 19 April, an aircraft — possibly another U.S. Army Air Forces B-24 Liberator, although Sheridan reported it as being a Japanese floatplane — dropped two depth charges on Bullhead as she submerged in the South China Sea. The depth charges detonated as Bullhead reached 100 feet (30 m). She suffered no damage or casualties. Bullhead was ordered back to port on 25 April, but prior to leaving his patrol area, Griffith ordered that Bullhead's extra provisions be distributed to local fishermen. Bullhead finished her first patrol at Subic Bay, Philippines on 28 April having only sunk four mines with gunfire.

Upon the return from the patrol, Admiral James Fife Jr. was very pleased with Sheridan's reporting on submarine life and operations, and requested permission from Washington to send more war correspondents on submarine war patrols. However, Commander in Chief, United States Fleet (COMINCH) Fleet Admiral Ernest J. King sent the response: "WAR CORRESPONDENTS MAY NOT REPEAT MAY NOT GO ON SUBMARINE WAR PATROLS." Thus, Martin Sheridan was the only war correspondent to go on a submarine war patrol in World War II.

=== Second patrol ===
Following a few weeks of refitting and training, Bullhead left for her second patrol on 21 May 1945, transiting the South China Sea on her way towards the Gulf of Siam and Java Sea. The first four weeks saw very little action, save for sinking a 150 ton lugger off the coast of Thailand on 30 May. On 19 June, Bullhead conducted an extensive surface gun action off St. Nicholas Point, Java where she sunk or damaged several small coastal freighters. On 24 June, Bullhead spent several hours stalking an 8,000-10,000 ton ship with red cross markings that was operating suspiciously, but Griffith was denied permission from headquarters to attack it with torpedoes. (Note: Although the ship had large red cross markings, it was also following a zigzag course instead of a straight course and using red lights instead of white lights, both of which were in violation of instructions to mercy vessels.) The next day, Bullhead rescued 10 Javanese conscripts from a Japanese coastal freighter that it had sunk. After a Dutch-speaking Bullhead crew member interrogated one of the survivors, they were released. Bullhead finished her second patrol at Fremantle submarine base on 2 July, claiming 1,850 tons across 2 large and 2 small vessels as sunk, as well as 1,300 tons and 3 vessels damaged, all in gun actions.

=== Third patrol and sinking ===
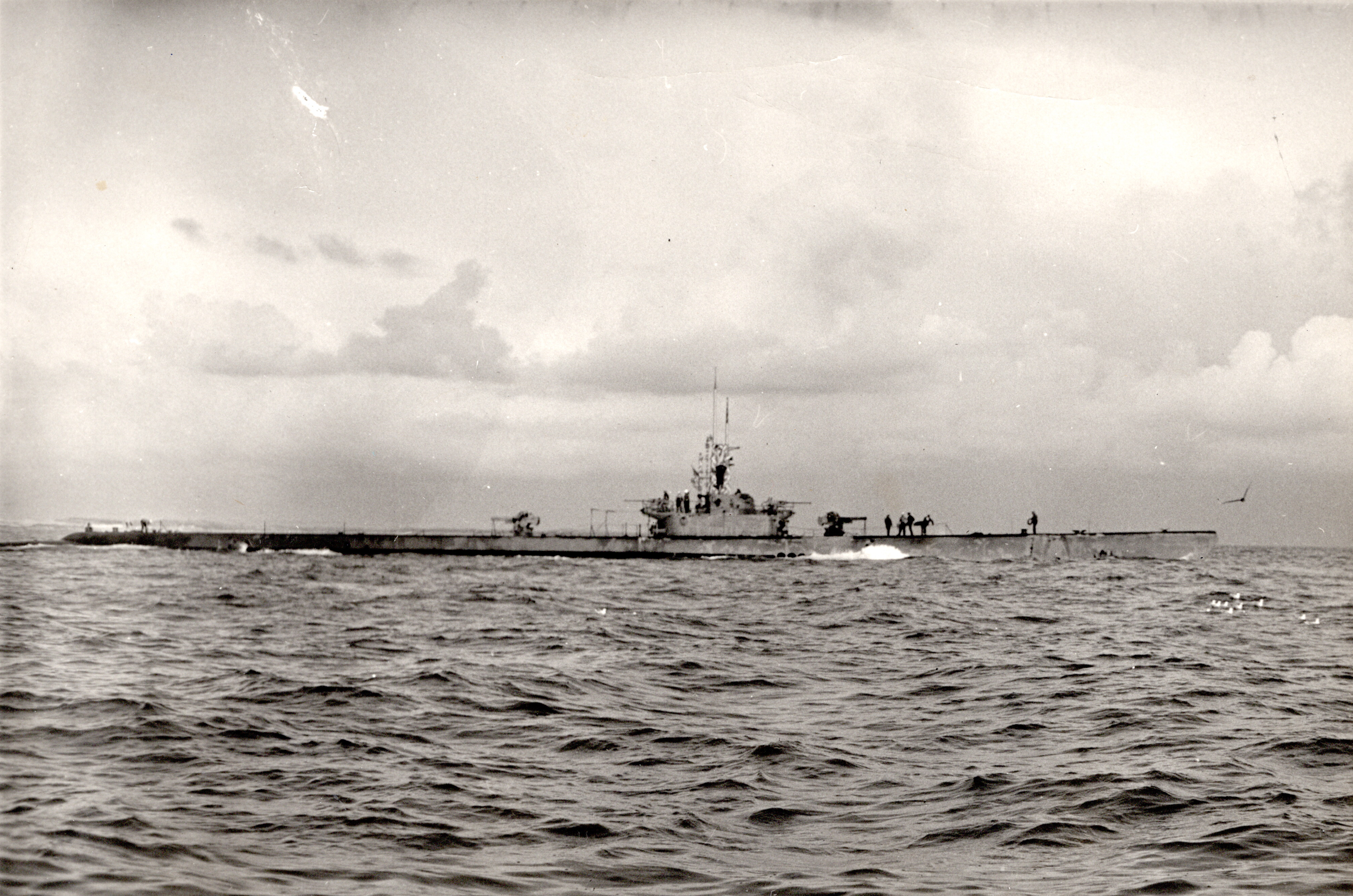
Bullhead following her deck gun refit in July 1945

On 4 July 1945, Griffith was relieved by Lieutenant Commander Edward R. Holt, Jr. as commander of Bullhead. Holt, who had already served on 10 war patrols in junior officer positions, wrote to his wife that he hoped to "live up to the wonderful job Comdr. Griffith had done." Griffith spent a few weeks planning Bullhead's third patrol with Holt before departing for Guam to become Assistant Operations Officer to Vice Admiral Lockwood. During this time, Bullhead was refitted with a second 5-inch deck gun on her forward deck, as well as a second 40 mm Bofors autocannon to replace the Oerlikon 20 mm autocannon on the forward bridge.

On 31 July 1945 Bullhead left Fremantle to commence her third war patrol. Her orders were to patrol in a "wolfpack" with Capitaine and Puffer in the Java Sea until 5 September and then head for Subic Bay in the Philippines. On 4 August, Bullhead met the Dutch submarine HNLMS O 21 350 miles south of the Lombok Strait and transferred a sack of mail intended for the United States. This was the last confirmed sighting of Bullhead.

Bullhead reported on 6 August that she had passed through Lombok Strait. That was the last word received from Bullhead. On 12 August, Capitaine, planning to arrive on 13 August, ordered Bullhead to take position the following day in a scouting line with Capitaine and Puffer. Receiving no reply, Capitaine reported on 15 August, "Have been unable to contact Bullhead by any means since arriving in area."

Since the British submarines HMS Taciturn and Thorough were in the same general area as Bullhead, and Cod and Chub passed through in transit at various times, it is difficult to determine precisely which of the many Japanese anti-submarine attacks was the one that sank Bullhead. However, one occurred on 6 August 1945, when a Mitsubishi Ki-51 from the 73rd Independent Chutai (literally "company" or squadron) of the Imperial Japanese Army Air Force attacked with depth charges. It claimed two direct hits, and for ten minutes thereafter, there was a great amount of gushing oil and air bubbles rising in the water. Since the position given is very near the Balinese coast, it is presumed that the proximity of mountain peaks shortened Bullhead's radar range and prevented her from receiving a warning of the plane's approach. 84 men were lost while serving on Bullhead during the sinking.

== Honors and awards ==
Bullhead received two battle stars for her World War II service.

== Commemoration ==
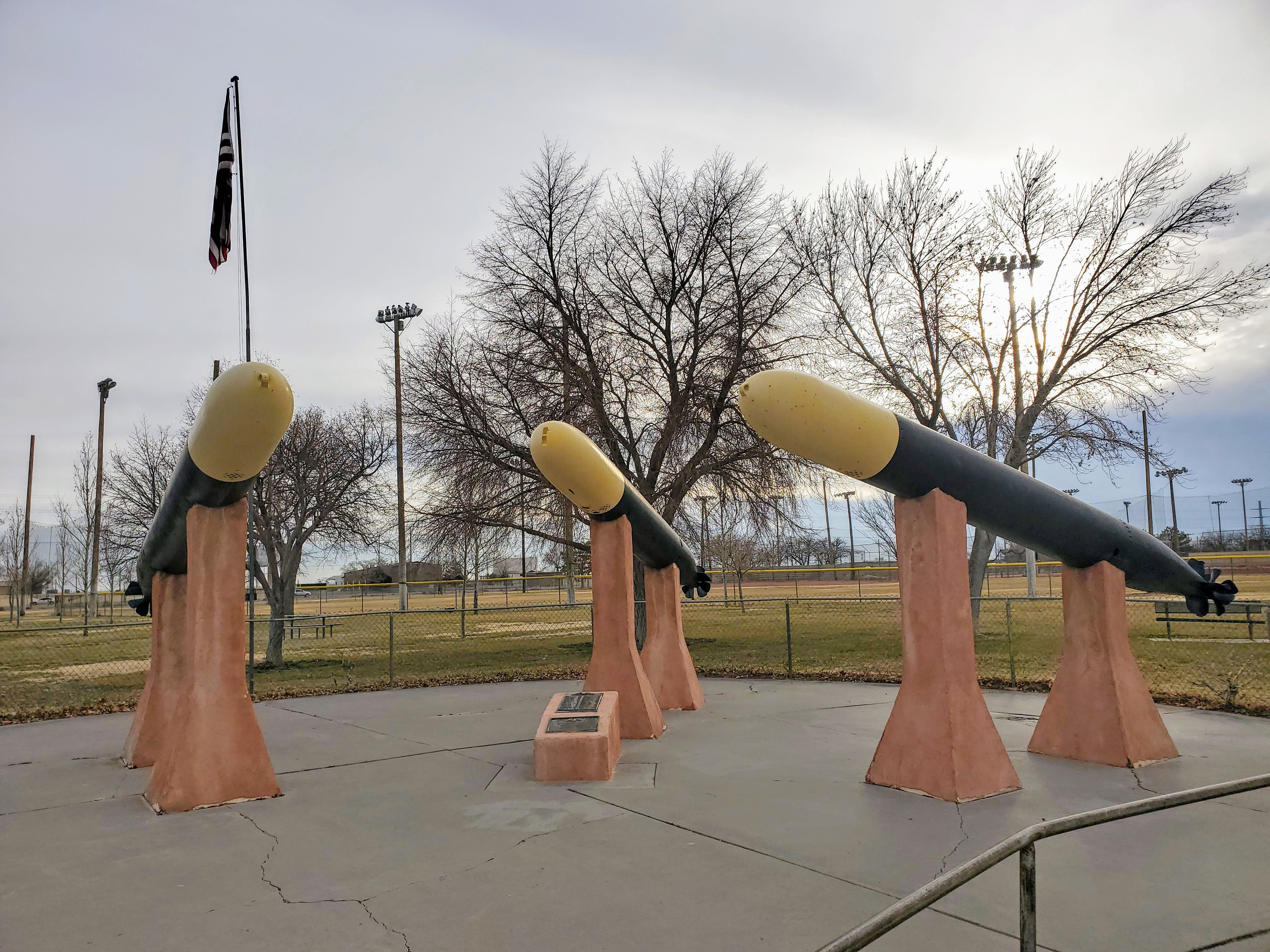
USS Bullhead Memorial Park in Albuquerque, New Mexico, dedicated 7 April 1979

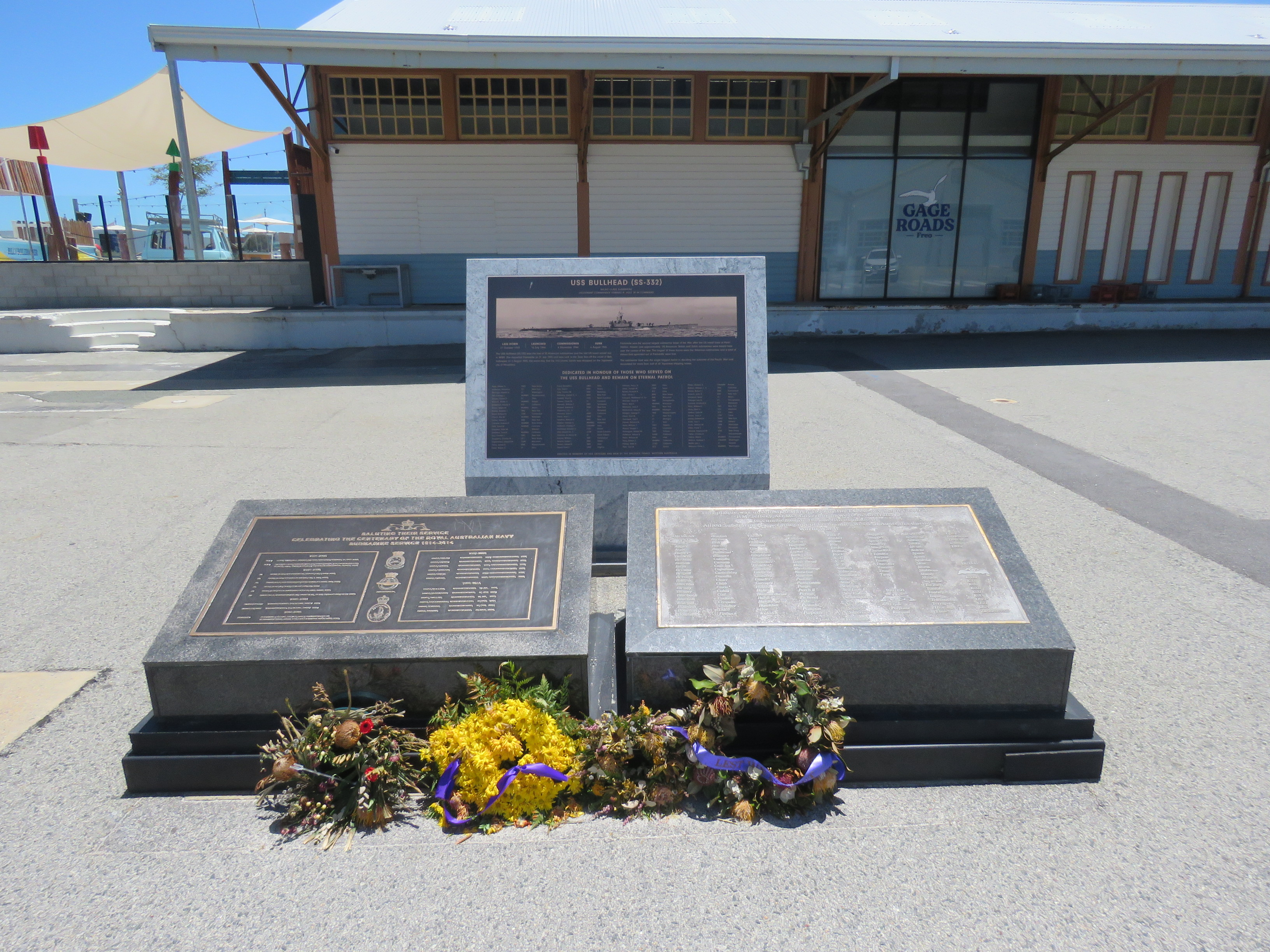
USS Bullhead memorial at the WA Maritime Museum

In August 2022, on the 76th anniversary of the submarine's sinking, a new memorial for USS Bullhead was unveiled at the WA Maritime Museum, Fremantle, Western Australia in the presence of the U.S. Consul General David Gainer.

== See also ==
- List of U.S. Navy losses in World War II

== Bibliography ==
- Hinman, Charles R., and Douglas E. Campbell. The Submarine Has No Friends: Friendly Fire Incidents Involving U.S. Submarines During World War II. Syneca Research Group, Inc., 2019. ISBN 978-0-359-76906-3.
- Sheridan, Martin (1947). Overdue and Presumed Lost: The Story of the U.S.S. Bullhead. New Hampshire: Marshall Jones Company.
