= Walter T. Griffith =

US Navy admiral and submarine commander (1911–1966)

Walter Thomas Griffith
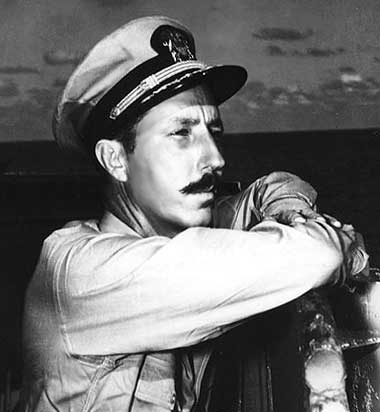
- Griffith on USS Bullhead in April 1945
- Born: June 3, 1911; Mansfield, Louisiana, U.S.
- Died: January 25, 1966 (aged 54); Pensacola, Florida, U.S.
- Military career
- Allegiance: United States of America
- Branch: United States Navy
- Service years: 1928–1956
- Rank: Rear Admiral
- Nicknames: "Griff", "Red" (Note: The "Red" nickname was due to Griffith's auburn hair.)
- Commands: USS O-2; USS Bowfin; USS Bullhead
- Conflicts: World War II
- Awards: Navy Cross (2); Silver Star

Walter Thomas Griffith (June 3, 1911 – January 25, 1966) was a United States Navy submarine commander in World War II. He commanded USS Bowfin (SS-287) on her second through fourth patrols, becoming her most successful commanding officer and earning the boat the Presidential Unit Citation for her second patrol. He later served as the commanding officer of USS Bullhead (SS-332) for her first two patrols.

== Early life and education ==
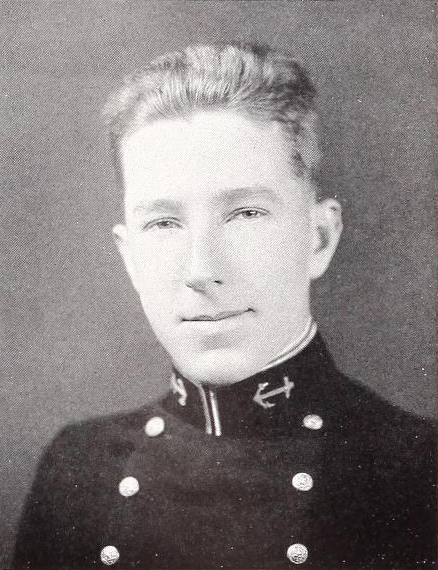
Midshipman Griffith at the United States Naval Academy in 1934.

Griffith was born in Mansfield, Louisiana on June 3, 1911. He attended public school until 10th grade, before enlisting in the United States Navy on his 17th birthday in 1928. Two years after enlisting, he was accepted into the United States Naval Academy. At the Naval Academy, he participated in track and cross country. Griffith graduated in May 1934 and was commissioned as an Ensign. After completing his required two years of fleet duty on board USS Louisville (CA-28), Griffith chose to specialize in submarines and completed the six-month Submarine School course in December 1936. He married his wife Lynn that same year.

== Naval career ==
=== Early assignments ===
After completing Submarine School, Griffith was assigned to USS Porpoise (SS-172). While on Porpoise, Griffith served at the West Coast, Pearl Harbor, the Philippines, and made port calls in China. Griffith left Porpoise in October 1941 and reported to Naval Submarine Base New London where he was promoted to Lieutenant. He served as the commanding officer of USS O-2 (SS-63) from May 1942 to January 1943 training new submarine crews, before being sent to Prospective Commanding Officers' School. After completing the advanced course, Griffith was assigned as the executive officer and navigator on USS Gar (SS-206) during her seventh patrol from April to May 1943. Following this successful patrol, Griffith was promoted to Lieutenant Commander and given a desk job at Fremantle submarine base until a submarine commanding officer position opened up.

=== USS Bowfin ===
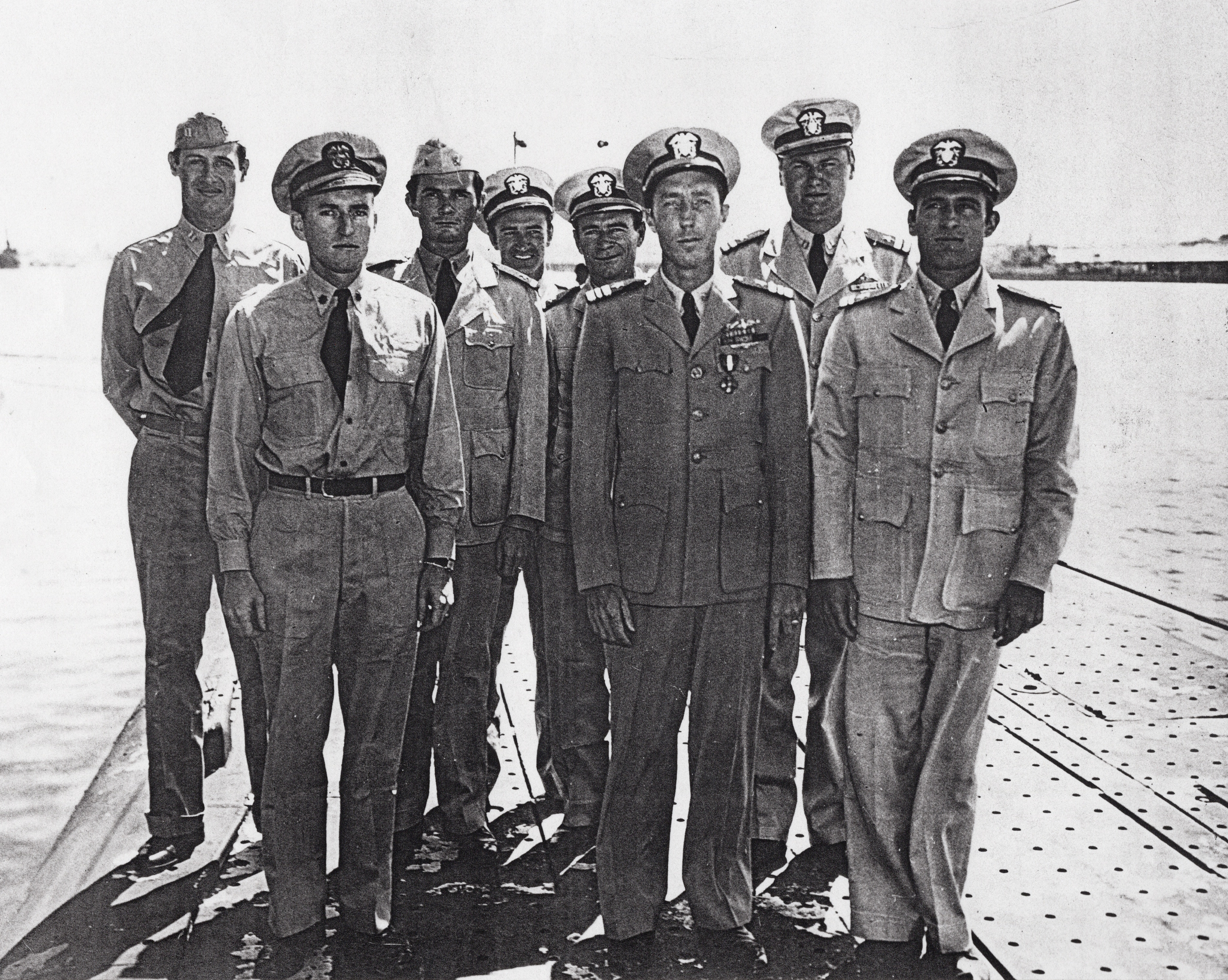
USS Bowfin officers from the second patrol. Griffith is third from the right.

On October 26, 1943, Griffith succeeded Commander Joseph H. Willingham as commanding officer of USS Bowfin following her first patrol. Griffith was selected by Commander, Submarines, Southwest Pacific (COMSUBSOWESPAC) Rear Admiral Ralph Waldo Christie over Bowfin's current executive officer Lieutenant Commander William Thompson despite a request by Willingham that Thompson be the one to succeed himself. Griffith spent the next week training and becoming accustomed to his new crew before departing Fremantle on November 1, 1943 for Bowfin's second war patrol.

During Bowfin's second patrol, Griffith took the submarine through the Makassar Strait into the South China Sea. At first, Bowfin encountered several small ships, which Griffith ordered to be destroyed with deck guns rather than wasting torpedoes. While in stormy weather off the coast of French Indochina on the morning of November 26, Bowfin inadvertently sailed into the middle of a large Japanese convoy, which she subsequently attacked. On November 28, Griffith coordinated with Commander Frederick Colby Lucas, Jr. of USS Billfish (SS-286) to attack another large Japanese convoy east of Cape Varella before returning to Fremantle for repairs, arriving on December 9. Bowfin claimed 70,948 tons across 9 large and 5 small vessels sunk during her patrol, which was the highest scoring war patrol for any American submarine up to that point. JANAC later revised this total down to 26,458 tons across 5 large and 8 small vessels. Griffith received his first Navy Cross for this patrol, and Bowfin later received the Presidential Unit Citation.

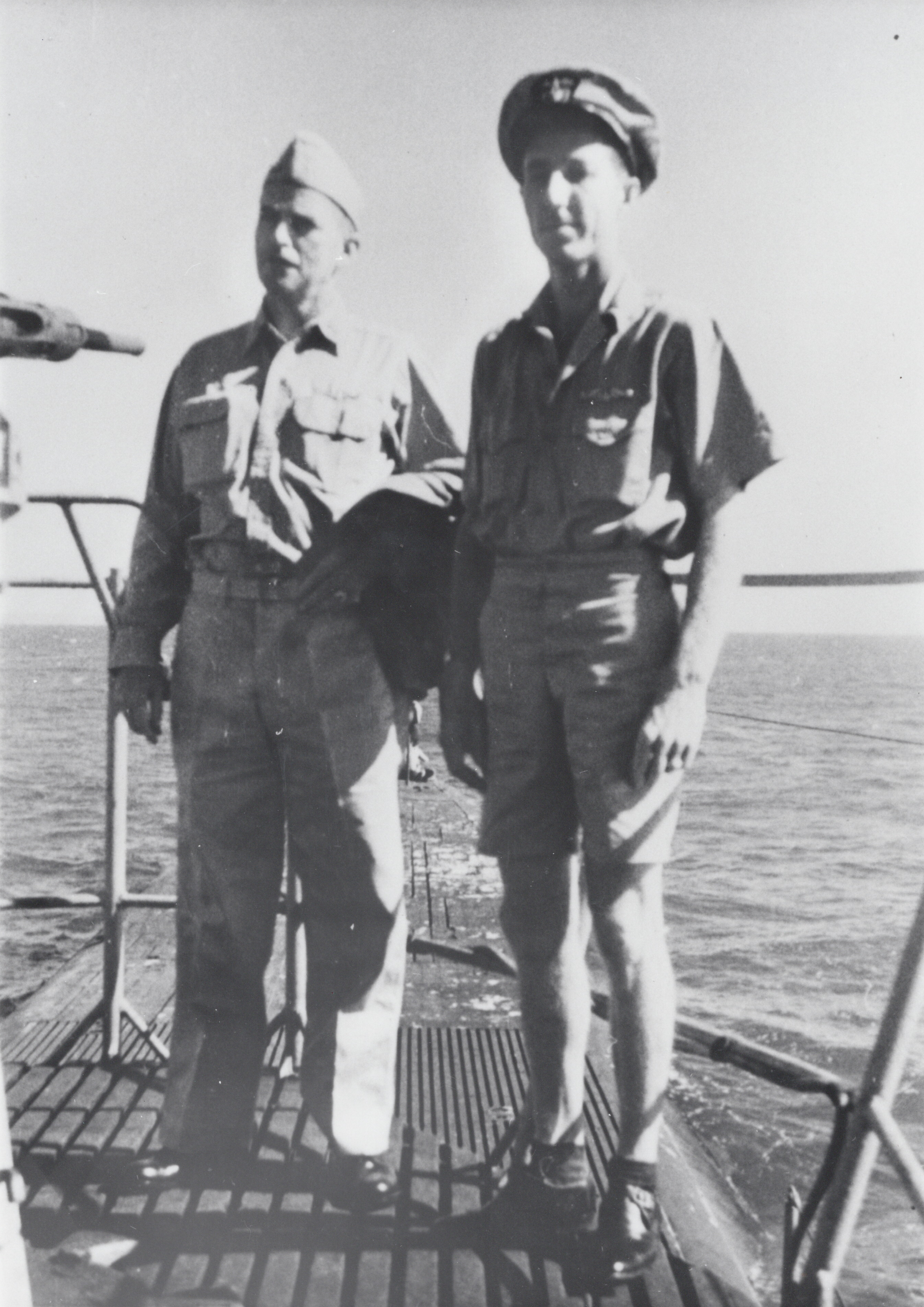
Griffith (right) with RADM Christie on Bowfin's third patrol in January 1944.

Bowfin left for her third patrol on January 8, 1944, bound for the Celebes Sea via the Makassar Strait. In less than 2 weeks, Bowfin expended 14 of her 21 torpedoes and Griffith was ordered to head for Darwin, Australia for refueling and rearming. On January 24, Rear Admiral Christie flew up from Fremantle to Darwin to join Griffith and Bowfin for the rest of her patrol. Griffith was one of Christie's favorite submarine commanders not only due to his aggressive pursuit of targets, but also because Griffith's reports largely avoided singling out faulty torpedoes as the primary reason for failed attacks. Several other submarine commanders complained about flaws with the Mark 14 torpedo and disabled the magnetic detonation feature of the Mark 6 exploder to improve reliability, which angered Christie as he was one of the chief architects of the Mark 6 in the 1930s and was convinced poor crew maintenance was behind the failures. Commander-in-Chief, U.S. Pacific Fleet (CINCPACFLT) Admiral Chester W. Nimitz had already ordered the disabling of the magnetic exploder on June 24, 1943, but his authority only affected submarines based out of Pearl Harbor and operating in the Pacific Ocean Areas, not Christie's South West Pacific Area. Christie joined Griffith on the bridge during several torpedo attacks in the Flores and Java Seas, and complimented the crew on their methodical nature. Bowfin returned to Fremantle on February 5, claiming 12,638 tons across 3 large and 3 small vessels sunk, as well as 18,200 tons and 2 vessels damaged. Griffith received a promotion to Commander and a second Navy Cross.

Bowfin departed Fremantle for her fourth war patrol on February 28, 1944, stopping in Darwin to refuel before proceeding to the eastern Celebes Sea via the Banda Sea on March 6. During this patrol, Christie had Griffith operate his torpedoes with modifications to the exploders proposed by submarine commanders Chester Nimitz Jr. and James McCallum in a final attempt to rectify the Mark 6's issues. Christie's instructions to Griffith essentially ignored a directive from Commander, Allied Naval Forces, Southwest Pacific Area Vice Admiral Thomas C. Kinkaid, who had officially ordered that all submarines under his command disable their torpedoes' magnetic exploders on January 20, 1944. An attack against a Japanese convoy on March 10 was hampered by faulty torpedoes and aggressive Japanese depth charge attacks. Following a reload at Darwin from March 14–15, Bowfin continued its patrol and made several more attacks against Japanese shipping before returning to Fremantle on April 1. Griffith's war patrol report noted numerous premature torpedo detonations in spite of the exploder modifications, which finally convinced Christie that the Mark 6's magnetic detonation feature should be permanently disabled. Bowfin claimed 20,982 tons and 3 large vessels sunk, as well as 11,464 tons and 2 vessels damaged. Griffith received a Silver Star for this patrol.

On April 15, 1944, Griffith was relieved by Commander John Corbus as commander of Bowfin and sent stateside for a period of rest.

=== USS Bullhead ===
Following his rest, Griffith briefly served as an instructor at Prospective Commanding Officers' School before being sent to Portsmouth Naval Shipyard in Maine to lead the trial and commissioning crew of the new submarine USS Bullhead. From Bullhead's launching on July 16, 1944 until her commissioning on December 4, 1944, Griffith oversaw the submarines’ sea trials and assembled his new crew around four experienced sailors who had followed him from Bowfin. For the three months following Bullhead's commissioning, Griffith led the crew in shakedown training around Narragansett Bay, Key West, and the Panama Canal Zone before heading to Pearl Harbor and then Guam. At Guam, Griffith met with Commander, Submarines, Pacific (COMSUBPAC) Vice Admiral Charles A. Lockwood who introduced him to Boston Globe reporter Martin Sheridan, who would be accompanying Bullhead on her first patrol.

Bullhead departed Apra Harbor on March 21, 1945, bound for the South China Sea south of Formosa for lifeguard duty. With no airmen needing rescue, Griffith received permission from COMSUBPAC to bombard Pratas Island with deck guns on March 31, and later on April 24. On April 8, Bullhead was nearly bombed by a B-24 Liberator while travelling in a safety lane, which caused Griffith to demand an investigation into reports of Fifth Air Force planes improperly patrolling submarine safe zones. On April 16, Bullhead rescued three airmen from a downed B-25 Mitchell that had already been picked up by Chinese fishermen in Bias Bay near Hong Kong. (Note: Rescued radioman/waist gunner Sgt. Robert Tukel later recalled that while he initially feared the approaching submarine was Japanese, he was relieved when he saw Griffith on the bridge because, "I had never heard of a red haired Jap.") The risky rescue mission was conducted only four miles from the Japanese-occupied Chinese coast and in 12 fathom (72 feet) deep water, which led to Griffith ordering the preemptive destruction of secret decoding equipment onboard prior to going in for the rescue. Bullhead was ordered back to port on April 25, but prior to leaving his patrol area, Griffith ordered that Bullhead's extra provisions be distributed to local fishermen. Bullhead finished her first patrol at Subic Bay, Philippines on April 28 having only sunk four mines with gunfire.

Bullhead left for her second patrol on May 21, 1945, transiting the South China Sea on her way towards the Gulf of Siam and Java Sea. The first four weeks saw very little action, while Griffith suffered from dysentery. On June 19, Bullhead conducted an extensive surface gun action off St. Nicholas Point, Java where she sunk or damaged several small coastal freighters. On June 24, Griffith spent several hours stalking an 8,000 ton ship with red cross markings that was operating suspiciously, but was denied permission from headquarters to attack it with torpedoes. (Note: Although the ship had large red cross markings, it was also following a zigzag course instead of a straight course and using red lights instead of white lights, both of which were in violation of instructions to mercy vessels.) The next day, Bullhead rescued 10 Javanese conscripts from a Japanese coastal freighter that it had sunk. After a Dutch-speaking Bullhead crew member interrogated one of the survivors, they were released. Bullhead finished her second patrol at Fremantle on July 2, claiming 1,850 tons across 2 large and 2 small vessels as sunk, as well as 1,300 tons and 3 vessels damaged, all in gun actions.

On July 4, 1945, Griffith was relieved by Lieutenant Commander Edward R. Holt, Jr. as commander of Bullhead. Holt, who had already served on 10 war patrols in junior officer positions, wrote to his wife that he hoped to "live up to the wonderful job Comdr. Griffith had done." Griffith spent a few weeks planning Bullhead's third patrol with Holt before departing for Guam to become Assistant Operations Officer to Vice Admiral Lockwood.

=== Later assignments ===
Soon after arriving at Guam, Griffith was admitted to a Navy hospital to recover from general exhaustion. On August 6, 1945, Bullhead became the last U.S. Navy ship sunk by enemy action in World War II when it was depth charged by a Mitsubishi Ki-51 while operating in the Java Sea. Griffith was devastated by the news of the loss of his former submarine. He wrote personal condolence letters to all the families of the lost crew members.

After the war, Griffith served as an instructor at the Naval War College and was later stationed at Naval Station Norfolk and Naval Station Pearl Harbor. In 1952, he was assigned to the Pentagon as an assistant to the Joint Chiefs of Staff. He retired in 1956 and received a tombstone promotion to Rear Admiral.

== Later life ==
After retiring from the Navy, Griffith worked in public relations at Electric Boat Company in Groton, Connecticut. He later left the company to do private consulting.

In 1958, Griffith made a guest appearance on an episode of the TV series The Silent Service entitled "The Bowfin Story." In the episode, which dramatized Bowfin's second patrol, Griffith was played by actor John Hudson.

Griffith never recovered from the loss of Bullhead. He suffered from survivor's guilt and sought help from psychiatrists, who ultimately deemed him "as much a war casualty as the ones who are six feet under." His wife Lynn reported him as saying, "My boys shouldn't have gone down without me. All so young. I should have been with them." Griffith's condition eventually led to a divorce, and he spent his last years giving away his war memorabilia in an attempt to forget the war.

On January 25, 1966, Griffith committed suicide in a motel in Pensacola, Florida. He was survived by his ex-wife and two daughters.

== Summary of war patrols ==
With a JANAC credit of 9 ships and 45,874 tons sunk, Griffith ranks 25th in ships and 20th in tonnage sunk among U.S. Navy submarine skippers during World War II.

Summary of Walter T. Griffith's War Patrols
	Departing From	Date	Days	Wartime Credit Ships/Tonnage	JANAC Credit Ships/Tonnage	Patrol Area
Bowfin-2	Fremantle, Australia	November 1, 1943	39	9 / 70,948	5 / 26,458	South China Sea
Bowfin-3	Fremantle, Australia	January 8, 1944	29	3 / 12,638	1 / 4,408	Makassar
Bowfin-4	Fremantle, Australia	February 28, 1944	34	3 / 20,982	3 / 15,008	Celebes
Bullhead-1	Apra Harbor, Guam	March 21, 1945	39	zero / zero	zero / zero	South China Sea
Bullhead-2	Subic Bay, Philippines	May 21, 1945	43	2 / 1850	zero / zero	South China Sea

== Awards and decorations ==
Griffith received two Navy Crosses and a Silver Star for his service during World War II.

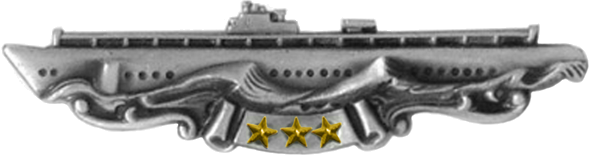

Submarine Warfare insignia
Navy Cross w/ 1 gold award star
Silver Star	Presidential Unit Citation	China Service Medal
American Defense Service Medal w/ Fleet clasp	American Campaign Medal	Asiatic-Pacific Campaign Medal w/ 5 service stars
World War II Victory Medal	National Defense Service Medal	Navy Expert Rifle Marksmanship Ribbon
Submarine Combat Patrol Insignia

== Bibliography ==
- Beynon, Robert P. (2002). The Pearl Harbor Avenger. Deland, Florida: Just Books 1. ISBN 0-9716921-0-6.
- Blair, Clay Jr. (2001). Silent Victory: The U.S. Submarine War Against Japan. Annapolis, Maryland: Naval Institute Press. ISBN 1-55750-217-X.
- Hoyt, Edwin Palmer (1983). Bowfin. New York: Van Nostrand Reinhold Company Inc. ISBN 978-0442231699.
- Mastrangelo, Joseph P. (August 16, 1981). "Haunted Survivors of the USS Bullhead". Washington Post.
- Newpower, Anthony (2006). Iron Men and Tin Fish: The Race to Build a Better Torpedo During World War II. Annapolis, Maryland: Naval Institute Press. ISBN 978-1-59114-623-0.
- Roscoe, Theodore (1949). United States Submarine Operations in World War II. Annapolis, Maryland: United States Naval Institute.
- Sheridan, Martin (1947). Overdue and Presumed Lost: The Story of the U.S.S. Bullhead. New Hampshire: Marshall Jones Company.
