= Corbus =

Corbus is a surname. Notable people with the surname include:

- Bill Corbus (1911–1998), American football player
- John Corbus (1907–1966), United States submarine commander
