= Shinyō Maru No. 3 =

Japanese cargo ship in service 1917-1945

History

Empire of Japan
- Name: Shinyō Maru No. 3
- Builder: American Ship Building Company, Cleveland, Ohio, USA
- Launched: 1917
- Sponsored by: Skibs Akties Lodding's Rederi, Norway
- Completed: June 1917
- Identification: 33184
- Fate: Torpedoed 11 June 1945
- Notes: Call sign: TLWG (1930–1933); Call sign: JAZC (1933–1945)

General characteristics
- Type: Cargo ship
- Tonnage: 1,898 GRT
- Length: 76.50 m (251 ft 0 in) o/a
- Beam: 13.26 m (43 ft 6 in)
- Draught: 6.10 m (20 ft 0 in)
- Installed power: 820 hp (610 kW)
- Speed: 9 to 10 kn (17 to 19 km/h; 10 to 12 mph)

Shinyō Maru No. 3 (Japanese: 第三 信洋丸) or Sinyo Maru No. 3 (ex-Carmen, ex-Heng Tai, ex-Josho Maru) was an American-built Japanese cargo ship during World War II.

== History ==
She was laid down in 1917 at the Cleveland, Ohio shipyard of the American Ship Building Company for the benefit of Skibs Akties Lodding's Rederi of Norway. She was completed in June 1917 and christened Carmen. In 1927, she was sold to Heng An S.S. (Hengan Steamship Company) of Shanghai and renamed Heng Tai (と改名). In 1928, she was sold to Matsukawa Ryo Shokai (松川菱商会) in Nishinomiya and renamed Josho Maru. In 1933, she was sold to Okada Shosen, K.K./Okada Shipping Co., Ltd. (岡田海運) in Kyoto and renamed Shinyō Maru No. 3 (第三 信洋丸). On 1 March 1944, she was transferred to Daiko Merchant Shipping Co., Ltd. of Osaka after it merged with Okada Shipping. The Lloyd's Register indicates her name was changed to Sinyo Maru in 1939 but Japanese sources do not confirm this.

On 11 June 1945, while traveling un-escorted, the submarine USS Bowfin spotted her and fired four torpedoes, one of which hit. She sank in two minutes at 39°20′N 127°30′E off Wonsan, Korea.
