= Sinkyo Maru =

Japanese cargo steamship

History

Japan
- Name: 1932: Shinkyo Maru; 1938: Sinkyo Maru
- Owner: Chōsen Yusen KK
- Operator: 1940: Imperial Japanese Navy
- Port of registry: 1933: (Empire of Japan) Jinsen
- Builder: Uraga Dock Co, Uraga
- Laid down: 25 February 1932
- Launched: 24 November 1932
- Completed: 11 April 1933
- Refit: November – December 1943
- Homeport: 1940: Sasebo
- Identification: by 1935: call sign JERG
- Fate: sunk by torpedo, 1944

General characteristics
- Type: cargo ship
- Tonnage: 2,672 GRT, 1,554 NRT
- Length: 298.2 ft (90.9 m)
- Beam: 44.9 ft (13.7 m)
- Depth: 23.6 ft (7.2 m)
- Decks: 1
- Installed power: 1 × triple-expansion engine + exhaust steam turbine; 171 NHP
- Propulsion: 1 × screw
- Speed: 14 knots (26 km/h)
- Armament: 1940: 3 × 12 cm/45 3rd Year Type naval guns; 2 × Type 93 heavy machine guns; 1 × 7.7 mm machine gun; 2 × stern-mounted depth charge racks
- Notes: sister ship: Seikyo Maru

Sinkyo Maru, formerly romanised as Shinkyo Maru, was a cargo steamship that was launched in Japan in 1932. The Imperial Japanese Navy requisitioned her in 1940. She was converted into an auxiliary gunboat, but also served as a minelayer and a troopship. A United States Navy submarine sank her in the Philippines in 1944, killing 61 of the people aboard.

== Building ==
The Uraga Dock Company in Uraga, Kanagawa, laid the keel plates of Shinkyo Maru on 25 February 1932. She was launched on 24 November that year, and completed on 11 April 1933. Her length was 298.2 ft (90.9 m); her beam was 44.9 ft (13.7 m); and her depth was 23.6 ft (7.2 m). Her tonnages were 2,672 gross register tons (GRT) and 1,554 net register tons (NRT). She had a raked bow, cruiser stern, and well decks fore and aft. She had two masts, and her engine room; boiler room; superstructure; and single funnel were amidships.

Shinkyo Maru had a single screw. Her main engine was a three-cylinder triple-expansion engine. She also had an exhaust steam turbine, which drove the same propeller shaft, but via double reduction gearing. The combined power of her reciprocating engine plus exhaust turbine was rated at 171 nominal horsepower. They gave her a top speed of 14 knots (26 km/h), and a cruising speed of 12 knots (22 km/h).

In 1934, Uraga built a sister ship for the same owners. Seikyo Maru was laid down on 5 May; launched on 20 September; and completed on 15 December.

== Civilian career ==
Chōsen Yusen KK owned Shinkyo Maru. She was registered at Jinsen in Chōsen, which is now Incheon in South Korea. By 1935 her wireless telegraph call sign was JERG. In 1938, the romanisation of her name was changed to Sinkyo Maru. In the 1930s she traded between Chōsen and ports on Honshu, plus at visit to Vladivostok in the Soviet Union in 1933 and 1936.

== Naval career ==
On 15 September 1940, the Japanese Navy requisitioned Sinkyo Maru. On 15 October she was attached to the Sasebo Naval District as an auxiliary gunboat, with Sasebo as her home port. On 15 November she was rated as No. 12 Gunboat, and on 27 December her conversion was completed. Her main battery was three 12 cm/45 3rd Year Type naval guns. She was also armed with two Type 93 heavy machine guns; one 7.7 mm machine gun; a pair of stern-mounted depth charge racks; and 32 depth charges.

On 15 January 1941, Sinkyo Maru was assigned to minelaying operations as an auxiliary gunboat. That March and April, she operated off the central coast of China. From June to August, she operated in southern Chinese waters. On 15 October, she was assigned to local defence of Sasebo. She and another converted merchant ship, the auxiliary gunboat Shinko Maru No. 5, formed the Sasebo Local Defence Squadron. On 14 December she was laid 115 type 93 mines in two minefields. Thereafter she returned to defensive patrols.

=== 1942 ===
On 6 January 1942, Sinkyo Maru was involved in a collision with the auxiliary oiler Akatsuki Maru, in which Sinkyo Maru's bridge was badly damaged. On 15 January she was rated as the Ōshima Area Defence Unit's Sea Surface Defence Unit. On 31 January her bridge was repaired; on 4 February she left Sasebo, and the next day she reached Kakeromajima in the Amami Islands, off the southern coast of Kyushu. She was in Naha on Okinawa from 20 to 25 February.

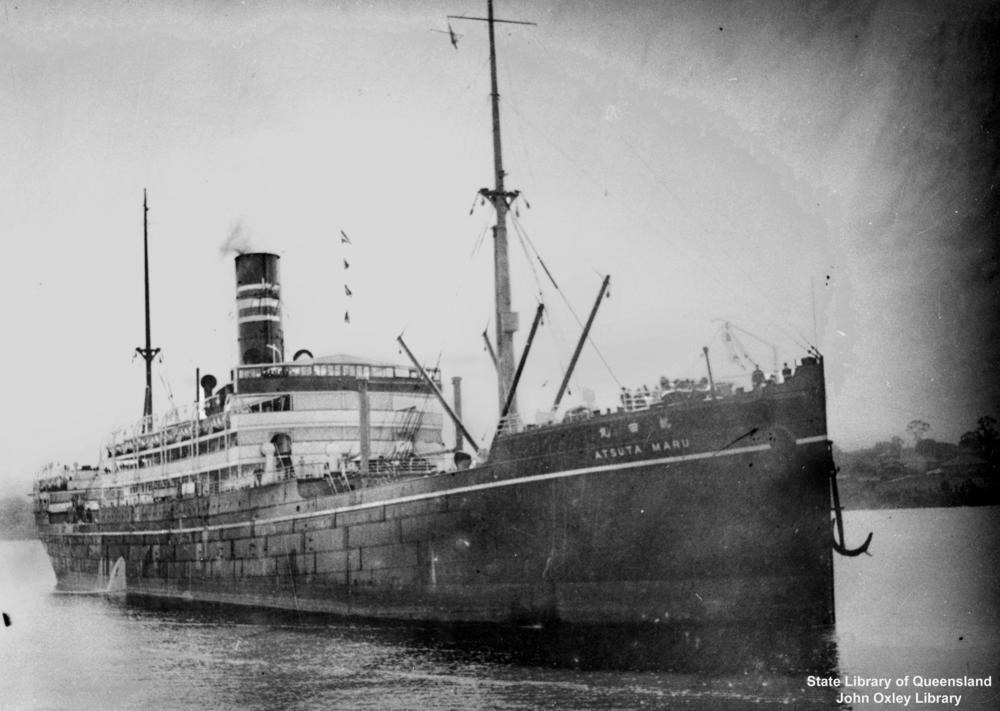
The passenger ship Atsuta Maru, before she became a troopship

On 30 May 1942, the US Navy submarine USS Pompano crippled the 7,983 GRT troopship Atsuta Maru. A flotilla comprising Sinkyo Maru; the auxiliary netlayer Agata Maru; and the auxiliary submarine chasers Ryosui Maru and Hōkoku Maru No. 3 Go put out from Kakeromajima to assist. They made anti-submarine sweeps, and rescued survivors. On 31 May Sinkyo Maru was ordered to fight the fire aboard Agata Maru, but the fire was too great for her to get close enough to the troopship. Atsuta Maru sank on 3 June, about 50 nautical miles (93 km) east of Okinawa.

On 24 July 1942, Sinkyo Maru left Kakeromajima for the Yaeyama Islands. From 26 to 30 July she called at Ishigaki Island; Iriomote Island; and Yonaguni; and then at Miyakojima, Okinawa. She was in Naha from 31 July to 31 August, and then returned to Kakeromajima.

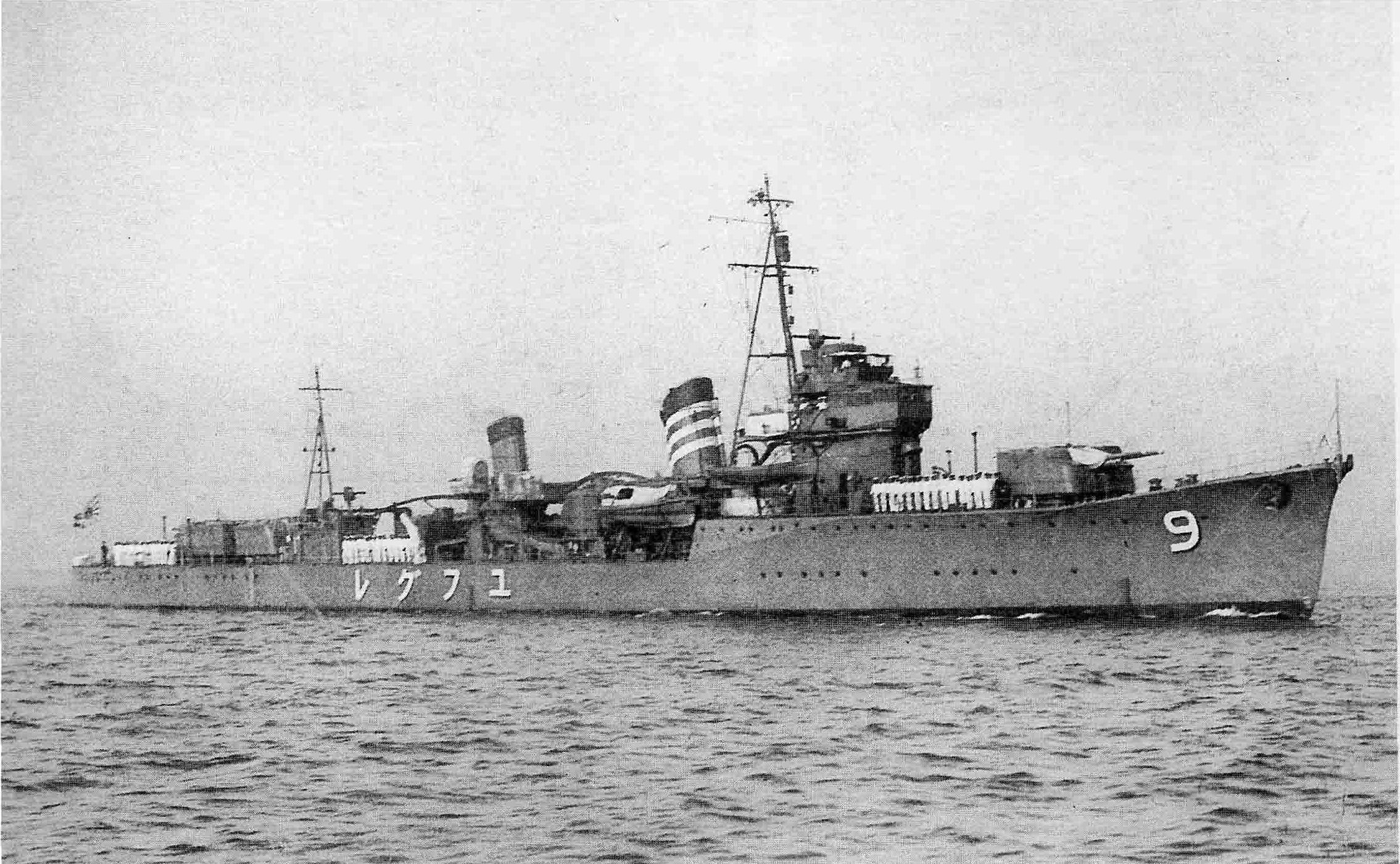
The destroyer Yūgure

On 1 December Sinkyo Maru left Kakeromajima, and on 3 December she reached Sasebo, where she was dry docked from 5 to 11 December. On 18 December she was assigned to help reinforce the Japanese New Guinea campaign, by taking part in one of the convoys carrying the Imperial Japanese Army's 20th and 41st Divisions to Wewak. Between 20 and 24 December she made a round trip to Kakeromajima and back to unload supplies, and then sailed in East Convoy No. 59 to Kawasaki, Kanagawa, where she arrived on 28 December. She was temporarily fitted with anti-submarine protection equipment; an upgrade to her wireless telegraph; and an additional 13 mm machine gun.

=== 1943 ===
On 5 January 1943 she arrived in Busan, where she embarked 399 troops of the 20th Division and 300 bundles of supplies. She left Busan on 7 January, and reached Palau in the Caroline Islands on 15 January. On 19 January she and two other converted merchant ships; Aratama Maru and Juzan Maru; escorted by the destroyer Yūgure. Together they formed the Third Transport Echelon. The echelon reached Wewak at 0200 hrs on 23 January; disembarked its troops and supplies; and left at 1100 hrs the same day. The echelon got back to Palau on 26 January, and left on 30 January for Japanese-occupied Tsingtao (now Qingdao).

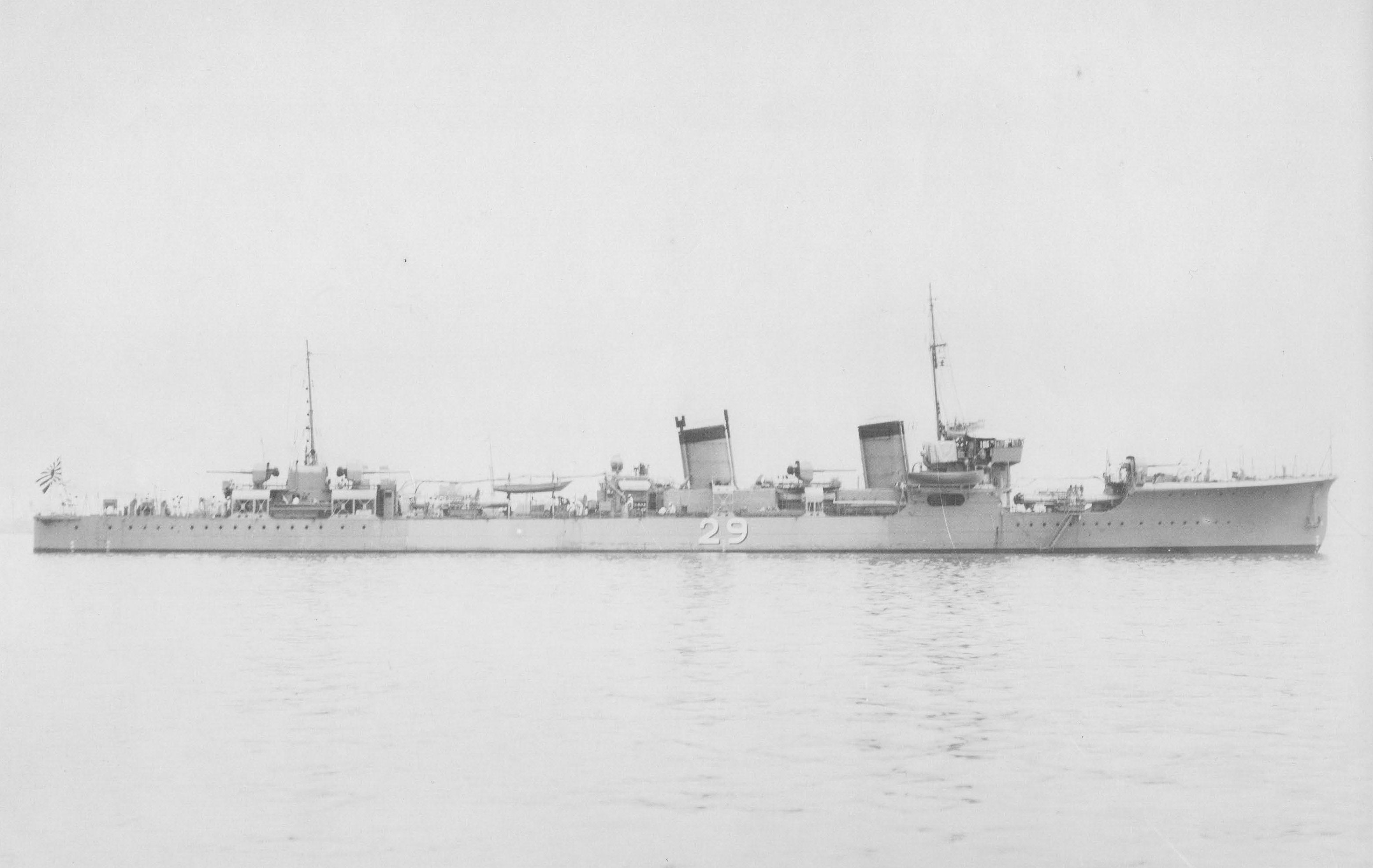
The destroyer Fumizuki

In Tsingtao, Sinkyo Maru embarked troops, vehicles, supplies and provisions of the 41st Division. On 12 February, she left Tsingtao with Aratama Maru and Juzan Maru, and Yūgure joined them as their escort. They called at Palau from 22 to 26 February, and then continued as the Fourth Transport Echelon, with the destroyers Satsuki and Fumizuki joining Yūgure to reinforce their escort. On 26 February the echelon reached Wewak at 1200 hrs; disembarked its troops and supplies; and left at 2330 hrs. The echelon got back to Palau on 2 March. Sinkyo Maru left in 5 March; called at Ōshima on 11 March, and reached Sasebo on 17 March. On 15 March, before she reaches Sasebo, she was attached to the 5th Fleet's 22nd picket boat squadron.

Early in April 1943, Sinkyo Maru was assigned to coastal defence of the east coast of Japan. On 21 April she left Sasebo, and in 24 April she arrived at Yokosuka on the east coast of Honshu. In May she patrolled north via Kushiro on Hokkaido to Paramushiro in the Kuril Islands; returning to Yokosuka in June. She continued to patrol the east coast until 3 November. On 11 November she reached Yokohama, and on 19 November she docked at Mitsubishi Heavy Industries' shipyard there to be refitted and converted. On 4 December she was attached to the Sasebo Naval District as an auxiliary transport.

=== 1944 ===
On 31 January 1944, Sinkyo Maru's conversion was completed, and she transferred to Tokyo. On 3 February she left Tokyo. She was at Kure from 9 to 13 February, and reached Moji on 14 February. On 16 February she left Moji as part of Convoy Mota-03, which included six merchant ships, and was escorted by the Namikaze and minesweeper Tian Maru. On 21 February, US submarines and aircraft attacked Convoy Mota-05. Mota-03 was ordered to remain at Naha, and await the arrival of Mota-05. On 27 February the two convoys merged and left Naha. On 29 February the combined convoy reached Kirun (now Keelung) in Taiwan. On 5 March, Sinkyo Maru sailed from Kirun to Takao (now Kaohsiung). On 11 March she left Takao in Convoy Tama-10, which reached Manila on 14 March.

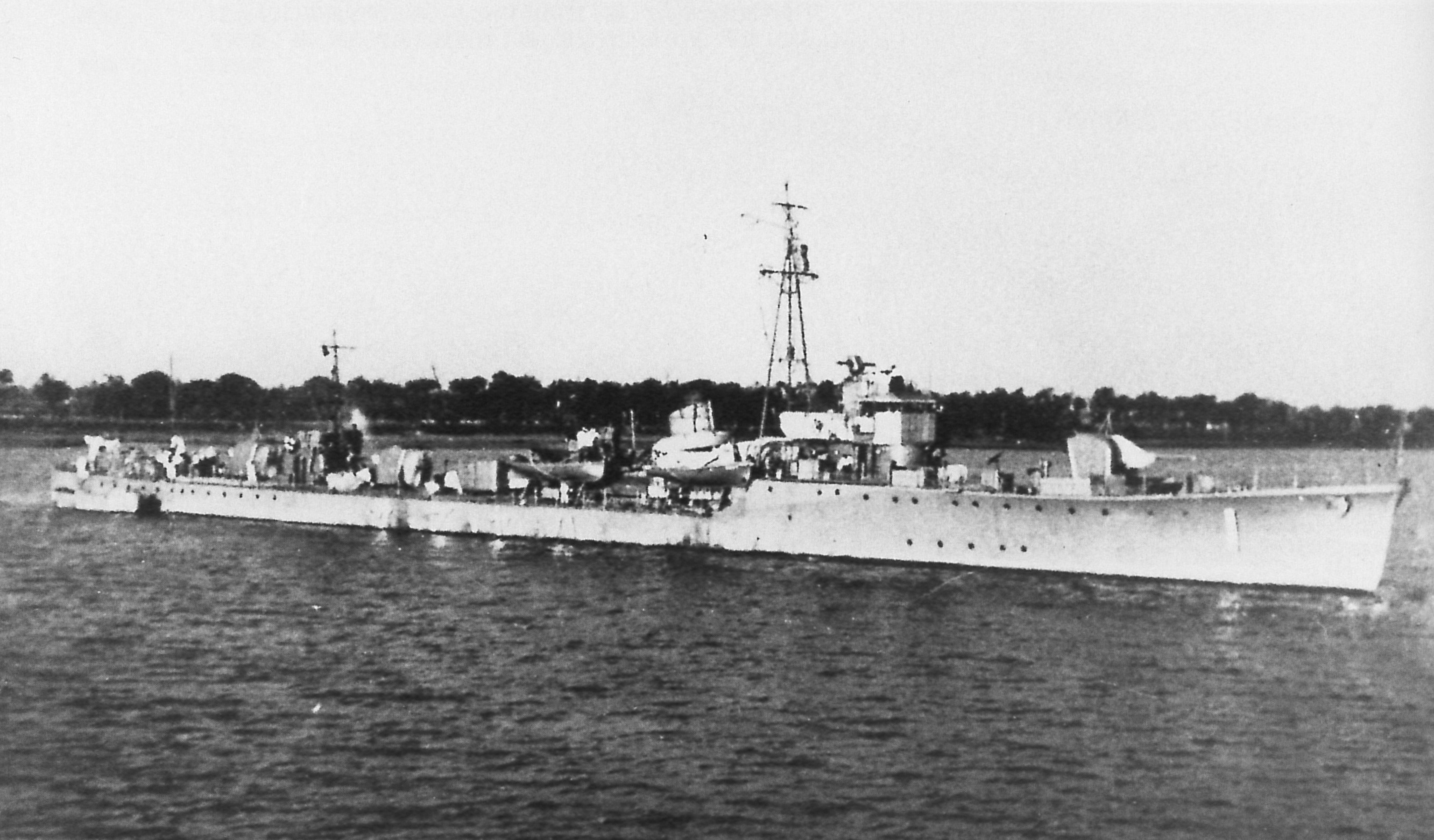
The torpedo boat Hayabusa

On 20 March, Sinkyo Maru left Manila in Convoy H-22, bound for Halmahera in the Maluku Islands. There were seven other ships in the convoy, plus two escorts: the Ōtori-class torpedo boat Hayabusa, and W-19-class minesweeper W-30. On 23 March, in the Basilan Strait, the auxiliary submarine chaser Kyo Maru joined H-22; relieving W-30; which detached. On 24 March, off Mindanao, the US Navy submarine USS Bowfin made radar contact with H-22. At 23:48 hrs Bowfin fired her first torpedo salvo, which sank the cargo liner Bengal Maru. At 2253 hrs she fired another torpedo salvo, which hit Sinkyo Maru. She sank in three minutes at position 05°37′N 125°58′E, and 12 members of her crew and 49 of her passengers were killed.

== Bibliography ==
- Lloyd's Register of Shipping (PDF). Vol. II.–Steamers and Motorships over 300 tons. London: Lloyd's Register of Shipping. 1935 – via Southampton City Council.
- Lloyd's Register of Shipping (PDF). Vol. II.–Steamers and Motorships of 300 tons. Trawlers, tugs, dredgers, etc. London: Lloyd's Register of Shipping. 1939 – via Southampton City Council.
