= Japanese patrol boat Chōkai Maru =

WWII Japanese patrol boat

History

Empire of Japan
- Name: Chōkai Maru
- Builder: Mitsubishi Jukogyo Hikoshima Zosensho
- Laid down: 14 September 1936?
- Launched: 28 June 1936
- Completed: 15 February 1937
- Commissioned: 20 September 1941, requisitioned by the Imperial Japanese Navy
- Decommissioned: 10 May 1945
- Identification: 43156; Call sign: JKHL
- Fate: Sunk, 2 March 1945

General characteristics
- Tonnage: 136 GRT

Chōkai Maru was an auxiliary patrol boat of the Imperial Japanese Navy during World War II.

== History ==
Chōkai Maru was laid down on 14 September 1936 at the shipyard of Mitsubishi Jukogyo Hikoshima Zosensho. She was launched on 28 June 1936 and completed on 15 February 1937. On 5 September 1941, she was requisitioned by the Imperial Japanese Navy and converted to an auxiliary patrol boat. She was assigned to 1st platoon, Patrol division 7, 5th Fleet along with Fukuichi Maru No. 5, Seiju Maru No. 5, and Kairyū Maru. On 2 March 1945, she was torpedoed and sunk by USS Bowfin north-east of Miyake-jima (33°50′N 139°22′E). On 10 May 1945 she was struck from the Navy list.
