= Japanese patrol boat Fukuichi Maru No. 5 =

Imperial Japanese Navy warship

History

Empire of Japan
- Name: Fukuichi Maru No. 5
- Ordered: Tokai Yenyo Gyogyo K.K.
- Builder: Goshi Kaisha Kanasashi Zosensho
- Laid down: 1 March 1933
- Launched: 1 June 1933
- Completed: 1 June 1933
- Commissioned: 5 September 1941, requisitioned by the Imperial Japanese Navy
- Decommissioned: sunk 18 February 1945
- Stricken: 10 April 1945
- Identification: 37768; Call sign: JCZH
- Fate: Sunk 18 February 1945

General characteristics
- Tonnage: 151 GRT
- Length: 28.44 m (93 ft 4 in) o/a
- Beam: 5.94 m (19 ft 6 in)
- Draught: 3.17 m (10 ft 5 in)
- Propulsion: 1 auxiliary diesel engine, single shaft, 1 screw

Fukuichi Maru No. 5 was an auxiliary patrol boat of the Imperial Japanese Navy during World War II.

== History ==
Fukuichi Maru No. 5 was ordered by Japanese shipping company Tokai Yenyo Gyogyo K.K. and laid down on 1 March 1933 at the shipyard of Goshi Kaisha Kanasashi Zosensho. She was launched and completed on 1 June 1933. On 5 September 1941, she was requisitioned by the Imperial Japanese Navy and converted to an auxiliary patrol boat. She was assigned to 1st platoon, Patrol division 7, 5th Fleet along with Chōkai Maru, Seiju Maru No. 5, and Kairyū Maru. On 18 February 1945, she was attacked and sunk northwest of Chichi Jima by the US destroyers Barton, Ingraham, and Moale. She was struck from the Navy list on 10 April 1945.
