= John Corbus =

American submarine commander

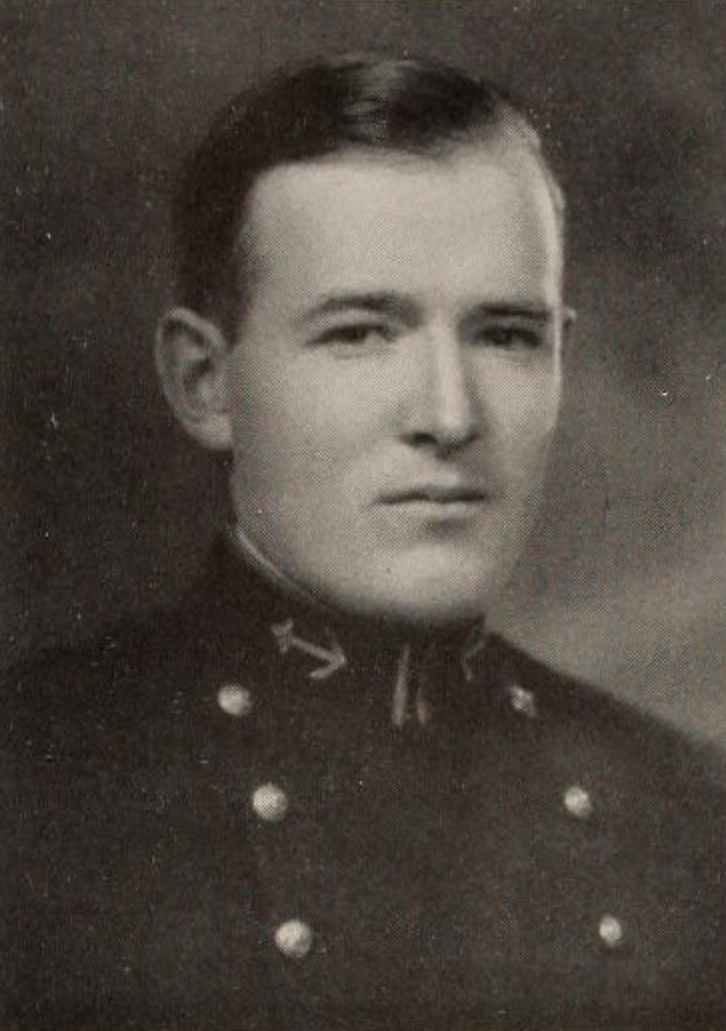
- Born: October 25, 1907; Vallejo, California, U.S.
- Died: March 22, 1966 (aged 58); San Bruno, California, U.S.
- Burial place: Golden Gate National Cemetery
- Alma mater: United States Naval Academy
- Spouse: Alice Cameron Kirkland
- Military career
- Allegiance: United States of America
- Branch: United States Navy
- Service years: 1930-1958
- Rank: Rear Admiral
- Commands: USS R-3 (SS-80); USS S-24 (SS-129); USS Herring; USS Haddo (SS-255); USS Bowfin (SS-287); Submarine Division 81; USS Wrangell
- Conflicts: World War II; Korean War
- Awards: Navy Cross; Legion of Merit

John Corbus (October 25, 1907 – March 22, 1966), born Vallejo, California, was a decorated submarine commander during World War II who reached the rank of Rear Admiral in the United States Navy. He graduated in 1930 from the U.S. Naval Academy at Annapolis.
