= USS Bowfin =

Balao-class submarine of the US Navy

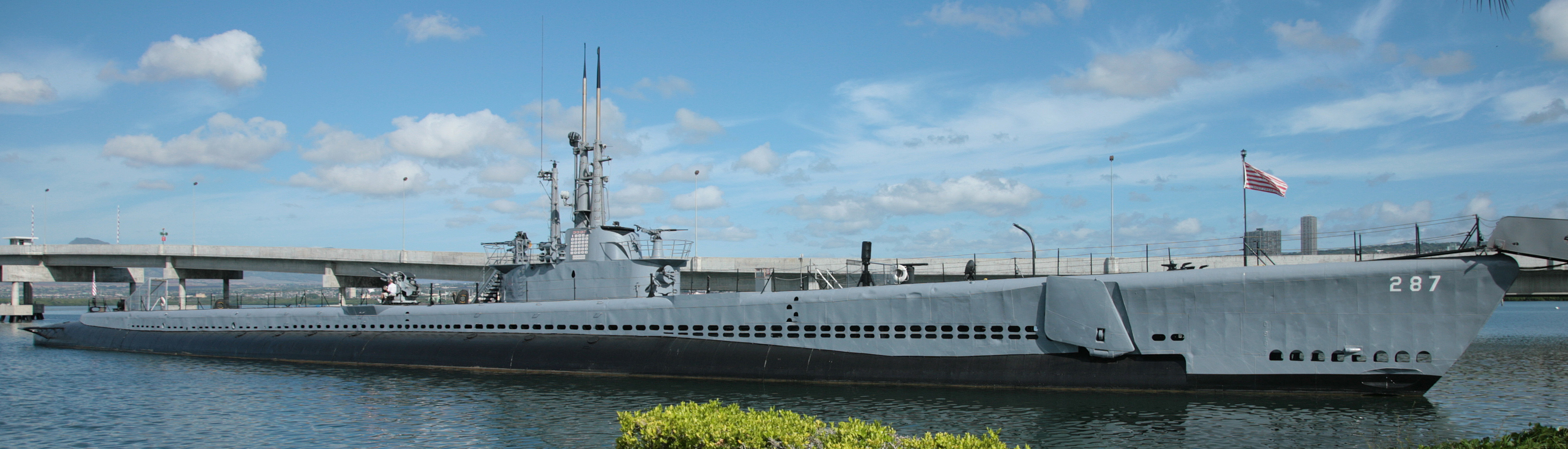
- Bowfin moored at Pearl Harbor, Hawaii, where it is now a museum ship

History

United States
- Namesake: Bowfin
- Builder: Portsmouth Naval Shipyard, Kittery, Maine
- Laid down: 23 July 1942
- Launched: 7 December 1942
- Sponsored by: Mrs. Jane Gawne, wife of Captain James Gawne
- Commissioned: 1 May 1943
- Decommissioned: 12 February 1947
- Recommissioned: 27 July 1951
- Decommissioned: 22 April 1954
- Recommissioned: 10 January 1960
- Decommissioned: 1 December 1971
- Stricken: 1 December 1971
- Identification: Callsign: NWSL
- Status: Museum ship in Pearl Harbor, Hawaii since 1 August 1979
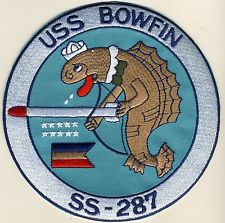
- Badge

General characteristics
- Class & type: Balao-class diesel-electric submarine
- Displacement: 1,526 long tons (1,550 t) surfaced; 2,414 long tons (2,453 t) submerged
- Length: 311 ft 9 in (95.02 m)
- Beam: 27 ft 3 in (8.31 m)
- Draft: 16 ft 10 in (5.13 m) maximum
- Propulsion: 4 × General Motors Model 16-248 V16 Diesel engines driving electric generators; 2 × 126-cell Sargo batteries; 4 × high-speed General Electric electric motors with reduction gears; two propellers; 5,400 shp (4.0 MW) surfaced; 2,740 shp (2.0 MW) submerged
- Speed: 20.25 knots (37.50 km/h) surfaced; 8.75 knots (16.21 km/h) submerged
- Range: 11,000 nautical miles (20,000 km) surfaced at 10 knots (19 km/h)
- Endurance: 48 hours at 2 knots (3.7 km/h) submerged; 75 days on patrol
- Test depth: 400 feet (120 m)
- Complement: 10 officers, 70–71 enlisted
- Armament: 10 × 21-inch (533 mm) torpedo tubes (six forward, four aft; 24 torpedoes); one 4 in (100 mm)/50 caliber deck gun; one 40 mm (1.57 in) Bofors antiaircraft cannon; two .50 cal (12.7 mm) machineguns
- USS Bowfin (submarine)
- U.S. National Register of Historic Places
- U.S. National Historic Landmark
- Location within Hawaii
- Location: 11 Arizona Memorial Dr., Honolulu, Hawaii
- Coordinates: 21°22′7.29″N 157°56′21.91″W
- Built: 1942
- Architect: Portsmouth Navy Yard
- NRHP reference No.: 82000149

Significant dates
- Added to NRHP: 16 November 1982
- Designated NHL: 14 January 1986

USS Bowfin (SS/AGSS-287), is a Balao-class submarine of the United States Navy named for the bowfin fish. Since 1981, she has been open to public tours at the Pacific Fleet Submarine Museum (formerly USS Bowfin Submarine Museum & Park) in Pearl Harbor, Hawaii, next to the USS Arizona Memorial Visitor Center.

Bowfin was laid down by the Portsmouth Naval Shipyard at Kittery, Maine, on 23 July 1942 and launched on 7 December 1942 by Mrs. Jane Gawne, wife of Captain James Gawne; she was commissioned on 1 May 1943, with Commander Joseph H. Willingham in command.

== First patrol ==
Following fitting out, the submarine proceeded via Newport, Rhode Island, to New London, Connecticut, her base for shakedown training. Early in July 1943, she got underway for the Pacific war zone, and after transiting the Panama Canal and crossing the Pacific, reached Australia. After-voyage repair at Brisbane preceded her getting underway on 19 August to move north and west along the Australian coast to Darwin. She topped off her fuel tanks at that port and sailed on the morning of 25 August for her first war patrol.

Bowfin reached the Mindanao Sea on 2 September, but patrolled for more than three weeks without finding any worthwhile targets. On 24 September, she met Billfish to conduct coordinated operations. The next day, the two submarines began tracking a six-ship convoy and continued the chase for some five hours before Bowfin finally attained a suitable attack position. She then launched her six bow torpedoes, four at a cargo ship and two at a trailing transport. Three exploded against the side of the first ship, and both of those fired at the second struck home. The submarine immediately turned her fantail toward the convoy and emptied her stern tubes, sending four torpedoes in the direction of a tanker. Gunfire at her periscope forced Bowfin to go deep, so prevented her crew from observing the progress of her last salvo, but they heard its torpedoes explode. When the submarine rose to periscope depth about an hour later, the 8,120 GRT passenger-cargo ship Kirishima Maru was slowly sinking, the tanker was on fire, and the transport seemed to be settling by the stern. However, the two latter ships apparently were able to limp back to port, for the sinking of neither was confirmed by postwar study of Japanese records. Later in the day, members of Bowfin's crew heard distant explosions and inferred that Billfish was going after the remnants of the convoy, a conclusion that proved to be correct, for their sister ship managed to damage two Japanese ships totaling about 12,000 tons. Although the submarines continued to pursue the remaining enemy vessels as they fled during the night, the battered group of Japanese ships finally managed to slip away in the darkness.

The following morning, after Bowfin's radar had picked up an enemy plane also equipped with radar, the submarine was forced to submerge to avoid detection. Two days later, she came across a 1,400 GRT interisland steamer and shadowed her until reaching a firing position about three hours later. She then launched three torpedoes. One stopped before reaching the target and the other two missed.

On 30 September, as she left the Mindanao Sea, Bowfin chanced upon a diesel-propelled barge carrying over 100 Japanese soldiers; she opened fire on it with her 4-inch gun. When the target responded with machine-gun fire, the submarine's 20 mm guns entered the fray. The battle came to an abrupt end when a 4-inch round struck the enemy's magazine and blew apart the already sinking barge.

On 2 October, as the submarine continued through the Makassar Strait toward Australia, her crew sighted a schooner off Balikpapan. Willingham fired two shots across the stranger's bow, but failed to bring her to and sank her with gunfire.

Bowfin arrived at Fremantle on 10 October, ending a successful patrol. Rear Admiral Ralph Waldo Christie, who commanded American submarines in the area, was lavish in his praise of the submarine's performance; he rewarded her commanding officer with the opportunity of heading a submarine division. To free him for the new role, Lieutenant Commander Walter T. Griffith relieved Willingham as commanding officer of Bowfin on 26 October.

== Second patrol ==
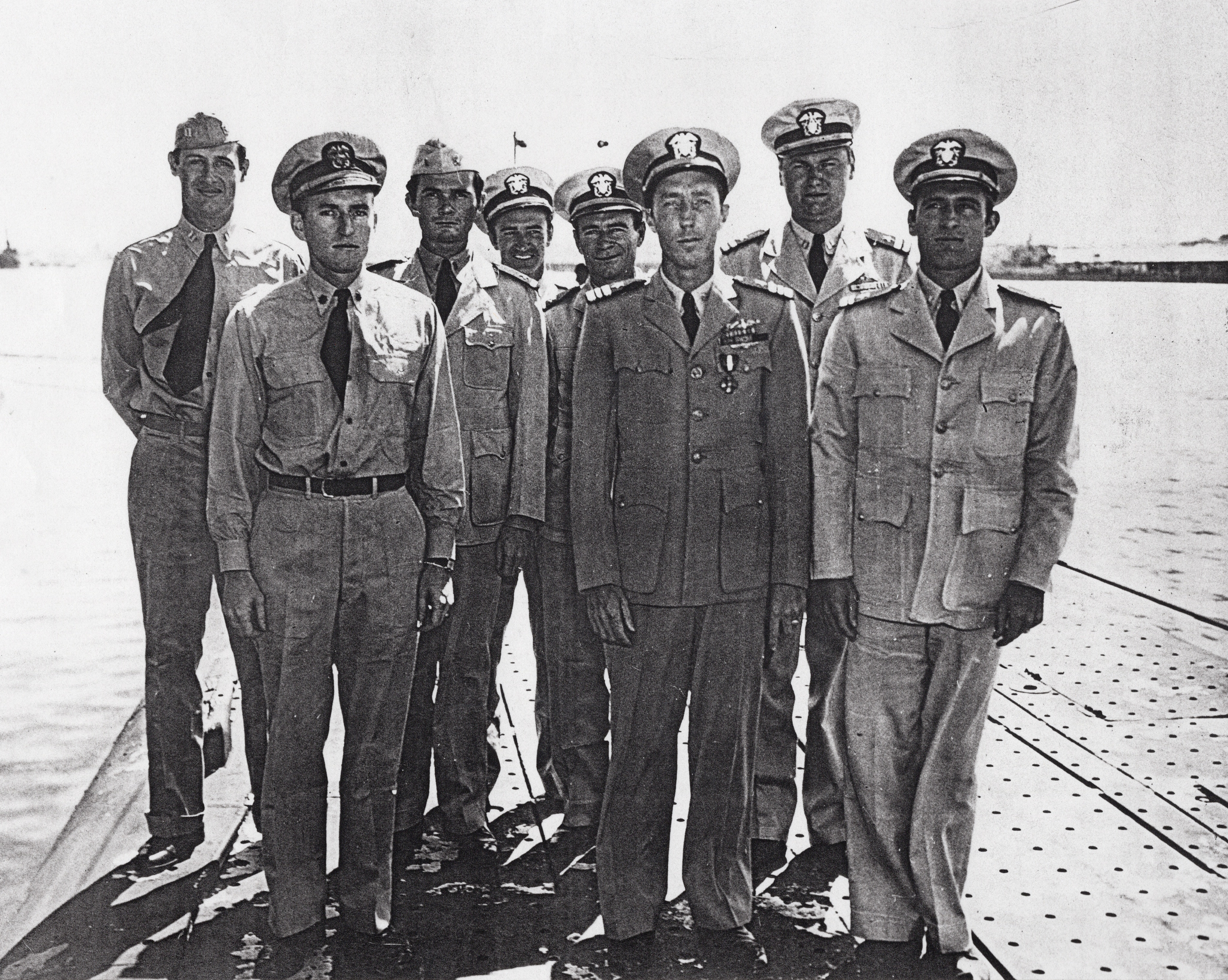
USS Bowfin officers after returning from the second patrol

Upon completion of refitting, Bowfin got underway on 1 November and headed for the South China Sea. From time to time during this patrol, she again cooperated with Billfish. On 8 November, Bowfin picked up the trail of a group of five schooners. When she pulled within range, she opened fire with her 4-inch gun and sank three before bombs from a Japanese plane forced the submarine to dive, allowing the two surviving vessels to slip away. After staying down until dark, Bowfin surfaced and resumed patrolling. Before long, she discovered and opened fire upon a large sailing ship, which went down after suffering hits by two 4-inch shells. Two days later, she found her next victims, two small steamers heading for Tawi-Tawi Bay and set both ablaze with gunfire.

Her luck was even better on the morning of 26 November, while she was approaching the coast of Indochina during a blinding rainstorm. Without prior knowledge that any other vessels were near, she unexpectedly found herself surrounded by Japanese shipping. After barely avoiding a collision with a tanker by backing all engines, she torpedoed and sank the 5,069 GRT tanker Ogurasan Maru and then sank the 5,407 GRT cargo ship Tainan Maru. A few hours later, her torpedoes sank Van Vollenhoven, a 691 GRT coaster that the Japanese had taken from her French owners when they overran Indochina almost two years before. On 28 November, after having sunk a small passenger-cargo ship with one torpedo, Bowfin joined Billfish in attacking a convoy and quickly sank the 5,425 GRT cargo ship Sydney Maru and 9,866 GRT tanker Tonan Maru.

Meanwhile, one of the Japanese ships fired on Bowfin and scored hits, which opened leaks in her starboard induction line; while serious, they did not prevent the submarine from getting off her last two torpedoes. Repair efforts at daylight slowed, but did not completely stop the flooding, and Bowfin began her voyage back to Australia. En route to her base on 2 December, she came across a "two-masted yacht...which...," in Griffith's words, "...looked like it might have been some planter’s yacht taken over by the Japs." The submarine's deck gun promptly destroyed this stranger; thereafter, Bowfin enjoyed an uneventful passage that brought her to Fremantle a week later. There, Rear Admiral Christie praised her performance as the "classic of all submarine patrols".

== Third patrol ==
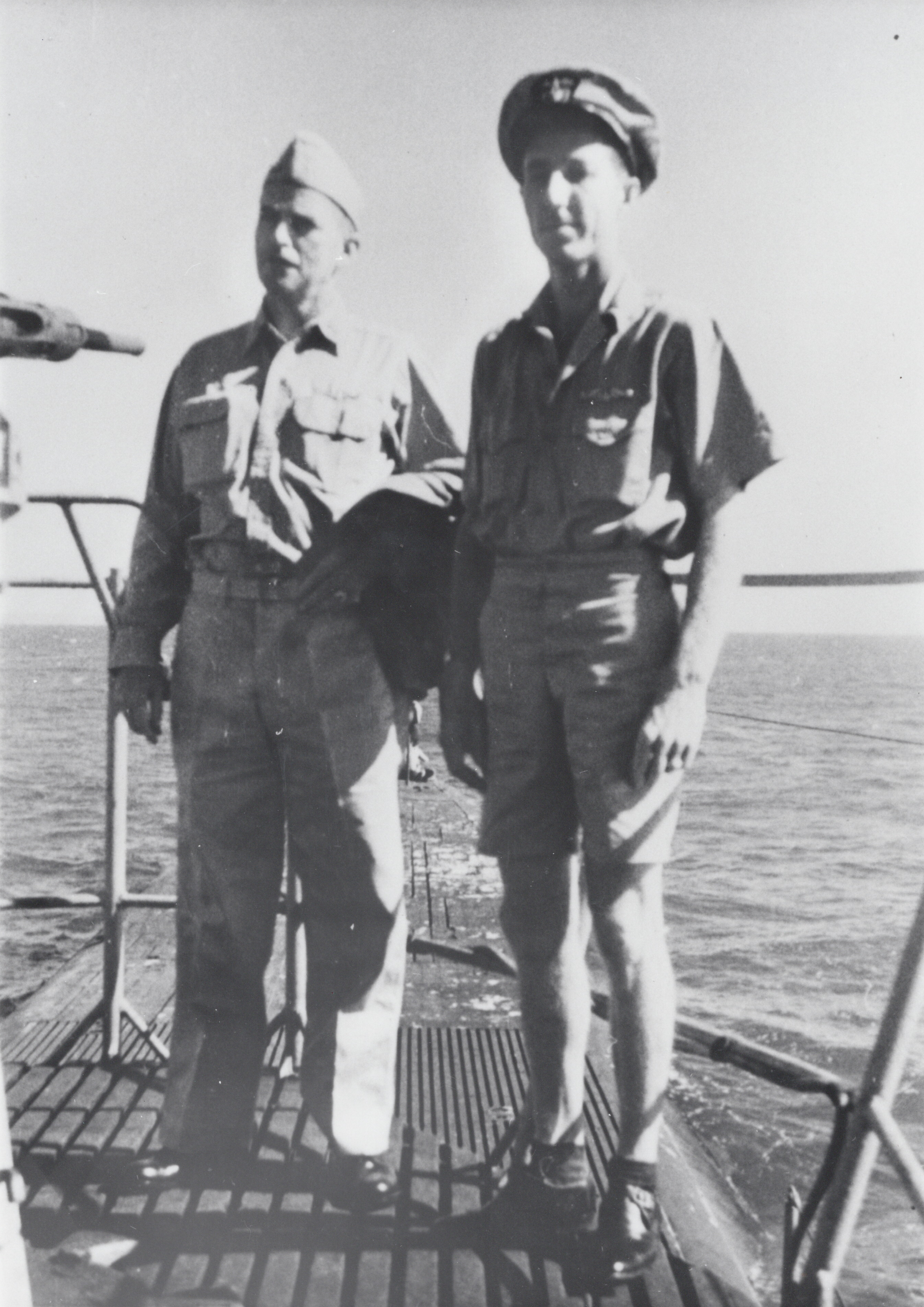
RADM Christie (L) and LCDR Griffith (R) on Bowfin during her third patrol

The submarine got underway on 8 January 1944 for her third war patrol. She proceeded through the Java, Banda, and Flores Seas to Makassar Strait, where, on 16 January, she encountered a small schooner, surfaced, and sank the sailing vessel with her deck gun. The following day, she came across a cargo ship and two escorts, but her attacks on these targets were frustrated by malfunctioning torpedoes. One from her first spread of four bow torpedoes hit and stopped the cargo ship, but the other three missed, and two shots from her bow tubes detonated before reaching the target. After reloading her tubes, she returned to the convoy the following day and finished off the crippled cargo ship with four torpedoes, which sank the 4,408 GRT Shoyu Maru. She also hit one of the escorts with two torpedoes, but did not sink her.

Out of torpedoes, Bowfin returned to Darwin for more, and while in port, picked up Rear Admiral Christie, who remained on board the submarine for the rest of the patrol to check on torpedo performance, firsthand, and to learn the secret of Bowfin's remarkable success. The day after she returned to sea, the submarine put three torpedoes into a small cargo ship. Lt. Comdr. Griffith claimed the target sank and his distinguished passenger confirmed the kill, but the sinking was not borne out by postwar examination of Japanese records, possibly because Bowfin's alleged victim was too small to be listed. Around daybreak on 28 January, Bowfin began trailing a large tanker, and she continued the chase until reaching striking range that evening. She then fired all six bow torpedoes, but since the target simultaneously changed course, none struck home. After a rapid reload, she sent six more toward the tanker, and this time, two exploded against the side of the Japanese ship, sending towers of fire and smoke skyward. Nevertheless, the tanker remained afloat. As Bowfin closed to administer the coup de grace, the enemy ship began fighting back with her main battery and machine-gun fire. Undaunted, the submarine kept up the attack, and during the ensuing 20 minutes, she fired six more torpedoes - two misses, followed by a pair of hits, then a miss, and finally another hit. At this point, the tanker's fire was becoming more accurate and forced the submarine to dive. When she came up, the Japanese vessel was retiring from the scene, and by dawn had disappeared over the horizon.

The next day, Bowfin laid a minefield in Makassar Strait before beginning the voyage back to Australia. On 30 January, she came across two small schooners, which she destroyed with her 4-inch gun. The submarine moored at Fremantle on 5 February and began preparations for her next mission.

== Fourth patrol ==
Underway on 28 February 1944, the submarine headed for the Celebes Sea. On 10 March, her crew sighted a convoy of four ships screened by two escorts. Bowfin fired six bow tubes, but four of the torpedoes exploded prematurely. Japanese planes forced Griffith to dive, thus preventing anyone on board from observing the fate of the two other torpedoes. During the ensuing action, in which the escorts searched for the submarine, and she, in turn, strove to hide at some 350 ft below the surface, a chain dragged by one of the Japanese hunters scraped across Bowfin's hull. Meanwhile, depth-charge explosions – more than 20 – shook the submarine severely, but did no debilitating damage. When Griffith dared to rise to the surface, he saw a cargo ship down by the stern, being taken under tow. Despite the efforts of the enemy escorts and of five circling Japanese aircraft, Bowfin attacked the convoy, but could not follow the progress of her torpedoes because one of them had boomeranged and threatened her by running in a circular pattern. She dived to escape the danger and did not come up again until the next day. She attacked the cargo ship again, but the Japanese escorts drove her down once more. Later that day, she rose to periscope depth, found the damaged ship alone, and finished off the 4,470 GRT Tsukikawa Maru with four torpedoes.

The submarine then began looking for the rest of the convoy, caught up with it well after dark, and fired her remaining torpedoes, but none scored. She then headed back to Darwin for more and stood out to sea again on 15 March with a fresh supply. Three days later, she emptied her bow tubes while attacking a small convoy, but all six either ran under their targets or missed wide of their marks. The inevitable depth-charge barrage followed, but proved to be equally ineffective. When Bowfin attacked again later that day, she launched four torpedoes, all of which were wasted.

She did better on the night of 24 March, when at the end of a long chase, she attacked a five-ship convoy in the Celebes Sea, sinking two cargo ships: 5,139 GRT Sinkyo Maru and 5,395 GRT Bengal Maru. She also damaged a third ship, but could not finish her off for want of torpedoes. As a result, she returned to Darwin, where she arrived on 1 April.

== Fifth and sixth patrols ==
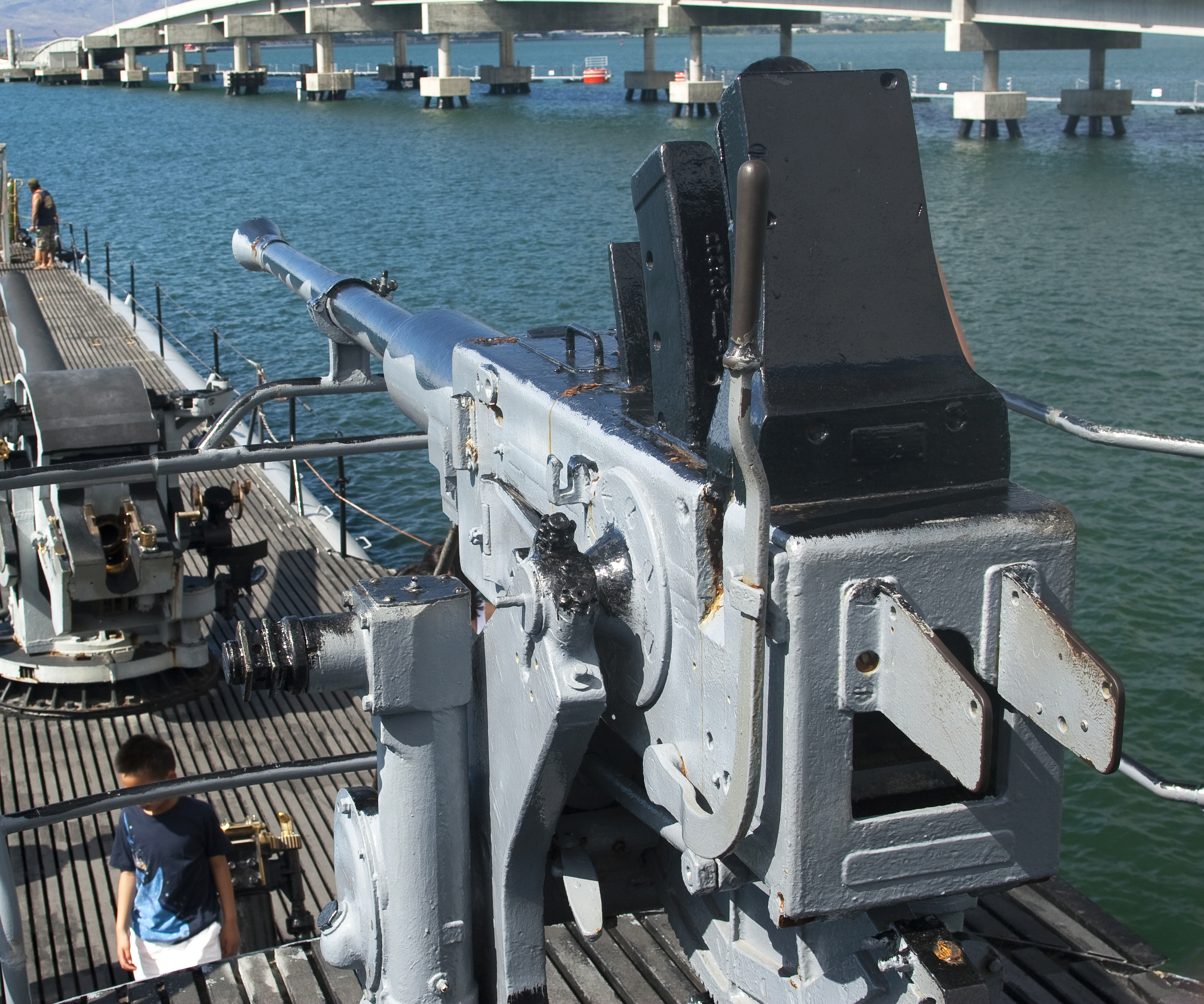
A 40 mm antiaircraft gun

There, Commander John H. Corbus relieved Lt. Cdr. Griffith in command of the submarine, which got underway again on 24 April and headed for the Palaus. Although this sixth patrol proved to be her longest in both time and distance, she only managed to put two torpedoes into a cargo ship on 14 May, and it refused to sink. She performed lifeguard duty before heading, via Midway, for Pearl Harbor, where she arrived on 21 June.

On 16 July, Bowfin left Hawaii and headed for the Ryukyu Islands. She encountered no worthwhile targets until 9 August, when her crew sighted four ships heading for the harbor at Minami Daito. She trailed them into port, and after they had moored, fired her bow torpedoes, blowing up two and damaging a third. A stray torpedo hit a dock, sending a bus careening into the water, later an incident the Cary Grant comedy film Operation Petticoat incorporated into its story line in 1959 (Grant yelling "We sunk a truck!" in the film after an unintentional misfire caused by a nurse on board). However, no sinkings were confirmed by Japanese records, again possibly because of the small size of the alleged victims.

=== The sinking of Tsushima Maru ===
On 22 August, Bowfin attacked a convoy near Akusekijima between 22:00 and 22:30 local time, and claimed several kills, including two destroyers. However, the only ship actually sunk was the 6,754 GRT transport Tsushima Maru. Unknown to the crew of Bowfin, the ship was carrying hundreds of schoolchildren from Okinawa to Kagoshima. According to Tsushima-maru Commemoration Association data, the ship was carrying 1,661 civilian evacuees, including 834 schoolchildren. About 1,484 civilians, including 767 schoolchildren, were killed in the sinking, while 59 children survived. Shortly after the sinking, a "gag order" was enforced, and families and survivors rarely spoke about the incident. The number of victims who have been identified by name, based on notifications from bereaved families (as of 22 August 2012), include 780 schoolchildren.

On 28 August, Bowfin set a trawler afire with her 4-inch gun. However, since she had futilely fired her last four torpedoes at this target before surfacing, the submarine headed via Midway and Pearl Harbor for the US West Coast. She reached San Francisco, California, on 21 September and entered the Mare Island Navy Yard for overhaul.

== Seventh through ninth patrols ==
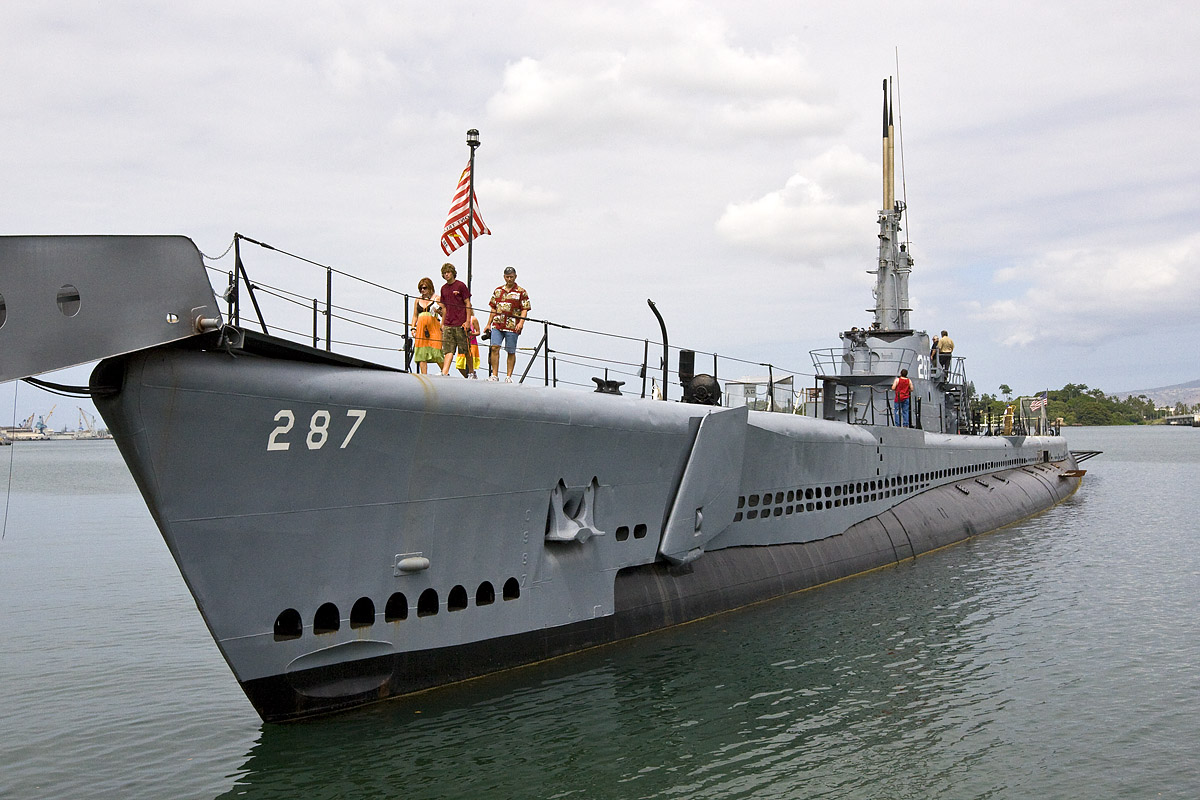
USS Bowfin

At the end of the yard work, Commander Alexander K. Tyree relieved Commander Corbus on 16 December 1944; later that day, the submarine got underway westward back across the Pacific. Following training in Hawaiian waters, she headed for a station near the Japanese home islands south of Honshū, where she performed lifeguard services for American planes – both naval and Army – raiding strategic enemy targets in Japan. On 17 February, Bowfin attacked two Japanese subchasers and sank the 750 GRT Coast Defense Vessel No. 56 with torpedoes and then survived a 26-depth-charge attack by her victim's consort, which had herself barely escaped destruction when some of Bowfin's torpedoes exploded prematurely. The submarine later sank a Japanese sea truck with one torpedo. On 19 March about 15 miles south of Shikoku at 09:30, the submarine was on watch when a lone Navy torpedo bomber with white stars on its wings and tail shot up headed in low toward the submarine. The plane had been hit moments earlier by enemy flak during its bombing run over the Kure Naval Yard. The plane landed in the water dead ahead, about 500 yards off the bow. It floated for two minutes and then nosed down and sank. Both men in the plane jumped out and hung onto an inflated raft. Eleven minutes later, the crew of Bowfin had them aboard. She rescued the pilot, Lieutenant R. U. Plant, and gunner, J. Papazoglakis (Pakis) of the downed Grumman TBF Avenger torpedo bomber of Torpedo Squadron 83 (VT-83) from the aircraft carrier USS Essex. The two men were cold and wet from just a few minutes in that water, but otherwise safe and sound. The captain ordered the life raft sunk and the dye marker destroyed with small arms fire and then resumed patrol on the lifeguard station. The submarine soon set a course for the Marianas and ended the patrol upon her arrival at Guam on 25 March.

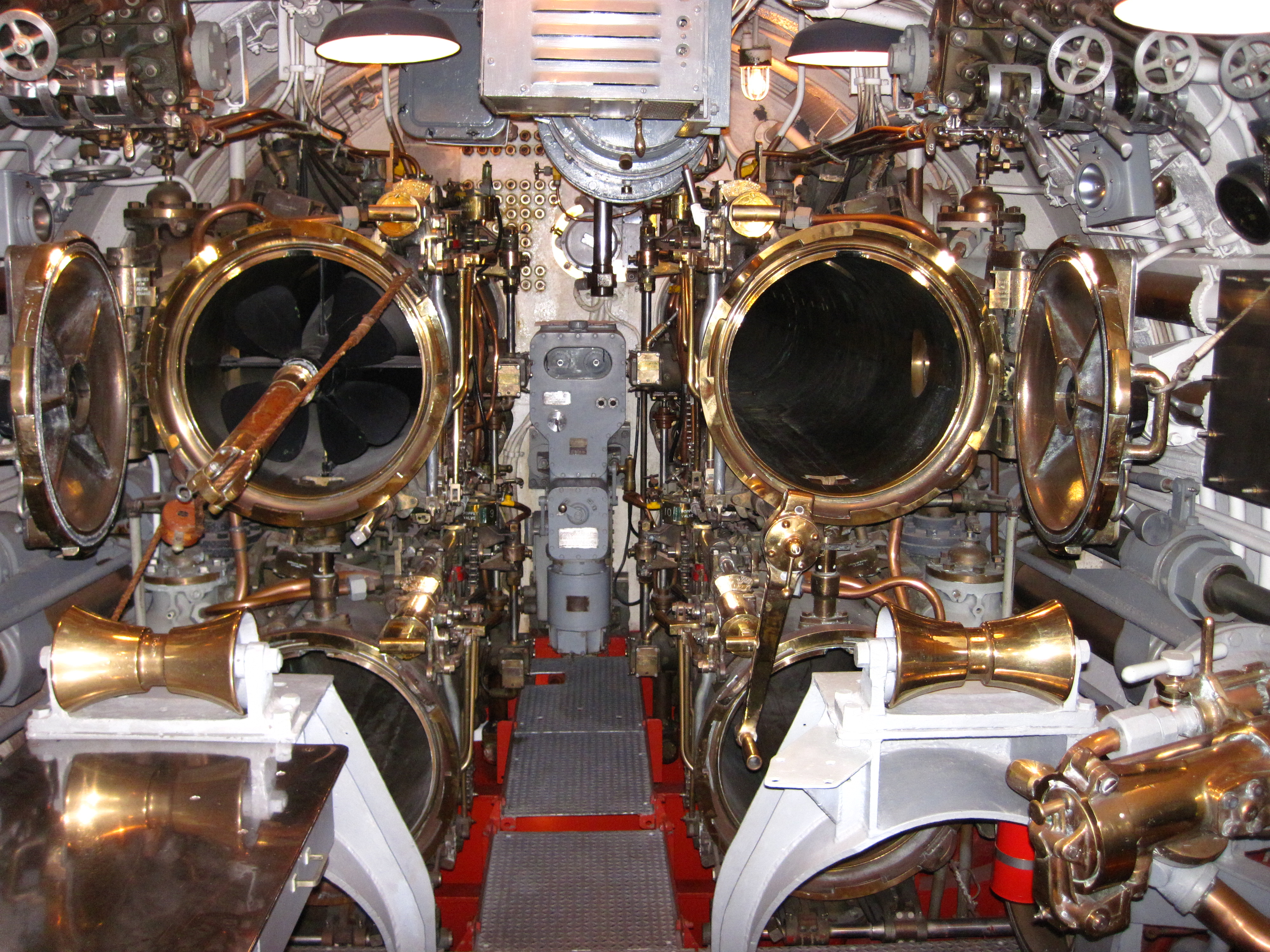
Torpedo tubes

Underway on 23 April for her eighth war patrol, the submarine plied the waters north of Honshū and Hokkaidō. Her first kill came on 1 May, when two of her torpedoes sank the 2,719 GRT transport Chowa Maru. A week later, she overtook, torpedoed, and destroyed the 880 GRT cargo ship Daito Maru No. 3, but that proved to be the last score of the patrol. After a fortnight of futile searching for targets, she arrived at Apra Harbor, Guam, for refit.

While training for her ninth and final patrol of the war, Bowfin rescued a Marine Corps pilot whose fighter had crashed. She got underway on 29 May and set course for Japan. One of nine submarines protected by newly developed mine-detecting sonar and sent into the Sea of Japan, she threaded her way through the minefields of Tsushima Strait, which guarded this previously sacrosanct maritime heart of the Japanese Empire, but found little enemy shipping. Nevertheless, she wasted neither of her two possible contacts; the first, the 1,898 GRT cargo ship Shinyō Maru No. 3, took four torpedoes before sinking on 11 June; and the second, the 887 GRT cargo ship Akiura Maru, met a similar fate on 13 June.

The submarine left the Sea of Japan by La Pérouse Strait (Soya Misaki) and headed for Hawaii. She reached Pearl Harbor on Independence Day and began preparations to return to action. Early in August, Bowfin sailed for the Marianas, her staging point for her 10th war patrol. However, while en route, she received word of Japan's capitulation. As a result, she reversed course and returned to Hawaii and then headed for the Panama Canal on her way to the East Coast of the United States. Bowfin arrived at Tompkinsville, Staten Island, New York, on 21 September 1945. She served in the Atlantic Fleet until decommissioned at New London on 12 February 1947 and placed in reserve.

== Post-war career ==
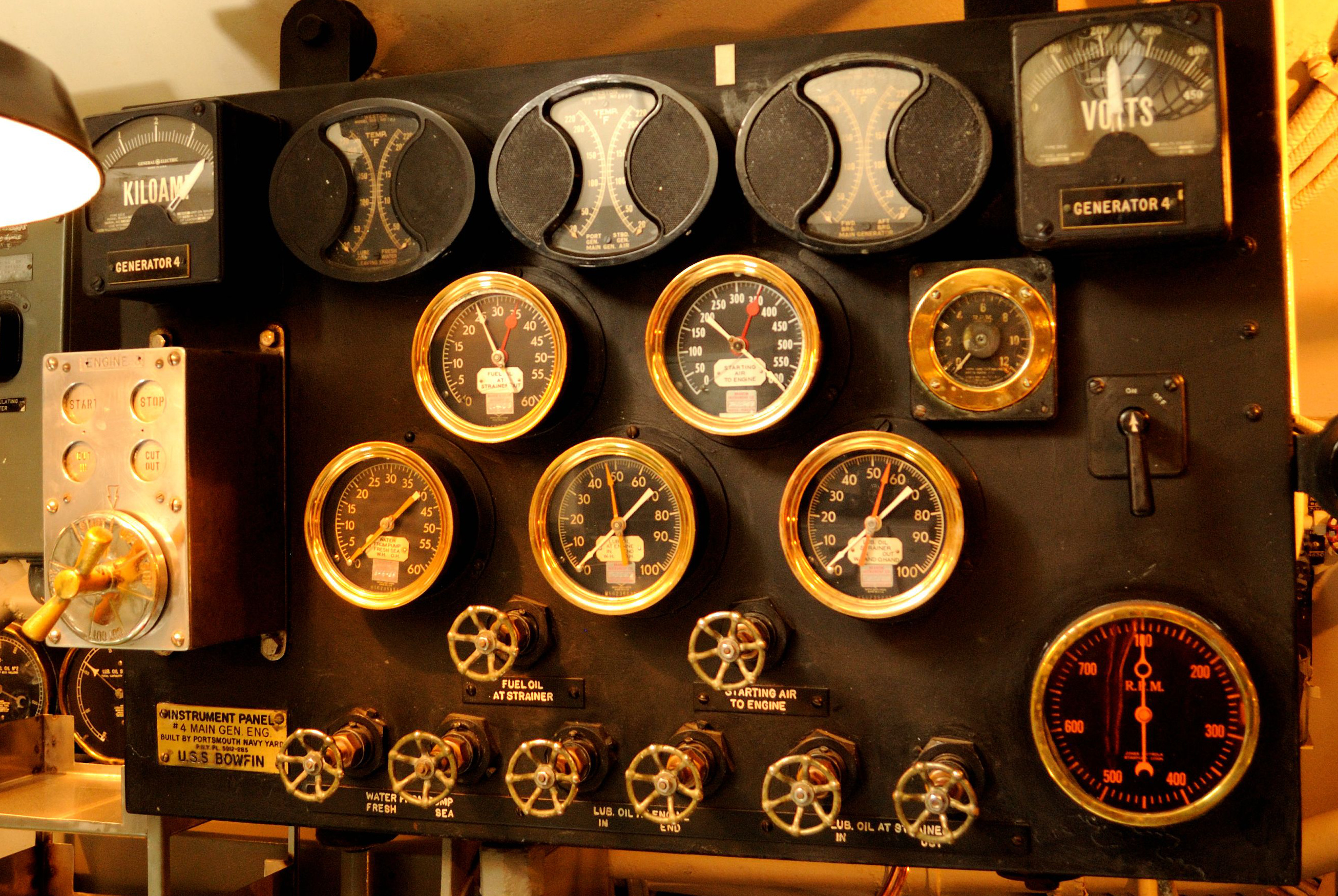
USS Bowfin - Instrument Panel #4 Main Generator Engine

Reactivated because of the Navy's need to expand the fleet to support United Nations-led forces during the Korean War, the submarine was recommissioned on 27 July 1951, and following shakedown training, sailed for the Pacific. After arriving at San Diego, California, on 6 October, she worked from that port for the next two years, devoting her time to training operations and local exercises. The nominal ending of hostilities in Korea in the summer of 1953 reduced the Navy's need for active submarines and prompted Bowfin's second inactivation. She arrived at San Francisco on 8 October 1953 and was placed out of commission, in reserve, at the Mare Island Naval Shipyard on 22 April 1954. The warship remained there until moving to Seattle, Washington, on 1 May 1960 to replace Puffer as the Naval Reserve training submarine there and to begin a little over a decade's service. Her name was finally stricken from the Navy list on 1 December 1971.

== Museum ship ==
In early 1972, CINCPACFLT Admiral Bernard A. Clarey and COMSUBPAC Rear Admiral Paul L. Lacy, Jr. (who had both commanded submarines during World War II), approached Secretary of the Navy John Chafee and Senators Henry M. Jackson and Daniel Inouye about acquiring Bowfin to be the centerpiece of a memorial to American submariners at Pearl Harbor. Bowfin's nickname of "the Pearl Harbor Avenger" (stemming from her launch date one year after the attack on Pearl Harbor) made the submarine an appropriate choice for the location. Bowfin was towed to Pearl Harbor in June 1972, but difficulty in securing a suitable mooring site delayed the memorial efforts for several years.

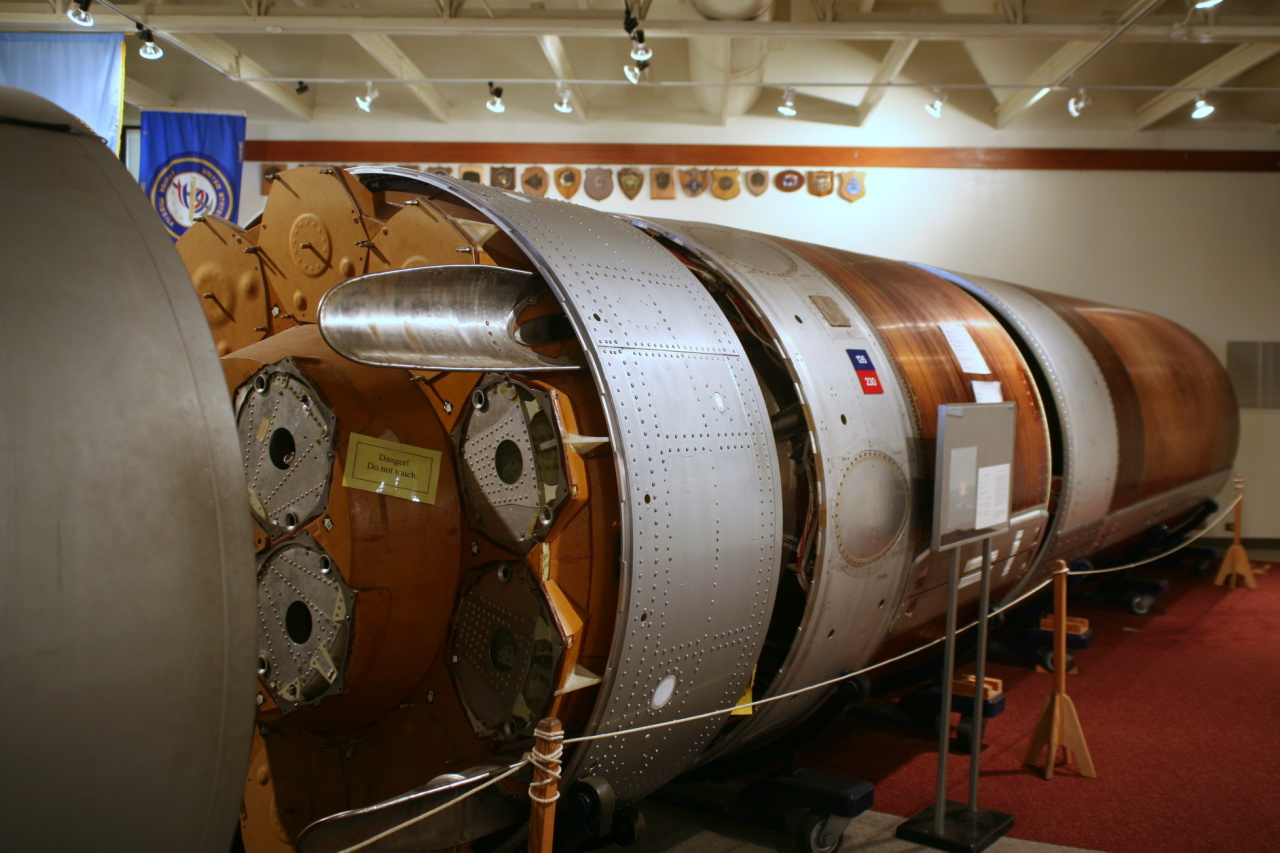
A UGM-73 Poseidon submarine-launched ballistic missile on display at the USS Bowfin Submarine Museum and Park prior to the 2019-2021 renovation

In 1978, the Pacific Fleet Submarine Memorial Association (PFSMA) was formed in Hawaii to oversee the memorial. In August 1979, the PFSMA formally acquired Bowfin from the United States Navy and began restoration work to return Bowfin to her World War II configuration. The submarine was opened to the public at Pearl Harbor on 1 April 1981, with visitors able to tour the outside and first deck. Bowfin was declared a National Historic Landmark in 1986. Construction of a museum building adjacent to the submarine began in 1986 and opened in 1988. The museum inherited many artifacts from the defunct Pacific Submarine Museum previously located at the Pearl Harbor subbase from 1970 to 1987. At this time, the memorial was known as the USS Bowfin Submarine Museum and Park.

Until the 2010s, Bowfin Park was separated from the nearby USS Arizona Memorial ferry launch by a parking lot. In 2010, an expanded Pearl Harbor Visitors Center opened, which created a new waterfront walk that links Bowfin Park with the ferry launch. The Visitor Center also contains a stop for shuttle buses that provide access to the Battleship Missouri Memorial and Pearl Harbor Aviation Museum. Although the entrance to Bowfin is now accessed through the grounds of the Visitor Center (which is administered by the National Park Service), the PFSMA maintains control of their part of the campus.

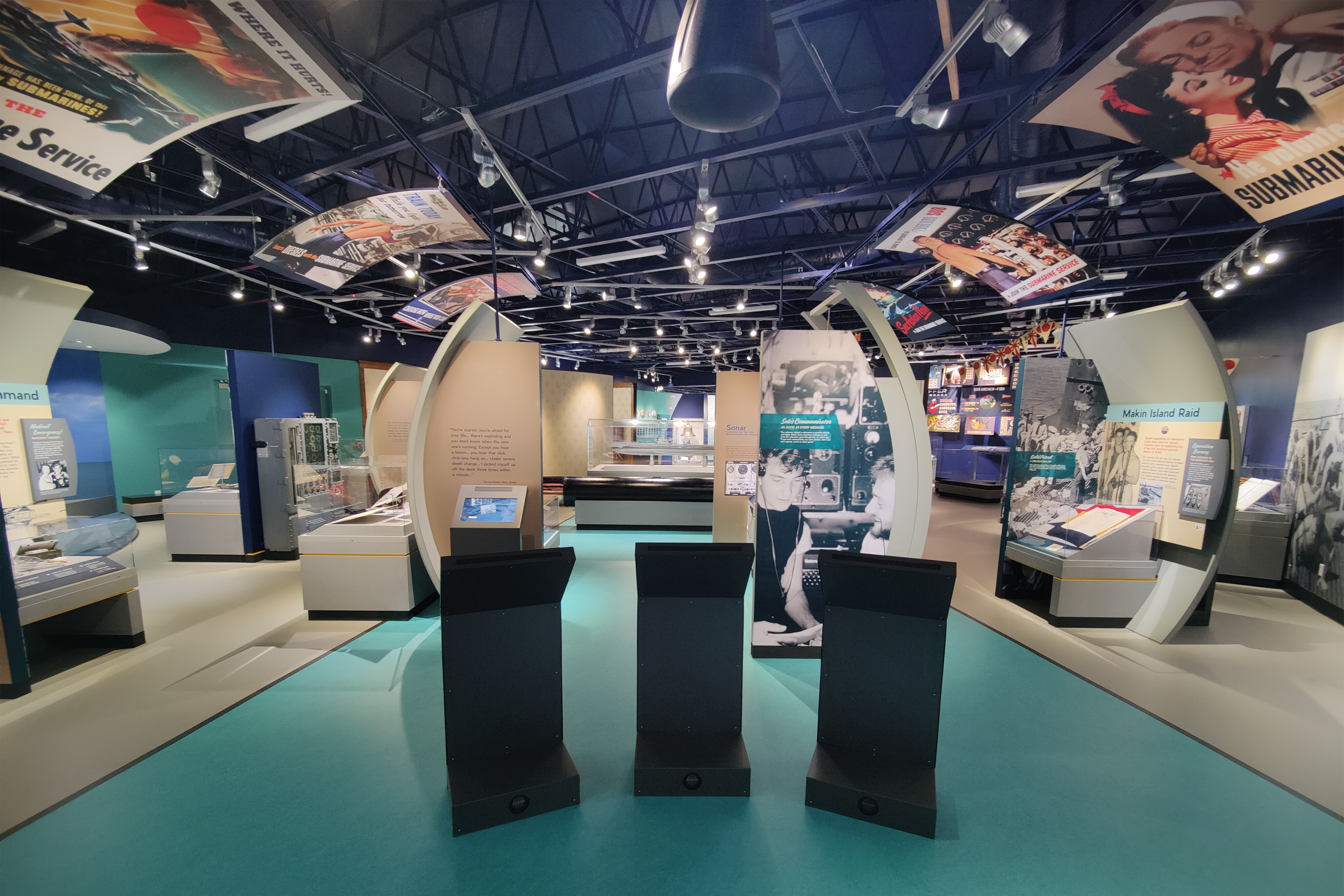
The World War II gallery of the Pacific Fleet Submarine Museum after the 2019-2021 renovation

In 2019, the museum portion of Bowfin Park closed for an extensive, $20 million renovation, while the submarine remained accessible. The museum building reopened in 2021, and the campus as a whole was renamed the Pacific Fleet Submarine Museum. The renovated museum features exhibits and artifacts about submarines and the history of the United States Submarine Service from World War II to the modern day, including detailed models, weapon systems, photographs, paintings, battleflags, recruiting posters, and a memorial honoring the 52 American submarines and the more than 3,500 submariners lost during World War II. Additionally, a 43-foot-diameter "hull ring" structure meant to represent the future Columbia-class ballistic missile submarine was installed outside the museum, replacing the two UGM-27 Polaris missiles previously displayed there. Other outside exhibits include a Kaiten manned torpedo, SSM-N-8 Regulus cruise missile, and the internal conning tower of USS Parche.

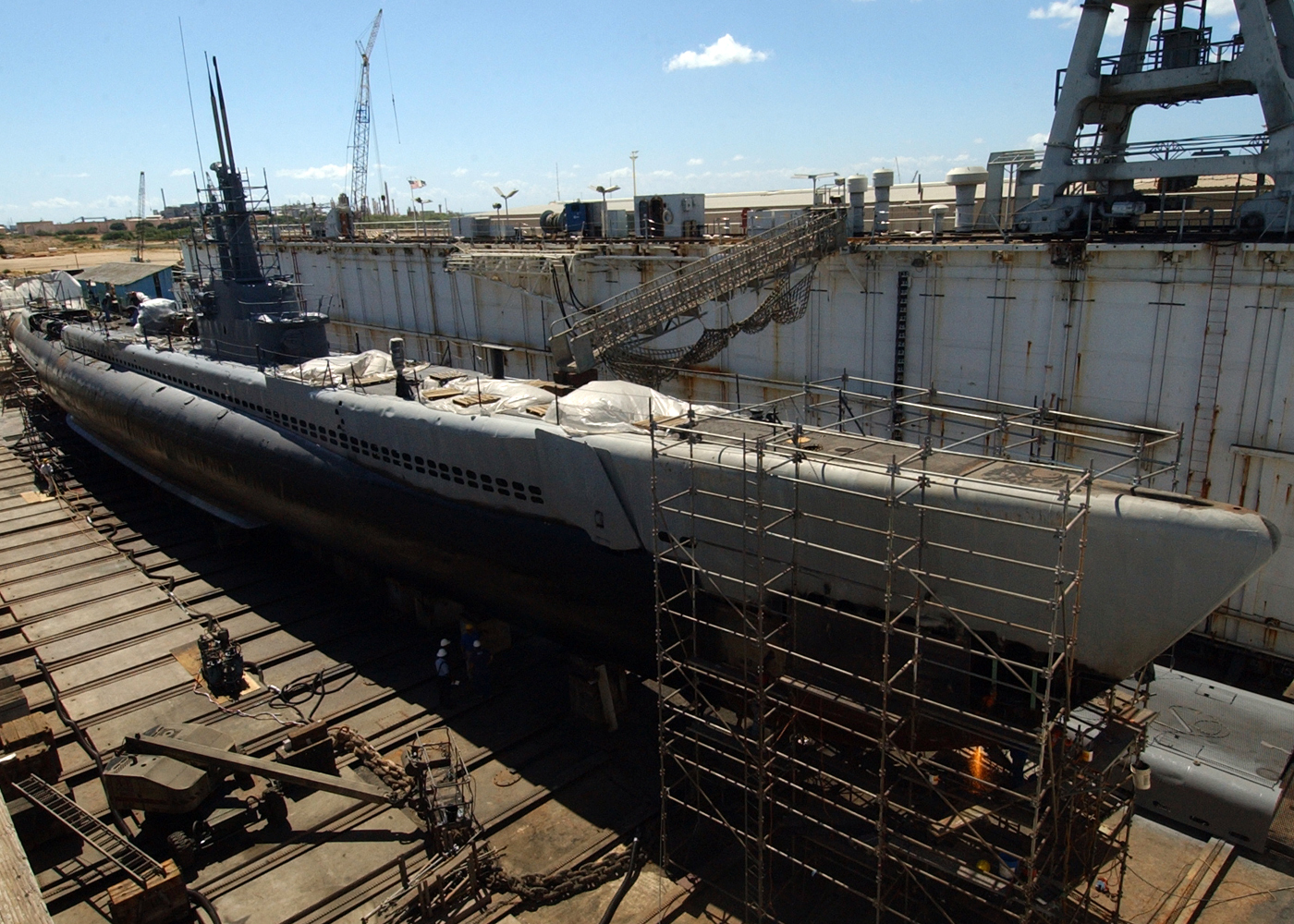
Bowfin in drydock undergoing restoration, 2004

Bowfin has been drydocked for preservation work three times since becoming a museum ship. In 1987, she was drydocked and refitted to be used as a floating location to portray three different submarines in the epic miniseries War and Remembrance. She was drydocked again in 2004, and a third time in 2022.

== In popular culture ==
Bowfin was the subject of a 1958 episode of the TV series The Silent Service entitled "The Bowfin Story", which dramatized Bowfin's second war patrol. Like most episodes of The Silent Service, the submarine scenes were actually filmed aboard the Gato-class USS Sawfish. Former Bowfin commanding officer Rear Admiral Walter T. Griffith made an appearance at the end of the episode with host Rear Admiral Thomas M. Dykers.

Bowfin was one of several submarines featured in the 1985 MicroProse computer game Silent Service. The game allows players to re-enact Bowfin's second war patrol.

Since becoming a museum ship, Bowfin has appeared in several documentaries and media productions. In the 1988 miniseries War and Remembrance, Bowfin depicted the fictional American submarines USS Devilfish and USS Moray. In 2007, interior shots of Bowfin were filmed for the third season of Lost. Bowfin was also used as a filming location for the 2019 film Midway, in which she depicted USS Nautilus.

== Sunken enemy vessels ==
- The passenger-cargo ship Kirishima Maru on 25 September 1943
- The tanker Ogurasan Maru and cargo ship Tainan Maru on 26 November 1943
- The Vichy France cargo ship Van Vollenhoven on 26 November or 27 November 1943
- The passenger-cargo ship Sydney Maru and the 9,866 GRT tanker Tonan Maru on 28 November 1943
- A pair of schooners she destroyed with her four-inch gun on 30 November (1943)
- The cargo ship Shoyu Maru on 17 January 1944
- The cargo ship Tsukikawa Maru on 10 March 1944
- The cargo ships Shinkyo Maru and Bengal Maru on 24 March 1944
- The passenger-cargo ship Tsushima Maru on 22 August 1944
- Assisted Aspro in the sinking of the 4,500 GRT cargo ship Bisan Maru on 14 May 1944
- The frigate Coastal Defense Vessel No. 56 on 17 February 1945
- The auxiliary patrol boat Chōkai Maru on 2 March 1945
- The passenger-cargo ship Chowa Maru on 1 May 1945
- The cargo ship Daito Maru No. 3 on 8 May 1945
- The cargo ship Shinyō Maru No. 3 on 11 June 1945
- The cargo ship Akiura Maru on 13 June 1945

== See also ==
- List of maritime museums in the United States
