= USS Nereus (AS-17) =

Tender of the United States Navy

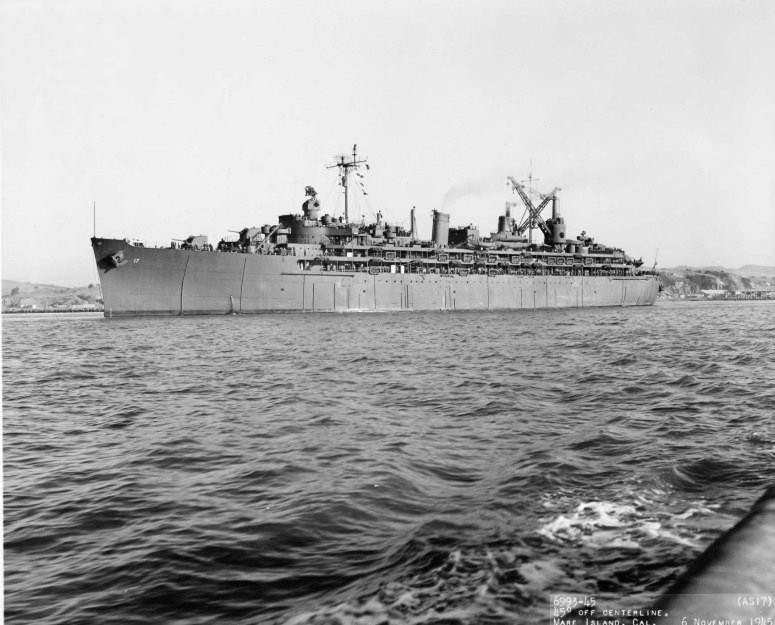
- USS Nereus in 1945

History

United States
- Name: USS Nereus (AS-17)
- Namesake: Nereus
- Builder: Mare Island Navy Yard
- Laid down: 12 October 1943
- Launched: 12 February 1945
- Commissioned: 27 October 1945
- Decommissioned: 27 October 1971
- Fate: Scrapped, 2012

General characteristics
- Class & type: Fulton-class submarine tender
- Displacement: 9,250 long tons (9,398 t) light; 16,550 long tons (16,816 t) full load
- Length: 529 ft 6 in (161.39 m)
- Beam: 73 ft 4 in (22.35 m)
- Draft: 26 ft 6 in (8.08 m)
- Speed: 15 knots (28 km/h; 17 mph)
- Complement: 1,217
- Armament: 4 × 5"/38 caliber guns; 4 × 40 mm guns; 8 × 20 mm guns

USS Nereus (AS-17) was a Fulton-class submarine tender in service with the United States Navy from 1945 to 1971. She was scrapped in 2012.

== History ==
According to Greek mythology, Nereus was the eldest son of Pontus and Gaia, and one of the manifestations of the Old Man of the Sea. Nereus was laid down on 12 October 1943, at Mare Island Navy Yard, Vallejo, California; launched 12 February 1945; sponsored by Mrs. A. M. Hurst; and commissioned on 27 October 1945. She was the third vessel to bear the name.

=== 1945–1960 ===
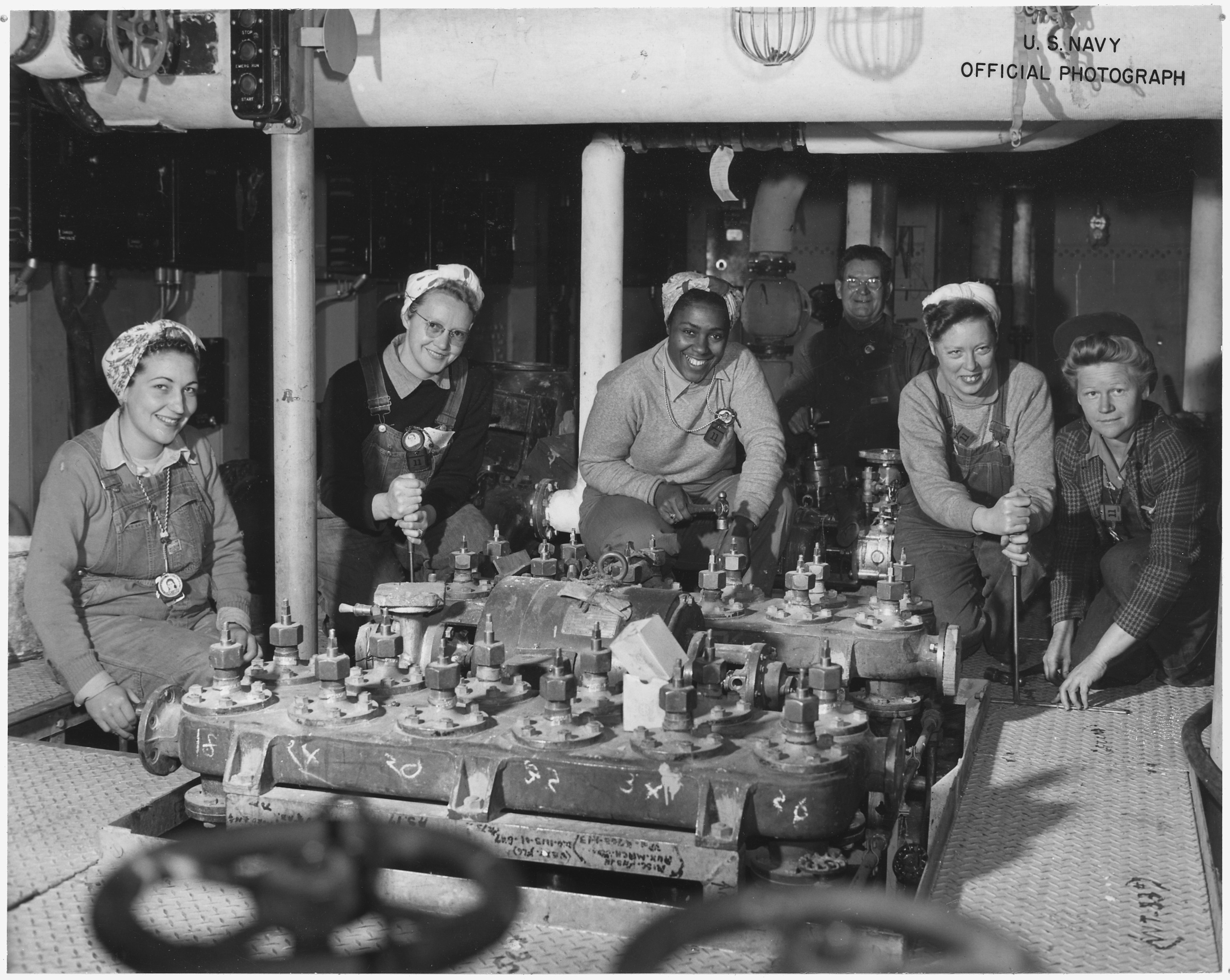
Shipfitters on the Nereus (1943)

After shakedown in the fall of 1945, the new submarine tender departed 15 December for Japan by way of Pearl Harbor. Arriving Sasebo early in 1946, she stripped 39 Japanese submarines of all usable equipment and material before they were towed to sea for scuttling. US Marine demolition crews then sank the submarines with explosive charges in Operation "Roads End", 1–2 April.

After leaving Sasebo, she then proceeded to Subic Bay with stops in Nagasaki and Manila. At Subic, the crew loaded torpedoes for transport back to the US.

Soon underway for home, she arrived in San Diego, California, on 13 May for a year of submarine service and repair work. On 28 June 1947 she got underway for Operation "Blue Nose." This cruise was entirely novel for a submarine tender. Together with the submarines Boarfish (SS-327), Caiman (SS-323), and Cabezon (SS-334), Nereus was assigned to TG 17.3. On 15 July she left for the Aleutian Islands where Rear Admiral Alan R. McCann, Commander Submarine Force Pacific came aboard. The group was underway again 25 July, this time for the Pribiloff Islands. During this transit Army Air Force aircraft based at Adak took part in the antisubmarine training. On 30 July Nereus passed through the Bering Strait and crossed the Arctic Circle.

Following along the International Date Line, the ships of Operation Blue Nose sighted pack ice on the morning of 1 August 1947. After reaching 72’15’ north latitude, the ships continued independently along the ice pack to determine its shape.

Before returning to her home port of San Diego, Nereus visited Norton Bay, Kodiak, Juneau, and Vancouver The cruise was followed by the ship's first overhaul, at Mare Island.

Starting in 1948 Nereus was primarily engaged in submarine repair and services at San Diego. On 24 April, Vice Admiral George D. Murray, Task Fleet commander, using Nereus as his flagship, announced six days of combat training exercises to take place the following week between San Diego and San Pedro. He expected to hoist his flag aboard cruiser Saint Paul for the exercises, involving 20,000 men, 30 ships and hundreds of planes. “The fleet will concentrate on testing new weapons and techniques, Murray said.”

During the next two decades, Nereus made occasional cruises to Pearl Harbor; to Acapulco, Mexico; and various west coast ports. In 1948 she was camera-ship photographing the sinking of cruiser Salt Lake City (CA-25) some 130 miles off the west coast. In the spring of 1955, she accompanied submarines Tunny (SSG-282), Carbonero (SS-337) and Cusk (SS-348) to Pearl Harbor and acted as observer ship and advance base headquarters during the first firing of operational missiles from submarines.

=== 1960–1971 ===
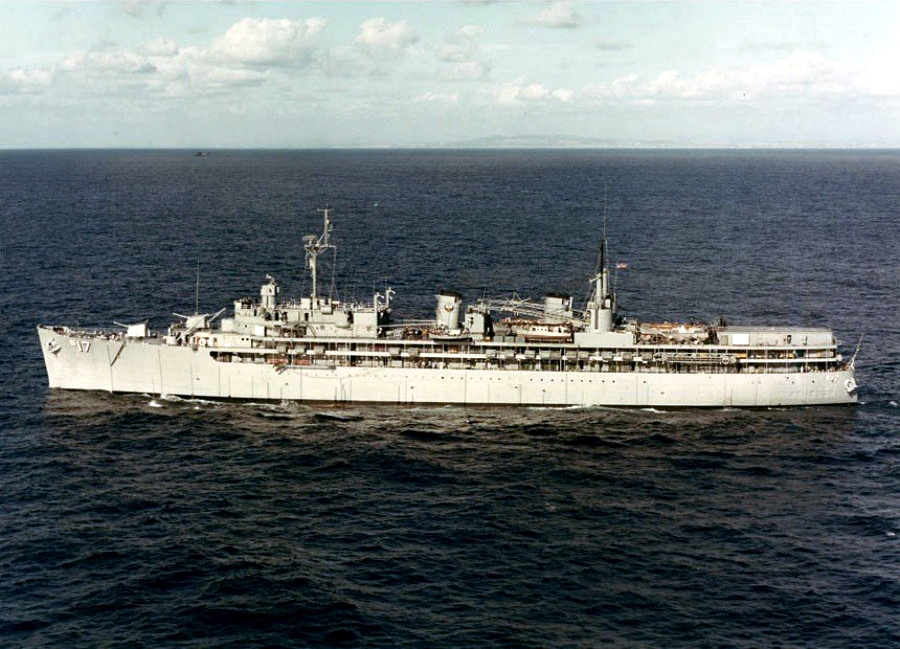
Nereus in 1966.

In November 1960 Halibut (SSGN-587) came alongside Nereus, the first nuclear submarine to be serviced by a tender on the west coast. The following year she ministered to fleet ballistic missile (Polaris) submarine Theodore Roosevelt. In the fall of 1964, Nereus provided underwater support for the operational evaluation of the ASROC weapons system. Two years later her versatility in servicing Shields (DD-596) won her praise from ComSubPac, and the destroyer's captain.

Nereus entered the U.S. Naval Shipyard at Mare Island on 1 November for overhaul until 7 April 1967. Following refresher training she reported to ComSubFlot 1 for duty on 11 May. That month she visited Acapulco, Mexico, and became flagship for ComSubFlot 1 and ComSubRon 5. In the fall of 1967, UNIVAC 1500 data processing equipment was installed to speed the tender operations. Into 1970 the tender served the submarines of the Pacific Fleet keeping them at peak readiness.

Nereus was later decommissioned in 1971, and, as of July 2012, it was to leave the Maritime Administration's Reserve Fleet at Suisun Bay to be broken apart at ESCO Marine Inc. in Brownsville, Texas (USA), after being scrubbed of marine growth & loose exterior paint in the dry docks of Allied Defense Recycling (California Dry Dock Solutions) at Mare Island.

== Awards ==
- Asiatic-Pacific Campaign Medal
- World War II Victory Medal
- Navy Occupation Medal
- National Defense Service Medal with star
