= Operation Blue Nose =

Operation Blue Nose was a 1947 U.S. Naval mission to explore under the Polar ice cap in the Chukchi Sea in the Arctic using submarines. The operation consisted of the submarines USS BOARFISH (SS-327), USS CAIMAN (SS-323), and USS CABEZON (SS-334), and submarine tender USS NEREUS (AS-17) took part in CTG 17.3. Operation Blue Nose operated under-ice in the Chukchi Sea were under the command of RADM Allan R. McCann, Commander, Submarine Force, U.S. Pacific or COMSUBPAC.

USS BOARFISH was the flagship and was specially equipped and trained in the U.S. Navy's effort to explore and develop submarine under-ice operational capability in the harsh arctic environment. Special sonar developed by the Arctic Submarine Laboratory was installed on USS BOARFISH. Dr. Waldo K. Lyon, ASL founder was on board to operate the sonar and to conduct other testing for the operation.

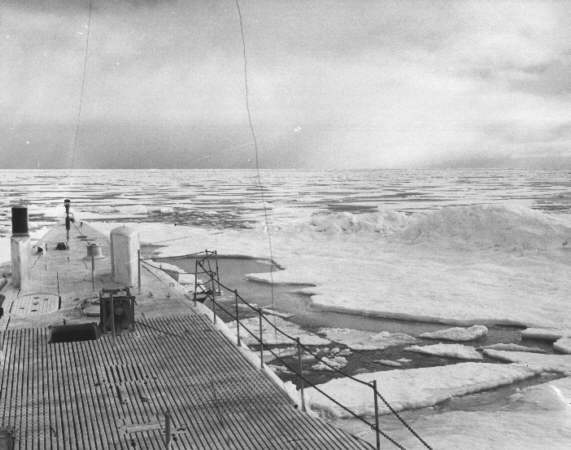
Boarfish (SS-327), Chukchi Sea, 1947 USN photo courtesy of the US Navy Arctic Submarine Laboratory.

== Explorations ==
On August 1, 1947, USS BOARFISH conducted the first under-ice transit of an ice floe in the Chukchi Sea, which was relatively unexplored at the time, while the other ships mapped its perimeter. At 2:39 PM at 72° 05' N 168° 42' W BOARFISH commenced a stationary dive and underwater transit of the ice floe. The transit took over an hour and average ice thickness was eight to ten feet thick with the deepest reading being eighteen feet thick. When she got to the other side she conducted a vertical surface. Due to the high risk of placing the submarine in danger for science, RADM McCann was on board to take responsibility if something went wrong.

Over the next few weeks the task group mapped additional ice floes with the longest one being 12 nm long and with a max ice keel depth of 50 ft. They went as far north as 72° 15' N.

USS BOARFISH demonstrated that extended under-ice navigation was entirely practical. Afterwards Dr. Lyon concluded, “I believe that the problem of submarine adaptation to polar seas has been formulated and that the submarine shows promise of unusual tactical advantage.”
