= USS Capitaine =

Balao-class submarine

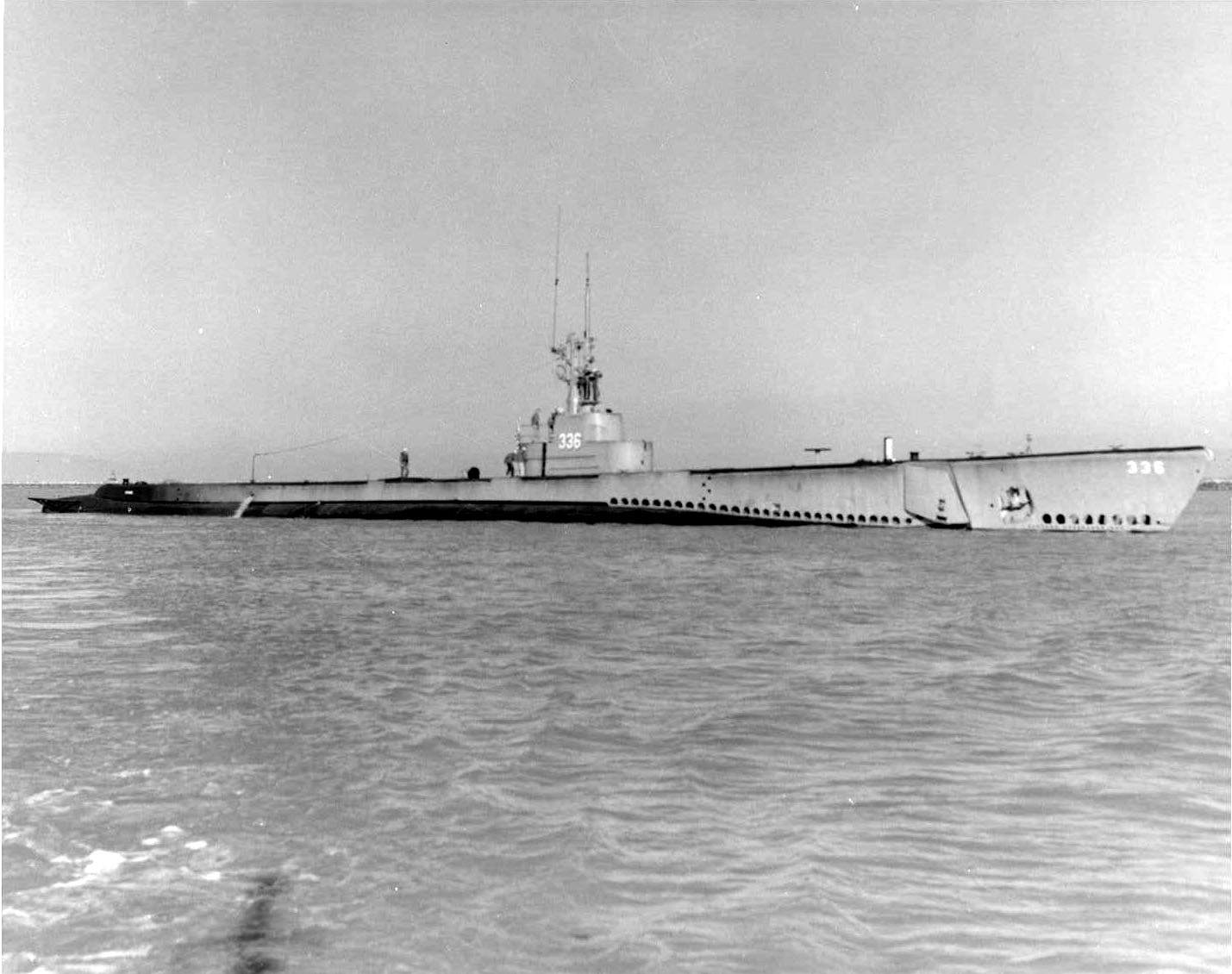
- Capitaine (SS-336), probably off the coast of California, 1947.

History

United States
- Name: USS Capitaine (SS-336)
- Builder: Electric Boat Company, Groton, Connecticut
- Laid down: 2 December 1943
- Launched: 1 October 1944
- Commissioned: 26 January 1945
- Decommissioned: 10 February 1950
- Recommissioned: 23 February 1957
- Decommissioned: 4 March 1966
- Stricken: 5 December 1977
- Fate: Transferred to Italy, 5 March 1966, sold to Italy 5 December 1977 and disposed of

History

Italy
- Name: Alfredo Cappellini (S 507)
- Commissioned: 5 March 1966
- Out of service: 5 December 1977

General characteristics
- Class & type: Balao class diesel-electric submarine
- Displacement: 1,526 tons (1,550 t) surfaced; 2,424 tons (2,463 t) submerged
- Length: 311 ft 9 in (95.02 m)
- Beam: 27 ft 3 in (8.31 m)
- Draft: 16 ft 10 in (5.13 m) maximum
- Propulsion: 4 × General Motors Model 16-278A V16 diesel engines driving electrical generators; 2 × 126-cell Sargo batteries; 4 × high-speed General Electric electric motors with reduction gears; 2 × propellers; 5,400 shp (4.0 MW) surfaced; 2,740 shp (2.0 MW) submerged
- Speed: 20.25 knots (38 km/h) surfaced; 8.75 knots (16 km/h) submerged
- Range: 11,000 nautical miles (20,000 km) surfaced at 10 knots (19 km/h)
- Endurance: 48 hours at 2 knots (3.7 km/h) submerged; 75 days on patrol
- Test depth: 400 ft (120 m)
- Complement: 10 officers, 70–71 enlisted
- Armament: 10 × 21-inch (533 mm) torpedo tubes; 6 forward, 4 aft; 24 torpedoes; 1 × 5-inch (127 mm) / 25 caliber deck gun; Bofors 40 mm and Oerlikon 20 mm cannon

USS Capitaine (SS/AGSS-336), a Balao-class submarine, was a ship of the United States Navy named for the capitaine, a brilliantly colored fish inhabiting waters of the Atlantic Ocean from North Carolina to Panama.

== Construction and commissioning ==
Capitaine (SS-336) was launched 1 October 1944 by Electric Boat Co., Groton, Conn.; sponsored by Mrs. J. A. Rondomanski; commissioned 26 January 1945, Lieutenant Commander E. S. Friedrick in command; and assigned to the Pacific Fleet.

=== United States Navy ===
==== World War II ====
Capitaine got underway from New London 7 March 1945 to arrive at Pearl Harbor 15 April. On 6 May, she cleared for her first war patrol, off the coast of French Indochina north of Saigon. Enemy targets were disappointingly few for a new submarine, for the Navy had almost completely swept the sea of Japanese shipping by this time.

On 16 June, she rescued from the sea five Japanese survivors of a merchant ship previously sunk by other forces. After refueling at Subic Bay, Capitaine continued her patrol south of Borneo in the Java Sea. On 30 June, she joined Baya (SS-318) in a concerted gun attack on five small enemy craft, one (Bandai Maru) which she sank after its crew had abandoned it.

Refitted at Fremantle submarine base, Western Australia, Capitaine sailed for her second war patrol, arriving in her assigned area just three days before hostilities ended.

==== Post-war ====
She returned to the west coast in September 1945, but in January 1946 was bound for the Far East once more, training in Philippine waters through March. A month of operations at Pearl Harbor preceded her return to San Diego, from which, after an overhaul, she made two simulated war patrols in 1947 and 1948, and conducted local training and services. The submarine was decommissioned and placed in reserve at Mare Island Naval Shipyard 10 February 1950.

Capitaine was recommissioned 23 February 1957, and reported to the Pacific Fleet a month later. From her base at San Diego, she took part in training, served other fleet units as target in antisubmarine exercises, and training reservists, as well as voyaging to the Far East for 7th Fleet duty, through 1960. On 1 July 1960 Capitaine was reclassified an Auxiliary Research Submarine, AGSS-336.

In 1964 Capitaine took part in the movie In Harm's Way.

==== Honors and awards ====
- Asiatic-Pacific Campaign Medal with one battle star for World War II service
- Navy Occupation Service Medal with "ASIA" clasp

=== Italian Navy ===
Capitaine was decommissioned, 4 March 1966 and transferred (loaned) to Italy, 5 March 1966, where she was recommissioned in the Italian Navy as Alfredo Cappellini (S 507). She was sold to Italy and struck from the US Naval Register, 5 December 1977, and disposed of.

== Fiction related to Capitaine ==
The fictional submarine USS Triggerfish in the 1951 movie Submarine Command has Capitaine's hull number (SS-336).
