= La Posta Astro-Geophysical Observatory =

Radio telescope installation in Campo, California

Coordinates: 32.6777°N 116.4360°W

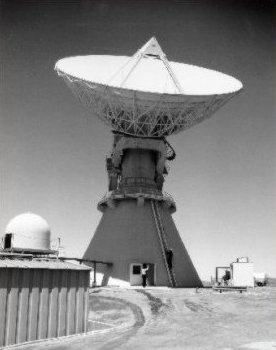
La Posta Astro-Geophysical Observatory

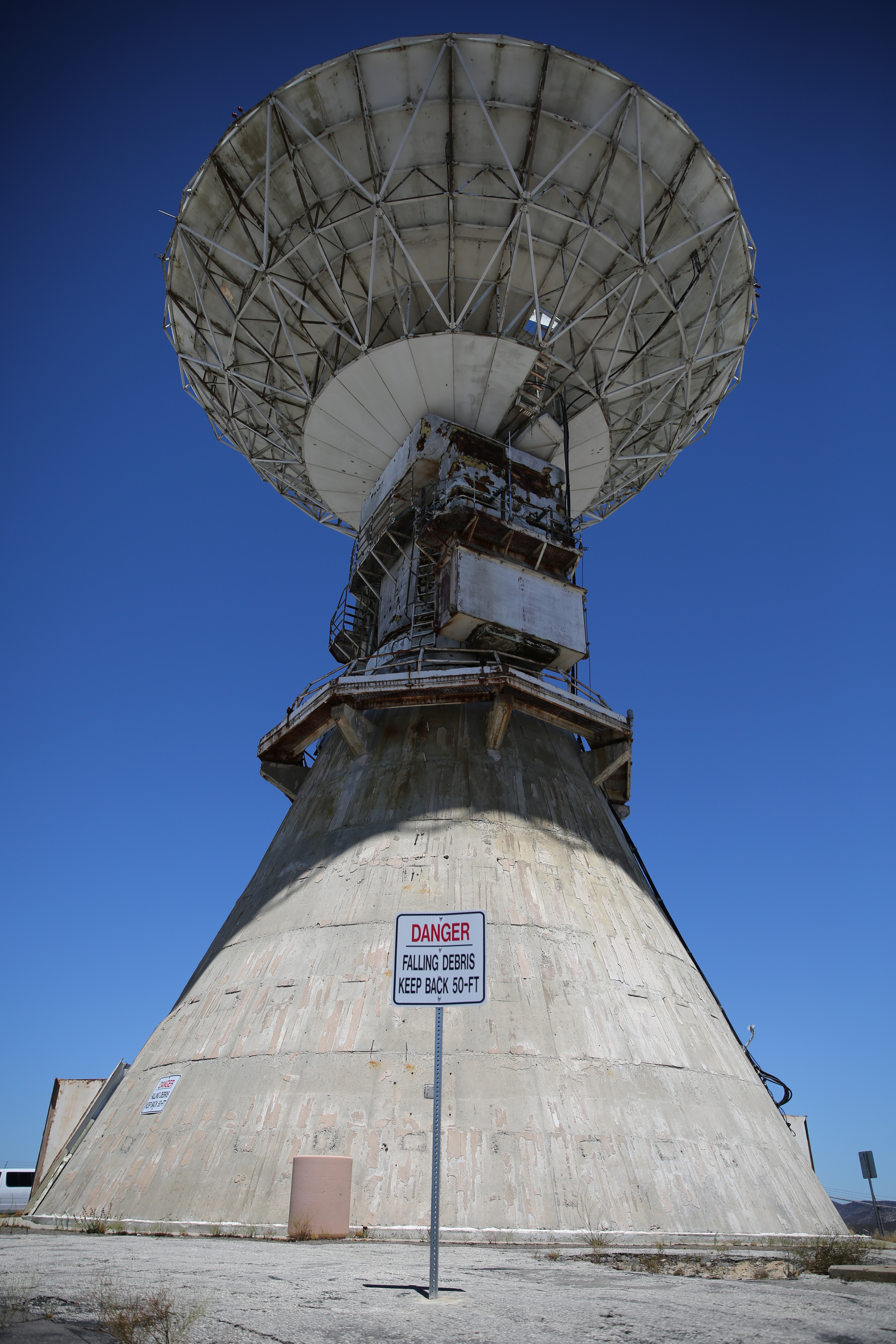
The view of the La Posta Astro-Geophysical Observatory in 2014.

The La Posta Astro-Geophysical Observatory was a 60-foot-diameter (18 m) Navy Electronics Laboratory radio-telescope installation at Campo, California, US.

Construction began in 1964 at a 3,900-foot-altitude (1,200 m) site in the Laguna Mountains, 65 miles (105 kilometers) east of San Diego. It was dismantled in late 2015.

== History ==
The observatory played a major role in solar radio mapping, studies of environmental disturbances, and development of a solar optical videometer for microwave research.

Its 60-foot dish, which could both transmit and receive, was used for important research programs in propagation and ionospheric forecasting which were used during a number of Apollo space launches to predict solar activity that might hamper communications from the ground to the space capsules. The building located at the lower right of the dish housed a turbine-powered alternator used to provide power for the dish operation. There was insufficient power available from the national grid. In addition, the dish was computer controlled by an operator located in the building below the dish. The dish movements were monitored by close-circuit television.

The observatory was decommissioned in 1986. The large dish physically remained unused until it was dismantled in late 2015; the surrounding site is now used as Mountain Warfare Training Camp Michael Monsoor, formerly La Posta Mountain Warfare Training Facility.

Local residents referred to the unused, upwards-pointing, dish as "the Pterodactyl Birdbath".

== See also ==
- List of observatories
