= Allan Rockwell McCann =

American admiral

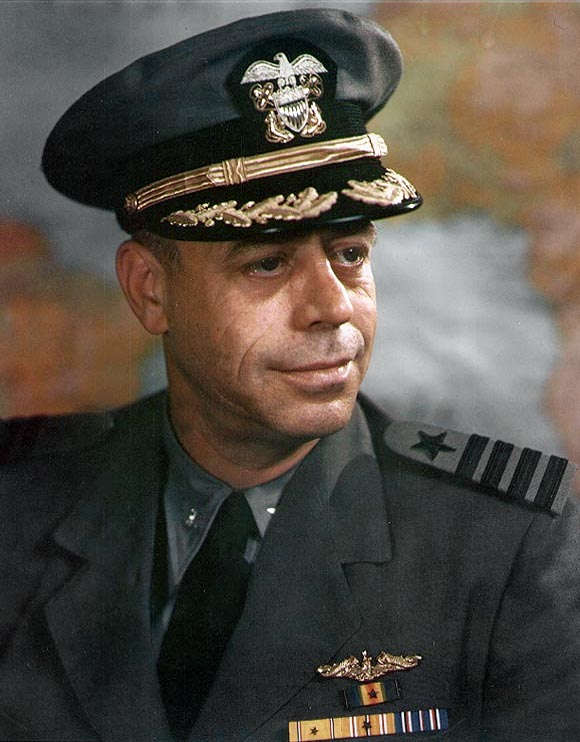
- Born: September 20, 1896; North Adams, Massachusetts, U.S.
- Died: February 22, 1978 (aged 81); San Diego, California, U.S.
- Burial place: Buried at sea
- Military career
- Allegiance: United States of America
- Branch: United States Navy
- Service years: 1917–1950
- Rank: Vice Admiral
- Commands: USS K-6; USS L-3; USS R-21; USS S-46; USS Bonita; Submarine Squadron 6, Pacific Fleet; Task Force 51; Submarine Squadron 7, Atlantic Fleet; USS Iowa; Task Force 68; Submarine Force, Pacific Fleet (COMSUBPAC)
- Conflicts: World War I World War II
- Awards: Legion of Merit (2); Bronze Star Medal; Navy Commendation Medal (2)

Vice Admiral Allan Rockwell McCann (September 20, 1896 – February 22, 1978) was a United States Navy officer who served in World War I and World War II. His US Navy Serial number was 10829.

== Education ==
Admiral McCann attended Mark Hopkins Grammar School and Drury High School in North Adams before his appointment to the United States Naval Academy from the First District of Massachusetts in 1913. He attended the US Naval Academy Preparation School before he was accepted as a midshipman. Graduated early and commissioned as an ensign in March 1917, because war was declared, he was assigned to USS Kansas (BB-21) on which he served throughout World War I.

== World War I to World War II ==
Until September 1919. Following instruction in submarines aboard USS Fulton (AS-1) at the Submarine Base, New London, Connecticut, he joined USS K-6 (SS-37) in January 1920, serving in command of that submarine from May to September of that year. Assigned duty in connection with fitting out USS S-19 (SS-124), he was detached in January 1921 before the commissioning of that submarine. He subsequently commanded the submarines USS N-4 (SS-56) and USS L-3 (SS-42) until June 1922. He transferred to USS R-21 (SS-98) at Coco Solo, Canal Zone, serving in command of that submarine until she was decommissioned in June 1924.

In July 1924, returning to the Submarine Base at New London, he served as an instructor in Diesel Engineering for one year, assigned to USS Chewink (AM-39). He then was transferred to duty as Chief Engineer and Repair Officer of that Base. In November 1925, he was assigned additional duty as technical adviser to the Peruvian Naval Commission at the Electric Boat Company, Groton, Connecticut, and when detached in October 1926, he commanded the submarine USS S-46 (SS-157), based on Coco Solo, Canal Zone, until May 1929.

He then served in the Design Division, later in the Maintenance Division, Bureau of Construction and Repair (now Bureau of Ships), Navy Department, Washington, D.C., for two years starting in July 1929. During that tour of duty, he was assigned to diving operations in connection with development of submarine escape apparatus and was in charge of the development of a submarine rescue chamber, which bears his name, "The McCann Submarine Rescue Chamber". As Commander of the United States Navy Experimental Diving Unit at the Washington Navy Yard he completed many other inventions for undersea use in submarines, diving, and communications. Additionally, he was assigned as Liaison Officer / Engineer when the submarine USS O-12 (SS-73) was converted for use in the under-ice attempt to circumnavigate the Arctic Icecap and voyage to the North Pole. Modifications to the submarine were extensive, and contained innovations of a telescoping conning tower, an ice drill, an incorporated diving bell and an Air Lock, designed by Simon Lake. The submarine was designated Nautilus and leased for one dollar to Lake and Danenhower, Inc., of Bridgeport, Connecticut, for use on Hubert Wilkins's and Lincoln Ellsworth's Arctic Expedition. He implemented 21 major changes to USS O-12 (SS-73) to facilitate passage under the arctic ice.

From August 1931 until June 1934, he commanded the submarine USS Bonita (SS-165), completing training for use of the Momsen Lung, and the McCann Submarine Rescue Chamber at Coco Solo. He had consecutive duty with the Board of Inspection and Survey, Pacific Coast Section, at San Francisco, California, and at Long Beach, California. He joined USS Oklahoma for 3 days, and then was transferred to USS Indianapolis (CA-35) in April 1936, and served as First Lieutenant and Damage Control Officer of that cruiser until June 1937. This vessel conveyed President Roosevelt to the Pan-American Conference. Transferred to duty as Damage Control Officer on the staff of Commander Cruisers, Scouting Force, USS Chicago (CA-29), he served in that assignment until June 1938.

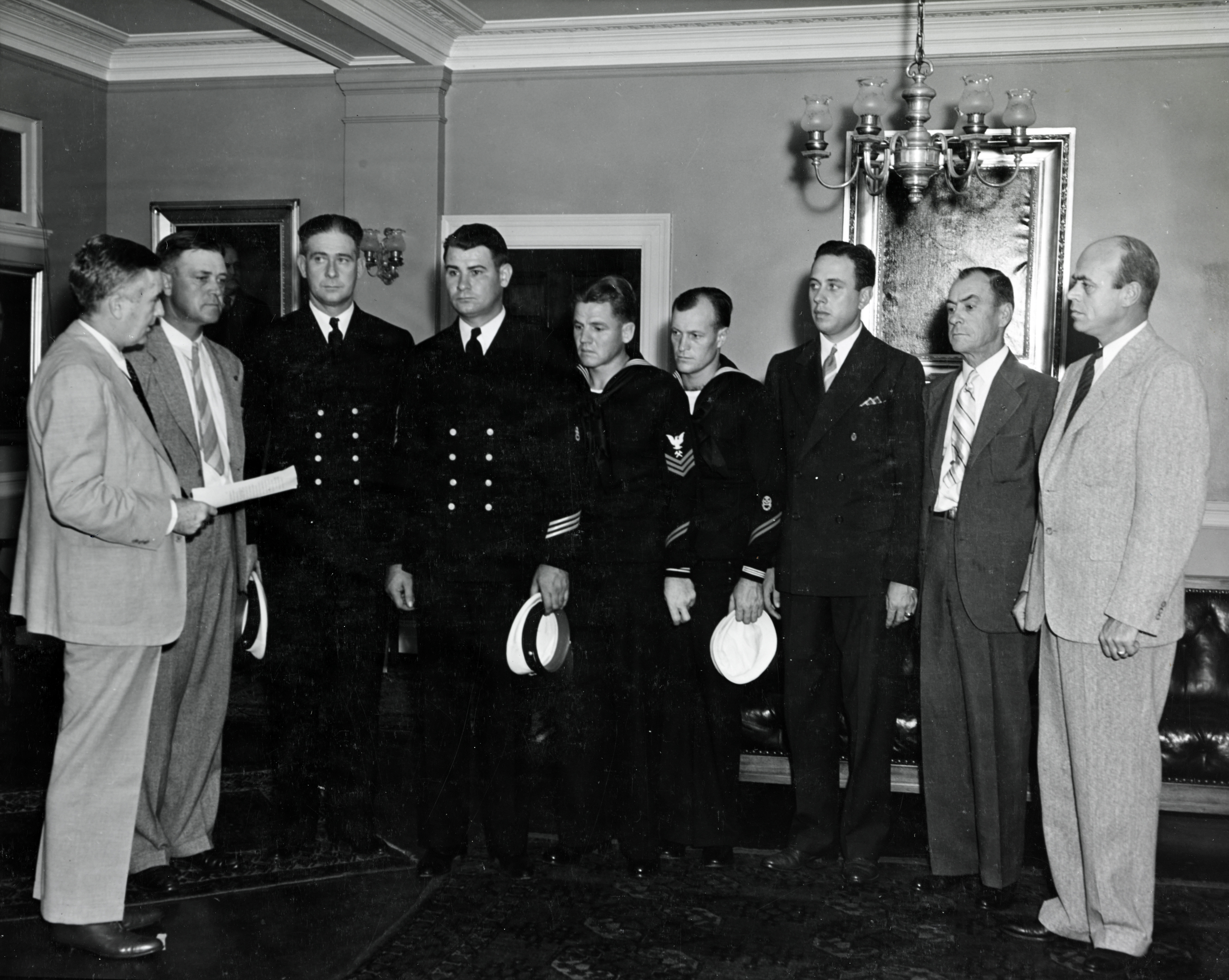
Acting Secretary of the Navy Charles Edison (left) reads a letter of commendation, presenting the Medal of Honor to four Divers under his command. from President Franklin D. Roosevelt to several members of the USS Squalus salvage unit in his Navy Department offices, September 16, 1939. Commander McCann is at right.

Returning to the Navy Department in July 1938, he reported for duty as Planning Officer, Personnel Division, Bureau of Navigation (now Bureau of Naval Personnel), and in May 1939 was ordered to duty in connection with the USS Squalus (SS-192) accident, sunk during a trial dive off Portsmouth, New Hampshire. As a member of the Squalus Salvage Unit, he played an important part in the rescue of 33 survivors and the salvage of the stricken submarine. He received a letter of commendation from the President of the United States, Franklin Delano Roosevelt for the success of this extremely difficult operation. It utilized the McCann Submarine Rescue Chamber he and Commander Charles B. 'Swede' Momsen had designed 10 years earlier.

== World War II and Post War ==
When detached from the Navy Department in April 1941, he assumed duty in May as Commander, Submarine Squadron 6, Pacific Fleet and was at the Battle of Pearl Harbor serving in that command when the United States entered World War II in December 1941. In January 1943 he was assigned additional duty in temporary command of Task Force 51 (Perth, Australia) and as Senior Representative of Commander Submarines Southwest Pacific. For his services in those assignments he was awarded the Legion of Merit.

In April 1943, he had orders transferring him to duty as Commander, Submarine Squadron 7, in the Atlantic, a command which utilized captured foreign submarines to train US Navy Sailors in Anti-submarine warfare techniques, and in September 1943 he returned to the United States. He was assigned for a tour of shore duty in the Fleet Maintenance Division, Office of the Chief of Naval Operations, Navy Department, and served until July 1944. He was given command of the battleship USS Iowa (BB-61) and from August 16, to November 28, 1944, was in the Western Pacific. The Bronze Star Medal was awarded to him for actions in the invasion of the Philippines.

In December 1944 he reported to Headquarters, Commander in Chief, US Fleet, Navy Department, and was assigned as his Assistant Chief of Staff (Anti-Submarine), and Chief of Staff to the Commander, Tenth Fleet, serving under immediate direction of Fleet Admiral Ernest J. King. The Tenth Fleet, a fleet without a ship, was a highly specialized intelligence command, able to call upon the surface and air forces of the Atlantic Fleet and the Sea Frontier Forces as needed for special assignments, and was organized to exercise unity of control over the Navy's war against U-boat operations in the Atlantic from Iceland to Cape Horn. The Tenth Fleet was dissolved in June 1945, and Rear Admiral McCann was transferred to duty on the staff of the Commander in Chief, Atlantic Fleet, and was subsequently designated Commander, Task Force 68, in the light cruiser USS Philadelphia (CL-41) during the Presidential trip to Berlin for the Potsdam Conference, July 4, to August 8, 1945. He personally reported to President Harry S. Truman the news of the successful atomic bombing of Hiroshima, Japan.

He was commended by President Harry S. Truman on August 7, 1945, for completing this most important mission, and for this duty he was awarded a Letter of Commendation with Ribbon by the Commander in Chief, Atlantic Fleet. He also was awarded a Gold Star in lieu of a second Legion of Merit.

He again served as Assistant Chief of Staff (Operations), on the staff of the Commander in Chief, US Fleet, from August 20, to October 10, 1945. In accordance with the reorganization of the Navy resulting from Executive Order 9635 of September 29, 1945, his title was changed to Head, Fleet Operations Section, Operations Division, under the Office of the Chief of Naval Operations, Navy Department. On December 18, 1945, he assumed duty as Commander, Submarine Force, Pacific Fleet, aboard light cruiser USS Fargo (CL-106) at the Submarine Base, Pearl Harbor, Territory of Hawaii.

As Commander Submarines Pacific, he was the commander of Operation Blue Nose, the first under-ice sonar testing missions off the Bering Strait, beginning July 30, 1947. Aboard the submarine USS Boarfish (SS-327), he made excursions with Dr. Waldo K. Lyon under the polar ice cap as far north as 72 degrees 15' north latitude.

On September 3, 1948, he reported as a Member of the General Board of the Navy Department, and on June 14, 1949, he transferred to duty as Inspector General, Navy Department, where he was tasked by President Harry S. Truman to investigate the Revolt of the Admirals. He was so serving when he was transferred to the Retired List of the Navy on May 1, 1950, and advanced in rank to Vice Admiral upon retirement, because of past combat citations.

== Death ==
Allan R. McCann died on February 22, 1978, at the US Navy Hospital at San Diego, California, and was buried at sea by the US Navy Submarine detachment, San Diego.

== Awards ==
Vice Admiral McCann's decorations included:

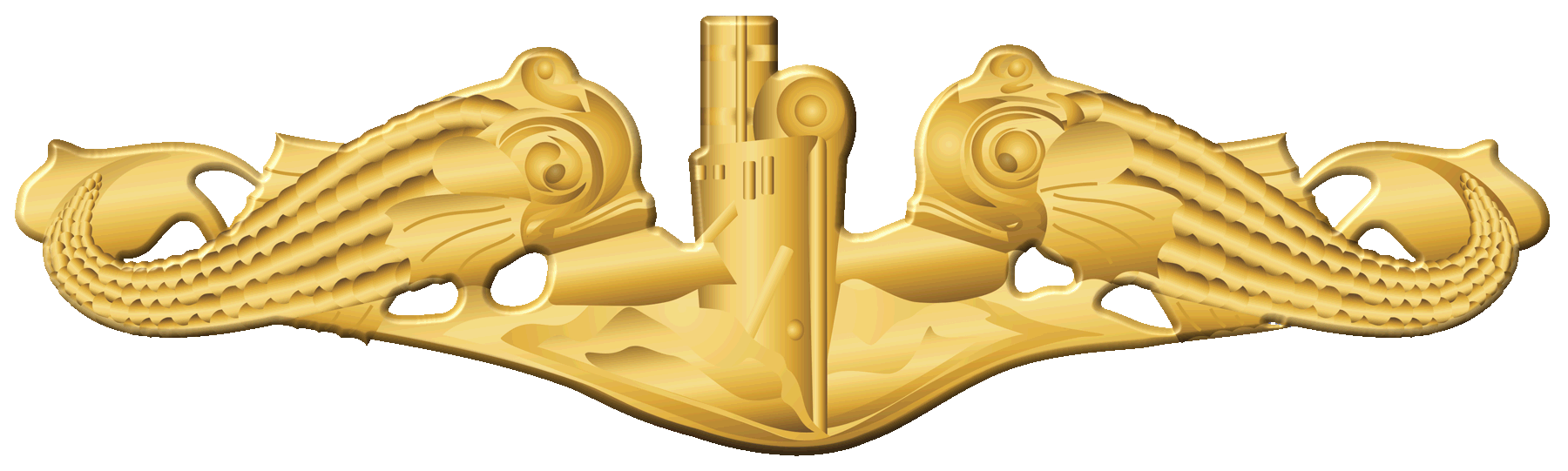

Submarine Warfare insignia
1st Row	Legion of Merit with Combat "V" and one 5/16" Gold Star		
2nd Row	Bronze Star Medal with Combat "V"	Navy Commendation Medal with one 5/16" Gold Star	World War I Victory Medal with Submarine Clasp
3rd Row	American Defense Service Medal with Fleet Clasp	American Campaign Medal	European–African–Middle Eastern Campaign Medal
4th Row	Asiatic-Pacific Campaign Medal with four 3/16 inch service stars	World War II Victory Medal	Philippine Liberation Medal with two stars

== See also ==
- LaVO, Carl, Pushing the Limits:The Remarkable Life and Times of Vice Admiral Allan Rockwell McCann, USN. Annapolis, Maryland: Naval Institute Press, 2013. ISBN 159114485X/978-1591144854
