= USS Rexburg =

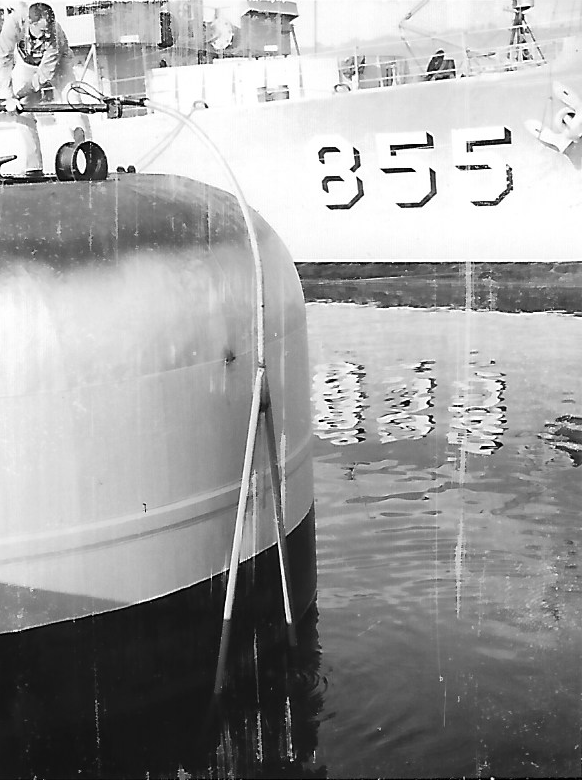
- USS Rexburg at the Navy Electronics Laboratory in the 1960s with the bow of USS Baya in the foreground

History

United States
- Name: PCE(R)-855
- Builder: Pullman-Standard Car Manufacturing Co., Chicago, Illinois
- Laid down: 8 December 1943
- Launched: 10 April 1944
- Commissioned: 1 November 1944
- Renamed: USS Rexburg (EPCER-855), February 1956
- Decommissioned: 2 March 1970
- Identification: IMO number: 7732963
- Fate: transferred to the Church of Scientology as MV Excaliber, 1970

General characteristics
- Class & type: PCE(R)-848-class patrol craft
- Displacement: 914 Tons (Full Load)
- Length: 184.5 ft (56.2 m)
- Beam: 33 ft (10 m)
- Draft: 9.75 ft (2.97 m)
- Propulsion: Main: 2 × GM 12-278A diesel engines; Auxiliary: 2 × GM 6-71 diesel engines with 100KW gen and 1 × GM 3-268A diesel engine with 60KW gen
- Speed: 16 knots (30 km/h; 18 mph) (maximum),
- Range: 6,600 nmi (12,200 km; 7,600 mi) at 11 knots (20 km/h; 13 mph)
- Complement: 85
- Armament: 1 × 3"/50 caliber gun (76 mm) Mk22 dual purpose gun; 3 × single Bofors 40 mm gun; 4 × 20 mm Oerlikon Mk10 guns; 4 × .50 cal (12.7 mm) machine guns

USS Rexburg (EPCE(R)-855) was built as a PCE(R)-848-class rescue escort patrol craft for the United States Navy during World War II. She was unnamed until 1956. After working through the 1950s and 60s as an oceanographic research vessel for the Navy Electronics Laboratory, Rexburg was decommissioned in 1970 and sold to the Church of Scientology as MV Excaliber.

== History ==
After completing shakedown training in the Gulf of Mexico in January 1945, the unnamed PCE(R)-855 transited the Panama Canal to join the Pacific Fleet. Although equipped with anti-submarine weapons for escort duty, she was used as a small hospital and tasked with rescue work during the battle of Okinawa, where she was credited with rescuing four-hundred sailors.

As helicopters proved more capable for rescue work after World War II, eight surviving rescue escort patrol craft were given other assignments. PCE(R)-855 was assigned to the Navy Electronics Laboratory at San Diego on 15 February 1946. On 7 June 1946 she was redesignated EPCER-855 and underwent alterations at Long Beach Naval Shipyard that enhanced her suitability for service as a laboratory research ship. Aft armament was replaced by a large cargo boom for towing instruments such as a thermistor chain to determine ocean temperature and salinity gradients from the surface to a depth of 800 ft (240 m).

She was given the name Rexburg in 1955 and in October 1959 came under the operational control of Operational Test and Evaluation Force, Pacific Projects Division, conducting electronic, communications, navigational, and underwater sound experiments until decommissioned on 2 March 1970. Before the ship was sold, the Navy removed the ship's bell for use at the Naval and Marine Corps Reserve Training Center in Denver.
