= USS Baya =

Submarine of the United States

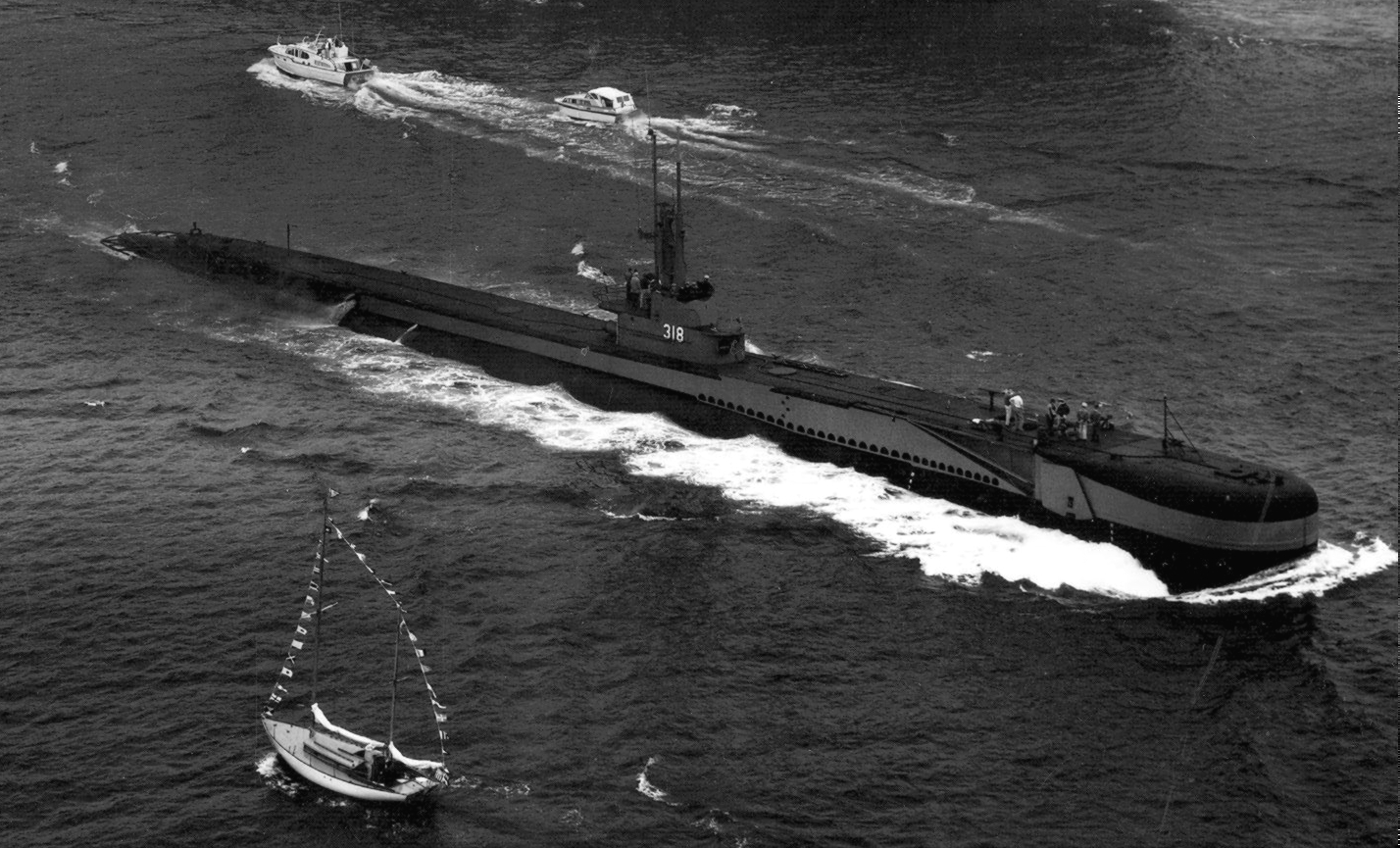
- USS Baya (AGSS-318), post-conversion in 1962.

History

United States
- Builder: Electric Boat Company, Groton, Connecticut
- Laid down: 8 April 1943
- Launched: 2 January 1944
- Commissioned: 20 May 1944
- Decommissioned: 14 May 1946
- Recommissioned: 10 February 1948
- Decommissioned: 30 October 1972
- Stricken: 30 October 1972
- Fate: Sold for scrap, 12 October 1973

General characteristics
- Class & type: Balao class diesel-electric submarine
- Displacement: 1,526 tons (1,550 t) surfaced; 2,424 tons (2,463 t) submerged
- Length: 311 ft 9 in (95.02 m)
- Beam: 27 ft 3 in (8.31 m)
- Draft: 16 ft 10 in (5.13 m) maximum
- Propulsion: 4 × General Motors Model 16-278A V16 diesel engines driving electrical generators; 2 × 126-cell Sargo batteries; 4 × high-speed General Electric electric motors with reduction gears; 2 × propellers; 5,400 shp (4.0 MW) surfaced; 2,740 shp (2.0 MW) submerged
- Speed: 20.25 knots (38 km/h) surfaced; 8.75 knots (16 km/h) submerged
- Range: 11,000 nautical miles (20,000 km) surfaced at 10 knots (19 km/h)
- Endurance: 48 hours at 2 knots (3.7 km/h) submerged; 75 days on patrol
- Test depth: 400 ft (120 m)
- Complement: 10 officers, 70–71 enlisted
- Armament: 10 × 21-inch (533 mm) torpedo tubes; 6 forward, 4 aft; 24 torpedoes; 1 × 5-inch (127 mm) / 25 caliber deck gun; Bofors 40 mm and Oerlikon 20 mm cannon

USS Baya (SS/AGSS-318), a Balao-class submarine, was a ship of the United States Navy named for the baya. During World War II, she completed five war patrols in the South China Sea, Gulf of Siam, Java Sea, and Philippine Sea between 23 August 1944 and 25 July 1945. She sank four Japanese vessels totaling 8855 gross register tons, and shared credit with the submarine USS Hawkbill (SS-366) for sinking a Japanese 8,407-gross register ton passenger-cargo ship. After World War II, she saw service as a research submarine during the Cold War and operated off Vietnam during the Vietnam War.

== Construction and commissioning ==
Baya was launched on 2 January 1944 by Electric Boat Company, Groton, Connecticut; sponsored by Mrs. Charles C. Kirkpatrick, and commissioned on 20 May 1944.

== Service history ==
=== World War II ===
Following a month of sea trials and training off the coast of New England, Baya departed New London, Connecticut, on 25 June 1944. As she proceeded via the Panama Canal to Hawaii, she continuously drilled and conducted exercises. She arrived at Pearl Harbor, Hawaii, in August 1944 and carried out a final round of training there.

==== First war patrol ====
Baya embarked on her first war patrol on 23 August 1944, departing Pearl Harbor in company with the submarines USS Becuna (SS-319) and USS Hawkbill (SS-366), with which she formed a coordinated attack group. After a brief stop at Saipan in the Mariana Islands for fuel, the three submarines proceeded to the Palau Islands, where they joined two other coordinated attack groups in intelligence-gathering missions in support of U.S. forces invading the islands. The reconnaissance group shifted position several times as it gathered information for Admiral William Halsey, Jr.'s United States Third Fleet, but for the submarines on patrol, it proved to be only a month of fighting heavy seas while not encountering any Japanese ships.

During the night of 25 September 1944, while patrolling in Luzon Strait, Baya submerged to avoid discovery by a Japanese airplane. She surfaced in rough seas about 30 minutes later. Her executive officer, engineering officer, and quartermaster were topside when a large wave crashed over Baya's stern, washing the three men overboard and flooding Baya through the conning tower hatch. Baya sank to a depth of 45 feet (14 m) before the hatch was secured. Her crew, fortunately at battle stations already, drained the conning tower, surfaced, and recovered the men washed overboard within half an hour. Repairs took a few hours at most, and Baya soon returned to her patrol.

While prowling the South China Sea on 7 October 1944, Baya encountered the only significant contact of the patrol when her radar detected three Japanese ships, an 8,407-gross register ton passenger-cargo ship, later identified as Kinugasa Maru, accompanied by two escorts, part of Japanese convoy HI-77. Baya and Hawkbill, each aware of the other's presence in the area but unaware that they are attacking the same ship, both joined in an attack on the merchant ship. Hawkbill′s first salvo of torpedoes missed, but Baya′s scored two hits. On her next try, Hawkbill also struck home with two torpedoes and, seconds later, Kinugasa Maru exploded and disappeared. On 9 October 1944, Baya departed the South China Sea and headed for Fremantle in Western Australia, where she arrived on 22 October 1944.

==== Second war patrol ====
After a short refit and training period, Baya got underway from Fremantle for her second war patrol, forming an attack group with the submarines USS Cavalla (SS-244) and USS Hoe (SS-258) in the South China Sea. In four separate incidents between 8 and 10 December 1944, Baya made contact with three Japanese destroyers and a Japanese hospital ship but failed to achieve a suitable attack position on any of the destroyers, and the hospital ship enjoyed immunity from attack. After that series of contacts, Baya took station in a scouting line deployed off Mindoro in the Philippine Islands between 14 and 25 December 1944. While shifting to the west on 27 December 1944, Baya sighted a Japanese task force consisting of two heavy cruisers and four destroyers attempting to retreat from the Philippines. She closed for an attack and fired a full spread of torpedoes at the leading heavy cruiser, but scored no hits. Soon thereafter, she received orders to proceed to Australia, and she arrived at Fremantle on 12 January 1945.

==== Third war patrol ====
After refit alongside the submarine tender USS Anthedon (AS-24), Baya put to sea once again on 19 February 1945 for her third war patrol, this time in company with the submarine USS Hammerhead (SS-364), and proceeded to a patrol area in the South China Sea off Cap Varella on the coast of Japanese-occupied French Indochina. The submarines sighted no significant targets until 4 March 1945, when the five-ship Japanese convoy HI-98, consisting of the tanker Palembang Maru, a cargo ship, and three escorts, appeared on Baya′s radar scope. Numerous sailboats hampered Baya as she attempted to approach the targets, and a calm, moonlit sea gave the advantage to her adversaries. However, two of the six torpedoes that she fired struck Palembang Maru, which exploded in a tremendous blaze. Two others hit the cargo ship, but Baya could not determine the extent of damage she caused because the escorts drove her deep with depth charges.

Baya emerged from the encounter unscathed and then shifted her attention to the Camranh Bay area off French Indochina. Two hours before the start of the midwatch on 20 March 1945, she contacted a single Japanese ship, the auxiliary netlayer Kainan Maru, leaving Phan Rang Bay. Just after midnight, she fired a three-torpedo salvo from her stern torpedo tubes and scored one hit that sank Kainan Maru. Later that morning, Baya fired another stern tube salvo at a convoy of two escort destroyers and a submarine chaser leaving Phan Rang Bay, but her luck did not hold. Her torpedoes missed and she had to dive to avoid the resulting depth charge counterattack that shook her up. Ordered to the newly liberated Subic Bay on Luzon in the Philippines, Baya arrived there on 27 March 1945 for repairs and a refit alongside the submarine tender USS Howard W. Gilmore (AS-16).

==== Fourth war patrol ====
Baya got underway with Cavalla on 20 April 1945 for her fourth war patrol, again assigned a patrol area off Camranh Bay, where, besides routine submerged patrolling, she and Cavalla were assigned lifeguard duties in support of air strikes against Saigon. On 29 April 1945, a United States Army Air Forces B-24 Liberator bomber which mistook her for a Japanese submarine dropped a bomb which exploded about 1,500 yards (1,370 m) ahead of Baya while Baya was operating approximately 15 nautical miles (28 km; 17 mi) east-northeast of Pulo Cecil de Mer, French Indochina, at 10°34′N 109°09′E. Baya suffered no damage or casualties.

On 2 May 1945, Baya joined the submarine USS Lagarto (SS-371) in the Gulf of Siam just north of Singapore. The next night, she began tracking a Japanese convoy made up of two gasoline tankers and two escorts. Baya maneuvered into position and fired her bow tubes, but the attack proved unsuccessful. The leading escort, a minelayer, gave chase, but Baya quickly eluded her pursuer. The following day, Baya rendezvoused with Lagarto to plan a coordinated attack on the convoy. The convoy's unusually alert escorts frustrated the efforts of the two submarines, and no opportunities for attack presented themselves that day. Early the next morning Lagarto tried to attack the convoy from a position 12 nautical miles (22 km; 14 mi) away from Baya. Afterward, Baya attempted to contact Lagarto but her calls went unanswered. Lagarto was never heard from agan, and Japanese records indicated that the minelayer Hatsutaka sank a submarine in that location at that time. Lagarto was lost with all hands.

Baya shifted her patrol to the Java Sea, where on 13 May 1945 off Rembang, Java, she attacked a three-ship convoy consisting of the tanker Yosei Maru, the tanker Enoshima Maru – which she misidentified as a cargo ship – and an escort bound for Palembang, Sumatra. She chose Yosei Maru as her first target and scored three hits with a spread of six torpedoes. She then aimed her stern tubes at the escort, and believed she scored two hits. To make a clean sweep, she fired her two remaining torpedoes at Enoshima Maru and retired, leaving Yosei Maru sinking and, her crew believed, the other two ships severely damaged. The guard boat No.17 Shonan Maru carried out an unsuccessful counterattack on Baya. Although Baya claimed to have sunk Enoshima Maru, the latter had, in fact, escaped unscathed. On 18 May 1945, Baya reached Fremantle for a refit alongside the submarine tender USS Clytie (AS-26).

==== Fifth war patrol ====
A fire in the maneuvering room delayed the start of Baya′s fifth war patrol, but after the completion of repairs, she got underway on 20 June 1945. At the beginning of the patrol, she operated south of Cape Selatan in support of Allied landings at Balikpapan, Borneo. On 27 June 1945, she intercepted a single Japanese minelayer but her torpedoes missed. On 29 and 30 June 1945, Baya and the submarine USS Capitaine (SS-336) conducted a coordinated gun attack on five Japanese small craft. Heavy return fire ended this engagement before Baya could add another sinking to her record.

Baya performed lifeguard duties in the Java Sea during the first half of July 1945 and then continued her patrol in that same area. On 16 July 1945, she torpedoed and sank the Japanese Ōtori-class torpedo boat Kari, then en route from Surabaya, Java, to Ambon with two torpedoes; two officers, 22 men, and one civilian passenger who survived Kari′s sinking ultimately reached Masalamo Besar on 18 July. After an unsuccessful gun attack on another Japanese patrol craft, Baya received orders to proceed to Subic Bay on 26 July 1945. She reached Subic Bay on 31 July 1945 and moored alongside Anthedon. She was at Subic Bay when hostilities with Japan ended on 15 August 1945.

==== End of war ====
Two weeks after Japan's capitulation, Baya departed Subic Bay bound for San Francisco, California, which she reached on 24 September 1945, passing under the Golden Gate Bridge as part of Admiral Halsey's symbolic end-of-war parade. Shortly thereafter she began inactivation, remaining in the San Francisco area, and on 14 May 1946 she was decommissioned and placed in reserve at Mare Island Navy Yard at Mare Island, California.

=== Research submarine ===
Baya was converted to an electronics experimental submarine and recommissioned on 10 February 1948. All torpedo loading and stowage equipment was removed at the Mare Island Naval Shipyard to make room for Naval Electronics Laboratory (NEL) personnel and equipment. Reclassified as an auxiliary research submarine, AGSS-318, on 12 August 1949, Baya conducted experiments for NEL San Diego, California. She participated in local operations near San Diego and served with a joint American-Canadian task force gathering scientific data off western Canada in November and December 1948. During July–September 1949 she made a cruise to the Arctic to gather valuable scientific data in the Bering Sea and Chukchi Sea.

In April 1953, Baya began an overhaul at the Pearl Harbor Naval Shipyard at Pearl Harbor, Hawaii, and, upon completing it, resumed her duties in support of underwater electronics research, which occupied her throughout 1954 and for most of 1955. Between July and October 1955 she was deployed to Pearl Harbor for further experimental research. In December 1955 she commenced an overhaul at the Hunters Point Naval Shipyard in San Francisco to update her capabilities for NEL testing.

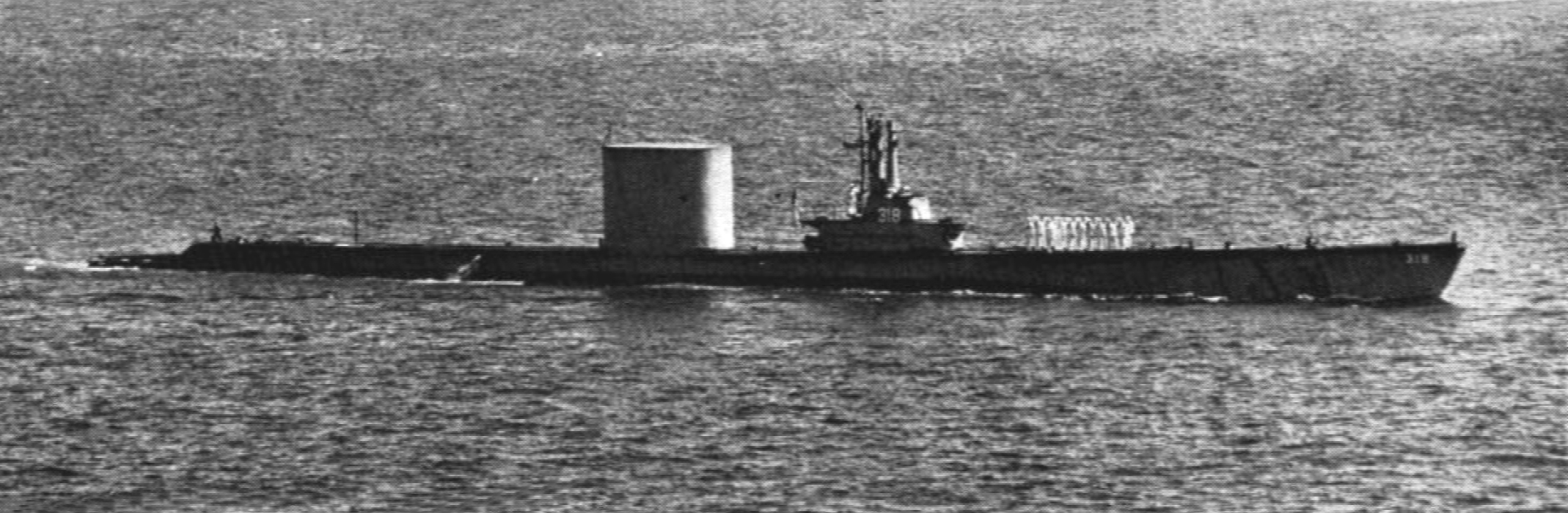
Baya in 1957, after her first rebuild, with large fairwater abaft her conning tower.

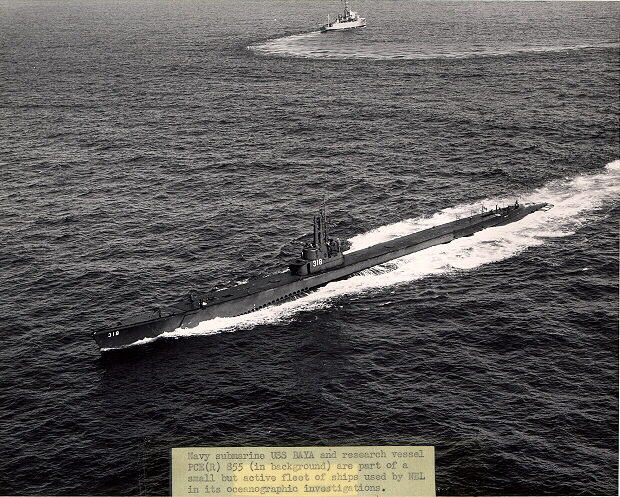
USS Baya shown during her Naval Electronics Laboratory (NEL) duties. The vessel in the upper part of the photo is the NEL oceanographic research ship USS Rexburg.

Baya was used as a testbed for two early sonar transducer arrays which markedly changed her appearance. The first arrangement of 196 transducers in a 14×14 array was attached to the former gun mount abaft the conning tower, facing starboard and surrounded by a fairwater resembling a second conning tower. She then operated from San Diego and Pearl Harbor for the rest of her career. She conducted a one-day cruise to film an episode of the 1958–1961 television show Sea Hunt, starring Lloyd Bridges.

After the first array and fairwater were removed, Baya was completely reworked at Mare Island Naval Shipyard during 1958 and 1959 to test a second array, called LORAD (for "LOng RAnge Detection"). The forward torpedo tubes were removed and replaced by a blunt bow containing the forward-facing transducer array. A mushroom anchor was installed in the bottom of the hull; and a 23-foot (7.0 m) section was added between the former forward torpedo room and the forward battery compartment, with quarters for twelve scientists. These modifications increased her overall length to 330 feet (101 m), and her submerged displacement to approximately 2,600 tons. Her maximum speed was reduced to 10.5 knots (19 km/h).

Baya served in the Vietnam War zone for two months in 1966 in conjunction with sonar research operations for NEL and in submerged visibility studies for the Naval Oceanographic Office. In 1968, she commenced a series of tests for the Operational Test and Evaluation Force, Pacific, and the Naval Undersea Warfare Center. In 1971, she performed research in the Gulf of Alaska before returning to San Diego in December 1971. In April 1972, she made one last cruise to Pearl Harbor to conduct sonar experiments before returning to San Diego.

== Decommissioning and disposal ==
Baya was decommissioned and struck from the Naval Register on 30 October 1972. She was sold on 12 October 1973 for scrapping.

== Honors and awards ==
- Asiatic–Pacific Campaign Medal with four battle stars for World War II service
- World War II Victory Medal
- Vietnam Service Medal with two battle stars for Vietnam War service
