= USS Boarfish =

Submarine of the United States

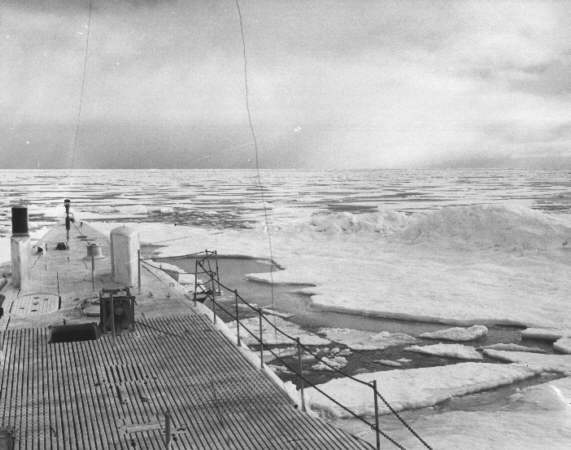
- View from the bow of Boarfish (SS-327) in the Chukchi Sea in 1947

History

United States
- Name: USS Boarfish (SS-327)
- Builder: Electric Boat Company, Groton, Connecticut
- Laid down: 12 August 1943
- Launched: 21 May 1944
- Commissioned: 23 September 1944
- Decommissioned: 23 May 1948
- Stricken: 28 May 1948
- Fate: Transferred to Turkey, 23 May 1948
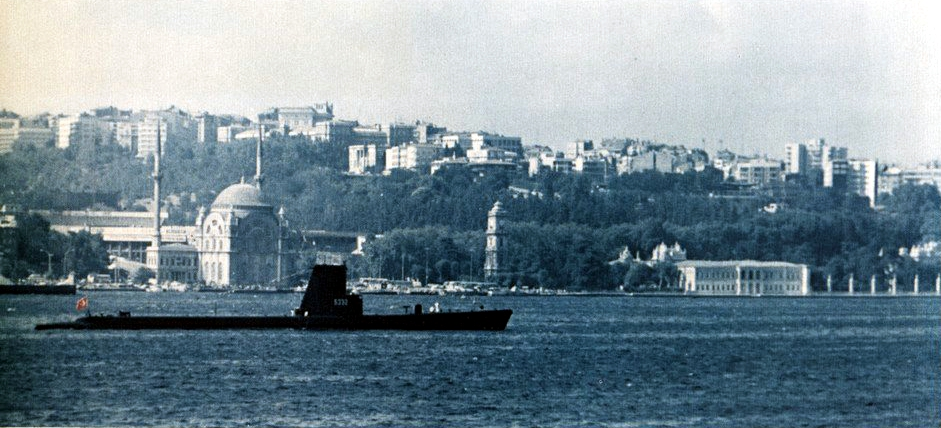
- TCG Sakarya (S-332) off Istanbul in 1973.

Turkey
- Name: TCG Sakarya (S-332)
- Acquired: 23 August 1948
- Out of service: 1972
- Fate: Returned to US custody for scrapping, 1 January 1974

General characteristics
- Class & type: Balao class diesel-electric submarine
- Displacement: 1,526 long tons (1,550 t) surfaced; 2,424 long tons (2,463 t) submerged
- Length: 311 ft 9 in (95.02 m)
- Beam: 27 ft 3 in (8.31 m)
- Draft: 16 ft 10 in (5.13 m) maximum
- Propulsion: 4 × General Motors Model 16-278A V16 diesel engines driving electrical generators; 2 × 126-cell Sargo batteries; 4 × high-speed General Electric electric motors with reduction gears; 2 × propellers; 5,400 shp (4.0 MW) surfaced; 2,740 shp (2.0 MW) submerged
- Speed: 20.25 knots (38 km/h) surfaced; 8.75 knots (16 km/h) submerged
- Range: 11,000 nautical miles (20,000 km) surfaced at 10 knots (19 km/h)
- Endurance: 48 hours at 2 knots (3.7 km/h) submerged; 75 days on patrol
- Test depth: 400 ft (120 m)
- Complement: 10 officers, 70–71 enlisted
- Armament: 10 × 21-inch (533 mm) torpedo tubes; 6 forward, 4 aft; 24 torpedoes; 1 × 5-inch (127 mm) / 25 caliber deck gun; Bofors 40 mm and Oerlikon 20 mm cannon

USS Boarfish (SS-327), a Balao-class submarine, was a ship of the United States Navy named for the boarfish, a fish having a projecting hog-like snout.

== Construction and commissioning ==
Boarfish (SS-327) was laid down on 12 August 1943; launched on 21 May 1944 by Electric Boat Company, Groton, Connecticut, sponsored by Miss Barbara Walsh, daughter of Senator Arthur Walsh of New Jersey; and commissioned on 23 September 1944, Commander Royce L. Gross in command.

== World War II ==
Following shakedown training off the coast of New England, the submarine departed New London, Conn. on 29 October 1944 for Panama. After a week of intensive training in Panamanian waters, Boarfish transited the Panama Canal on 21 November and set out for Pearl Harbor where she arrived on 2 December. Another three weeks of training in Hawaii followed, and then Boarfish stood out of Pearl Harbor on 24 December bound for the western Pacific. She refueled and took on provisions at Saipan before embarking upon her first war patrol on 5 January 1945.

Boarfish sailed to the South China Sea to patrol the coast of French Indochina. Early on 21 January, the submarine's radar picked up a small convoy of five or six small ships. Boarfish closed the convoy three times in three hours, firing 16 torpedoes, all of which apparently passed under the targets. She broke off the attack at daybreak and did not regain contact. On 31 January, the boat made another radar contact on two cargo ships under escort. During Boarfish's initial approach, an escort sighted the submarine and chased her away. The boat then fired her torpedoes at periscope depth and scored hits on both ships. When Boarfish submerged to avoid the escorts, she left Enki Maru (6,968 tons) sinking and Taietsu Maru (6,890 tons) burning fiercely and beached nearby. Even while avoiding depth charges, Boarfish tried to close the beach to finish the job. She abandoned the attempt after 36 hours because fire had so ravaged the cargo ship that she seemed unsalvageable. Taietsu Maru was destroyed completely by American planes of the 14th Air Force later that same day, and Boarfish received partial credit for the sinking. The submarine ended her first patrol on 15 February when she pulled into Fremantle, Australia, for refit alongside submarine tender Euryale (AS-22).

The submarine's second patrol began on 11 March 1945 when she departed Fremantle for a second tour of duty in the South China Sea. Although she encountered and attacked two small convoys, their alert escorts foiled both attacks. Boarfish successfully carried out two reconnaissance missions along the east coast of French Indochina before ending her patrol in Subic Bay on 21 April.

After refit alongside Anthedon (AS-24), Boarfish left Subic Bay on 16 May for the Java Sea. Her first action came when she sighted a small two-masted junk on 27 May. A boarding party searched the junk for arms, contraband, and Japanese, but found nothing, and the junk was allowed to proceed. Two days later, a small convoy of three ships accompanied by two escorts crossed Boarfish's path. She launched four torpedoes at the lead ship before losing firing position. Her crew heard an explosion; but, when the officer at the conn peered through her periscope, he saw a charging escort instead of a sinking ship. The submarine dived, intending to put 215 feet (66 m) of the 240 feet (73 m) charted at that location between her and the escort. At 216 feet (66 m), the submarine grounded, knocking off her sound gear and making enough noise to betray her position easily. Eight depth charges followed as Boarfish tried to free herself. Despite damage to her port propeller, the submarine backed off the seamount and eased up to 180 feet (55 m) to escape. The damage sustained in the grounding was severe enough to force an early return to Fremantle, where she arrived on 8 June.

After repair and refit alongside Clytie (AS-26), she departed on 5 July for her fourth war patrol. Operating in a coordinated attack group Boarfish, Blenny (SS-324), and Chub (SS-329) covered the Java Sea off Java and the north coast of Bali. They made no surface contacts but encountered a number of enemy planes, one of which depth-bombed Boarfish on 8 July. On the 29th, Boarfish performed lifeguard duties during an Allied air strike on Singapore, and she remained off the Malay coast patrolling until 6 August, when she set course for Subic Bay. The submarine pulled alongside Howard W. Gilmore (AS-16) for refit on 10 August and was there when the Japanese capitulation was announced.

== 1945–1948 ==
Boarfish sailed from Subic Bay on 30 August in company with Howard W. Gilmore and 17 submarines. She parted company with them on 5 September and put into Apra Harbor, Guam, where she remained until 17 November training in postwar maneuvers and drills. She got underway on 17 November and set course via Pearl Harbor for San Diego, Calif. where she arrived early in February 1946.

Boarfish operated out of San Diego in local training exercises until 9 September, when she got underway for a tour in the western Pacific. After a brief stopover in Pearl Harbor, the submarine got underway on 1 October for a tour that included visits to Midway Island; Marcus Island; Okinawa; Qingdao, China; and Guam. She began her return cruise to San Diego on 11 November and, upon her arrival, resumed local operations.

Boarfish remained in the San Diego area until 15 November 1947 except for one cruise to Pearl Harbor in February 1947 and another to Alaska and Canada between July and November. Commencing 30 July 1947 Boarfish was the flagship of the first exploration under the Polar Ice Cap in the Bering Strait, this mission designated as Task Group 17.3 Operation Blue Nose under the command of R. Adm. Allan Rockwell McCann for the purpose of testing the under-ice use of Sonar, developed by Dr. Waldo K. Lyon, director of the Arctic Submarine Laboratory, who was also aboard. On 15 November, the submarine entered the Mare Island Naval Shipyard for overhaul before transfer to the Turkish Navy. She left Mare Island on 21 February 1948 and steamed via San Diego, Panama, New London, Malta, and Port Argostoli, Greece, to İzmir, Turkey.

Boarfish was struck from the Naval Register on 20 May 1948, and transferred (sold) to Turkey under terms of the Security Assistance Program, 23 August 1948. She was returned to US custody for scrapping, 1 January 1974.

Boarfish received one battle star for her service in World War II.

== TCG Sakarya (S 332) ==
On 23 May 1948, Boarfish was decommissioned and immediately recommissioned in the Turkish Navy as TCG Sakarya (S 332), the second submarine named in honor of the 1921 Battle of Sakarya.
