= Theodore F. Brophy =

American businessman and telecommunications professional (1923–2020)

- Born: August 23, 1923; New York City, New York, U.S.
- Died: August 3, 2020 (aged 96); Florida, U.S.
- Education: Yale University (BA); Harvard University (JD)
- Organization: GTE

Theodore F. Brophy (August 23, 1923 – August 3, 2020) was an American businessman, attorney, and telecommunications executive. He joined GTE in 1958, became the president in 1972, and the chairman and chief executive officer in 1976.

== Early life and education ==
Brophy was born on August 23, 1923, in New York City, New York. He graduated from Kent School in 1941, Yale University in 1944, and Harvard Law School in 1949.

== Career ==
Brophy served in the United States Navy from 1944 to 1946 and was on the submarine USS Cabezon in the South Pacific during World War II. While in the Navy, he rose to the rank of lieutenant (junior grade). He worked for the law firm Dewey Ballantine from 1949 to 1955. He was general counsel for the Lummus Company from 1955 to 1958.

While chairman and chief executive officer of GTE, Brophy strongly opposed trade protectionism and he took steps to reduce threat of a corporate raid or "greenmailing".

In August 1988, President Ronald Reagan appointed him as an ambassador while serving as the chairman of a United States delegation for radio and satellite space communications during an international conference. In October 1985, President Reagan also appointed him chairman of the President's National Security Telecommunications Advisory Committee for a period of one year. He served on the committee 1986–88.

Throughout his career, he held various board and trustee positions.

== Personal life ==
Brophy died on August 3, 2020, in Florida.
