= Navy Electronics Laboratory =

United States Navy organization

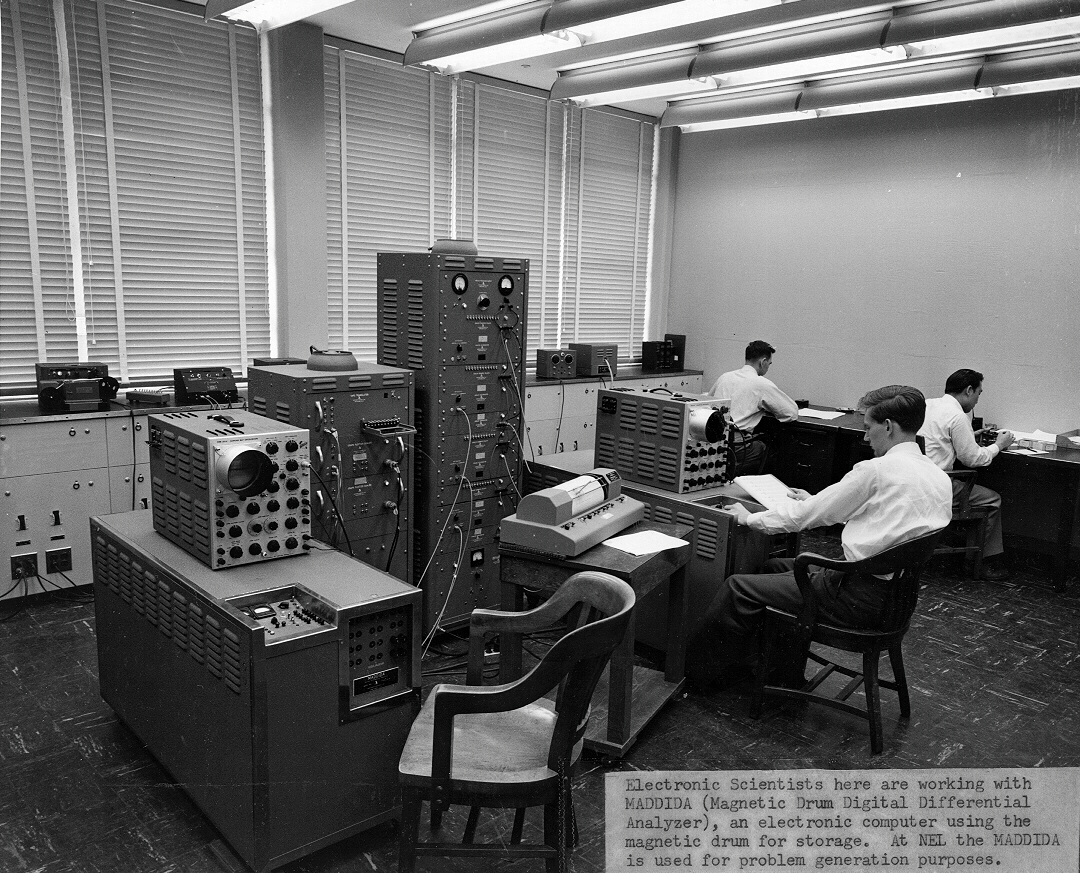
- Established: 1945 (81 years ago)
- Dissolved: Merged into Naval Ocean Systems Center (1977)
- Types: laboratory
- Country: United States

The U.S. Navy Electronics Laboratory (NEL) was created in 1945, with consolidation of the naval radio station, radar operators training school, and radio security activity of the Navy Radio and Sound Lab (NRSL) and its wartime partner, the University of California Division of War Research. NEL's charter was “to effectuate the solution of any problem in the field of electronics, in connection with the design, procurement, testing, installation and maintenance of electronic equipment for the U.S. Navy”. Its radio communications and sonar work was augmented with basic research in the propagation of electromagnetic energy in the atmosphere and of sound in the ocean.

== History ==
In November 1945, the Navy Radio and Sound Lab was renamed as Navy Electronics Laboratory. 80% of the Point Loma Military Reservation evolved into the Naval Electronics Laboratory Center (NELC) at the end of World War II. In turn NELC was merged into the Naval Ocean Systems Center (NOSC) in 1977. This eventually was merged into the Space and Naval Warfare Systems Command (SPAWAR) in 1997.

In the 1960s, NELC was tasked with 4C: Command, Control, Communications and Computers.

== Projects ==
=== Shipboard Antenna Model Range ===
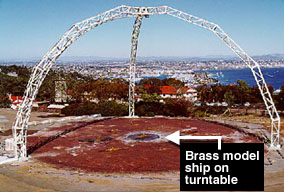
Shipboard Antenna Model Range photograph showing location of model ship.

As one of its first projects, NEL began building its Shipboard Antenna Model Range. The non-metallic arch of this structure supports a transmitting antenna which is positioned toward a brass model ship on a turntable. The ground plane under the arch simulates the electrical characteristics of the ocean, allowing research on the properties of shipboard antennas to be carried out.

=== Arctic submarine exploration ===
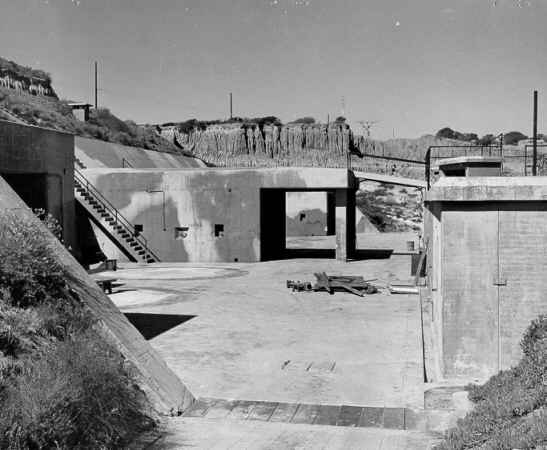
Battery Whistler facility, c. 1948.

It also began conversion of a World War II mortar emplacement, Battery Whistler, into an Arctic Submarine Laboratory. Scientific exploration of the Arctic Basin, and particularly providing the capability to operate attack submarines in the Arctic under the ice canopy, would become a key NEL mission.

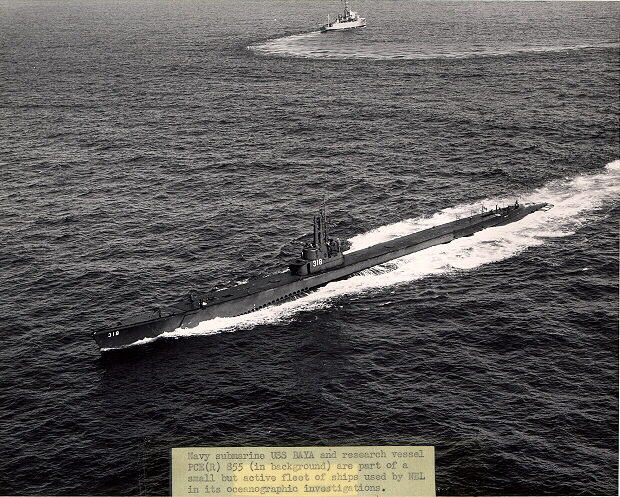
USS Baya and research vessel USS Rexburg were part of a small but active fleet of ships used by NEL.

World headlines came early in this program from several events—the submerged voyage of USS Nautilus from the Pacific to the Atlantic, via the North Pole, in 1958, with NEL's Dr. Waldo Lyon aboard as chief scientist and ice pilot. That same summer, the USS Skate cruised from the Atlantic to the North Pole and the central Arctic Ocean, surfacing 9 times through small holes in the ice cap. Dr. Eugene C. La Fond, head of NEL's Oceanography Branch, was chief scientist In March 1959, the Skate returned to the Arctic, under winter conditions, with Dr. Waldo Lyon as chief scientist, and for the first time, the nuclear submarine was able to surface exactly at the North Pole.

=== Bathyscaphe Trieste ===
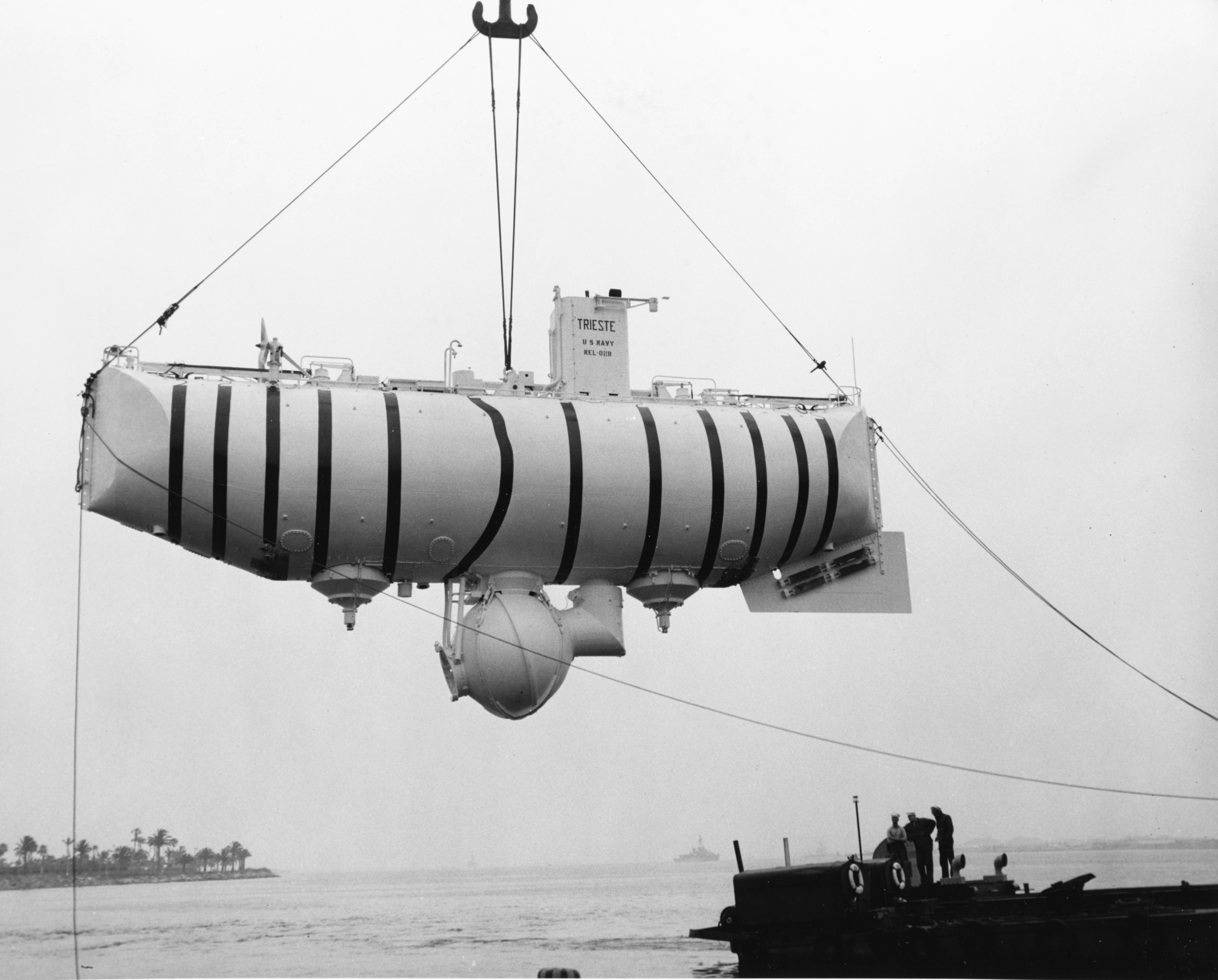
The Bathyscaphe Trieste.

NEL also plunged into the undersea environment, acquiring the Bathyscaphe Trieste and directing its 1960 dive over 35,000 feet (10.7 km) down into the Challenger Deep of the Mariana Trench near Guam.

=== Radio telescopes ===
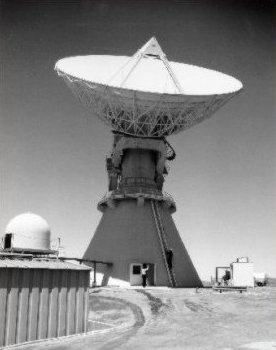
La Posta Astro-Geophysical Observatory

Interested in radio physics in general, the lab built a 60-foot (18 m)-diameter radio telescope on Point Loma, and in 1964, NEL began construction of the La Posta Astro-Geophysical Observatory on a 3,900-foot (1,200 m) site in the Laguna Mountains, 65 miles (105 km) east of San Diego. The observatory played a major role in solar radio mapping, studies of environmental disturbances, and development of a solar optical videometer for microwave research. Its 60-foot (18 m) dish, which could both transmit and receive, was used for important Center research programs in propagation and ionospheric forecasting which was used during a number of Apollo space launches to predict solar activity that might hamper communications from the ground to the space capsules.

=== Communications ===
In the area of communications, NEL developed Verdin, a low-frequency/very-low-frequency (LF/VLF) system to provide information to deeply submerged Polaris missile submarines, and began development of satellite communication capabilities.

Requirements for handling the vast amount of shipboard communications during the intensifying Vietnam War led to tasking for an internal message handling system. In response, the lab developed the Message Processing and Distribution System (MPDS), installing it aboard the Seventh Fleet flagship USS Oklahoma City a month ahead of schedule. The lab improved substantially on that system later and installed it aboard Nimitz-class aircraft carriers.

=== Computer science ===
The programming language dialect NELIAC was developed by and named after the lab.

NELIAC was the brainchild of Harry Huskey, at the time Chairman of the Association for Computing Machinery, who had suggested porting applications in a machine-independent form. ALGOL 58 gave NEL the framework for an implementation, and work commenced in 1958, but was not fully developed until 1961.

NELIAC was used at NEL to support experimental anti-submarine systems and Command and Control Systems development, and later, at the Navy Command Systems and Support Activity (NAVCOSSACT) in Washington DC in support of the National Emergency Command Post Afloat (NECPA) project which was installed on many large ships starting in 1966.

This was the world's first self-compiling compiler and was ported to many other computers in the Department of Defense, it also included the NELOS operating system development used for large scale applications (unique to the AN/USQ-20 Navy shipboard computer and its commercial version, the UNIVAC 490).

Many other versions existed for a variety of computers because the ease of portability and the rapid one-pass compile times.

== Naval Command, Control and Communications Laboratory Center and beyond ==
In 1967, as part of the general Navy laboratory re-organization, NEL became the Naval Command, Control and Communications Laboratory Center. The name was never fully accepted, and in about six months it was changed to Naval Electronics Laboratory Center (NELC).

In 1971, the Antisubmarine Forces Command and Control System (AFCCS) and Naval Ocean Surveillance System (NOSS) were software projects under development at NELC using an IBM 360/65 computer. AFCCS (later ASWCCCS) was re-written in 1972 for the Honeywell 6050 computer after DoD contracted with Honeywell to supply computers for the Worldwide Military Command and Control System (WWMCCS). On March 1, 1977, NELC and NUC were consolidated to form the Naval Ocean Systems Center (NOSC) (today the Space and Naval Warfare Systems Center Pacific).
