= USS Caiman =

Submarine of the United States

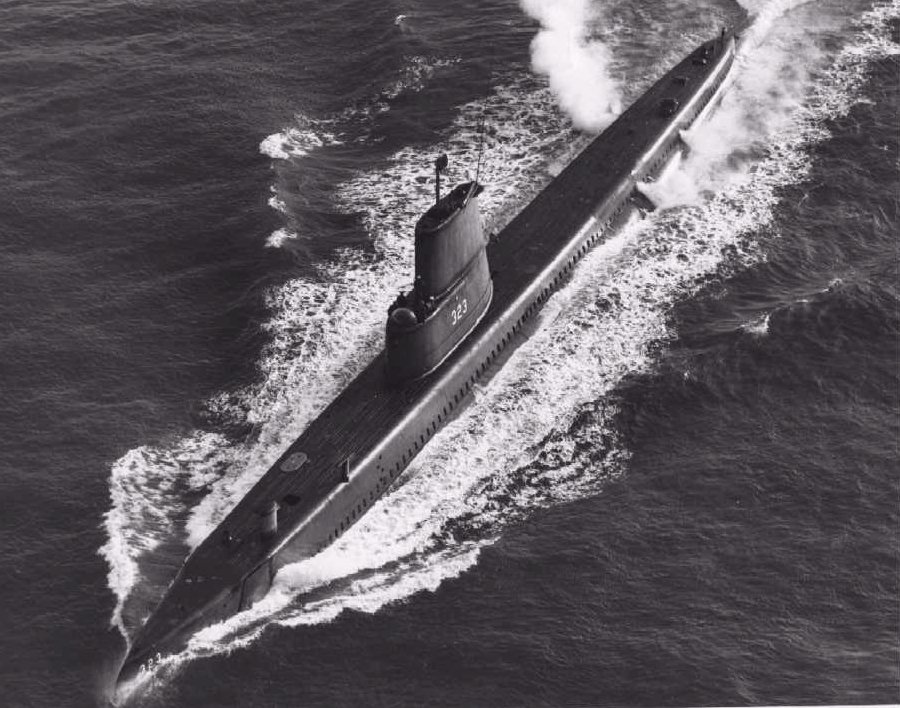
- Caiman (SS-323), spring 1951, following GUPPY upgrade.

History

United States
- Name: USS Caiman (SS-323)
- Namesake: The caiman, a salt-water latiloid fish of Florida and the West Indies, and caiman, a genus of crocodilians of Central America and South America
- Builder: Electric Boat Company, Groton, Connecticut
- Laid down: 24 June 1943
- Launched: 30 March 1944
- Commissioned: 17 July 1944
- Decommissioned: 30 June 1972
- Stricken: 30 June 1972
- Fate: Transferred to Turkey, 30 June 1972

Turkey
- Name: TCG Dumlupınar (S 339)
- Commissioned: 24 August 1972
- Decommissioned: 15 September 1986
- Renamed: Ceryan Botu (Y-1247) 6 February 1983
- Reclassified: Charging boat 6 February 1983
- Fate: Retired 15 September 1986

General characteristics (As completed)
- Class & type: Balao-class diesel-electric submarine
- Displacement: 1,526 long tons (1,550 t) surfaced; 2,424 tons (2,463 t) submerged
- Length: 311 ft 9 in (95.02 m)
- Beam: 27 ft 3 in (8.31 m)
- Draft: 16 ft 10 in (5.13 m) maximum
- Propulsion: 4 × General Motors Model 16-278A V16 diesel engines driving electrical generators; 2 × 126-cell Sargo batteries; 4 × high-speed General Electric electric motors with reduction gears; 2 × propellers; 5,400 shp (4.0 MW) surfaced; 2,740 shp (2.0 MW) submerged
- Speed: 20.25 knots (38 km/h) surfaced; 8.75 knots (16 km/h) submerged
- Range: 11,000 nautical miles (20,000 km) surfaced at 10 knots (19 km/h)
- Endurance: 48 hours at 2 knots (3.7 km/h) submerged; 75 days on patrol
- Test depth: 400 ft (120 m)
- Complement: 10 officers, 70–71 enlisted
- Armament: 10 × 21-inch (533 mm) torpedo tubes; 6 forward, 4 aft; 24 torpedoes; 1 × 5-inch (127 mm) / 25 caliber deck gun; Bofors 40 mm and Oerlikon 20 mm cannon

General characteristics (Guppy IA)
- Class & type: none
- Displacement: 1,830 tons (1,859 t) surfaced; 2,440 tons (2,479 t) submerged
- Length: 307 ft 7 in (93.75 m)
- Beam: 27 ft 4 in (8.33 m)
- Draft: 17 ft (5.2 m)
- Propulsion: Snorkel added; Batteries upgraded to Sargo II
- Speed: Surfaced: 17.3 knots (32.0 km/h) maximum; 12.5 knots (23.2 km/h) cruising; Submerged: 15.0 knots (27.8 km/h) for ½ hour; 7.5 knots (13.9 km/h) snorkeling; 3.0 knots (5.6 km/h) cruising
- Range: 17,000 nmi (31,000 km) surfaced at 11 knots (20 km/h)
- Endurance: 36 hours at 3 knots (6 km/h) submerged
- Complement: 10 officers; 5 petty officers; 64–69 enlisted men
- Armament: 10 × 21 inch (533 mm) torpedo tubes; (six forward, four aft); all guns removed

USS Caiman (SS-323), a Balao-class submarine, was a ship of the United States Navy that was later transferred to the Turkish Naval Forces in 1972 under the Security Assistance Program, where she was recommissioned as the third TCG Dumlupınar. She was retired in 1986.

== Career (US) ==
Originally Blanquillo, the vessel was renamed on 24 September 1942 after the caiman, a fresh water alligator inhabiting the Amazon River, and launched on 30 March 1944 by Electric Boat Co., Groton, Connecticut; sponsored by Mrs. R. C. Bonjour; commissioned 17 July 1944. She reported to the Pacific Fleet.

During World War II, Caiman sailed from Pearl Harbor on her first war patrol 13 November 1944. Pausing at Saipan to put ashore her severely ill commanding officer and embark his relief, the submarine pushed on to the South China Sea, where she combined offensive patrol with lifeguard duty as a part of air-sea rescue operations to save aviators downed in air strikes on enemy-held territory. Aggressive American submarine and naval air attack had already greatly reduced the Japanese merchant fleet; hence Caiman made no contacts on this patrol, from which she returned to Fremantle, Australia, on 22 January 1945 to refit.

Her second patrol, performed in the South China Sea and off the Gulf of Siam, from 18 February to 6 April, also yielded no contacts, but on her third, which began at Subic Bay in the Philippines on 28 April, she sank two small schooners. Their use illustrated graphically the almost complete loss of modern merchant ships which the Japanese had suffered largely at the hands of the U.S. Navy.

Returning to Fremantle 27 June from her patrol area off southern Indo-China and western Borneo, the submarine refitted for her fourth war patrol, during which she performed three dangerous special missions, landing and later evacuating agents from the coast of Java. On this patrol, which took place from 22 July to the end of hostilities, she sank another Japanese schooner. She returned to Subic Bay 19 August, then sailed for the West Coast.

Post-World War II, Caiman operated out of San Diego, Guam, and Pearl Harbor in 1946. In 1947 she made an Arctic familiarization cruise out of Seattle as part of Operation Blue Nose. Thereafter, based on Seattle, she served as reserve training ship until 23 April 1951, when she began a GUPPY conversion at Mare Island Naval Shipyard. Since then based at Pearl Harbor and San Diego, Caiman has alternated local operations and fleet exercises with tours of duty in the Far East at 18-month intervals. On her 1957 cruise, Brisbane, Australia, was added to her more usual itinerary of Japanese and Philippine ports.

== Career (Turkey) ==
Caiman was decommissioned, struck from the Naval Register, and transferred to Turkey on 30 June 1972 under the terms of the Security Assistance Program. She arrived on 23 August 1972 to the Naval Yards in Gölcük and was commissioned the following day as the third TCG Dumlupınar (S-339) - an important name in Turkish history, and the name of the final and defining battle of the Turkish War of Independence.

Four years after Turkey took over ex-Caiman, she suffered a collision with Soviet freighter Szik Vovilov in the Dardanelles on 31 August 1976. Luckily, her crew was able to ground the submarine on a nearby bank, thus preventing the tragedy that befell the previous TCG Dumlupinar in 1953, the wreck site of which lay just 28 nautical miles (52 km; 32 mi) away. TCG Dumlupinar was subsequently salvaged, repaired, and continued to serve in the Turkish Navy for 11 years before she was decommissioned and renamed Ceryan Botu (Y-1247) on 6 February 1983, under which name she served as a charging boat at Gölcük Navy Yards until she was permanently retired on 15 September 1986.

== Honors and awards ==
- Navy Unit Commendation (August 1952)
- Asiatic-Pacific Campaign Medal with two battle stars for World War II service
- Navy Occupation Service Medal with "ASIA" clasp
- Navy E Ribbon (three awards: September 1955, 28 January 1966, 3 June 1972)

Of Caiman's four World War II war patrols, the last was designated "successful".
