= University of California Division of War Research =

The University of California Division of War Research (UCDWR) was created at Scripps Institution of Oceanography at the University of California, San Diego campus during World War II to aid the U.S. Navy in war-related research.

== Origins ==
Following the outbreak of World War II, German U-boats began targeting merchant and passenger vessels in 1939, prompting the U.S. Navy to review its readiness to counter this threat. At the behest of the Navy, the National Academy of Sciences established a subcommittee on submarine detection which ultimately concluded that the Navy's "methods had hardly progressed since 1918" and recommended that the Navy create programs tasked development of instruments capable of detecting and measuring underwater occurrences. In 1940, the National Defense Research Committee, by request of the Navy, established two laboratories, with one on the Atlantic coast of the U.S. and the other on the Pacific coast. The latter was established at the U.S. Naval Radio and Sound Laboratory (NRSL), located at Naval Base Point Loma, San Diego. There, the University of California Division of War Research (UCWDR) was established with the University of California (UC) as the contract agency. The creation of UCDWR marked the first collaboration between the Navy and UC on wartime research. The Navy also informally referred to UCDWR as the San Diego Laboratory.

“Some $12 million in research funds were granted to Scripps during the war to undertake research in submarine acoustics.” ... “The Navy also provided funding for a series of important Scripps expeditions to the Pacific, including several linked to Pacific atomic tests.” (Benson 530)

== Personnel ==
Dr. Vern Knudsen, an acoustical physicist, came from UCLA to become the first leader of UCDWR.

UCDWR recruited most of its staff from universities and colleges, as well as industrial and technical groups. Because of the initial general lack of knowledge of the context in which the staff would be applying their skills to, a large portion of the beginning was spent training them.

Additionally, several people involved with the film industry were recruited from Hollywood, given that they were among the few who were familiar with electrical recording and projecting of sound; some of these people would be involved in the development of sonar.

== Research ==
From 1942 to 1943, UCDWR was mainly focused on researching methods of detecting submerged submarines acoustically in order to rectify the Navy's inability to effectively employ its sonar equipment. While the Navy did have sonar schools, it was limited to teaching seamen how to operate and maintain their sonar equipment. Knowledge of marine factors affecting the underwater transmission of sound was not deeply explored. Together with NRSL, UCDWR conducted research and experiments exploring how currents, organisms, water temperature, salinity, depth, and the sea floor affected noise. The joint efforts of NRSL and UCDWR created an oceanographic scientific field that added to the Navy's ability to accurately detect sounds underwater, as well as measure listening ranges.

== Technology Development ==
=== Sound Beacons ===
Besides making gains in a research capacity, UCDWR was also responsible for developing devices for the submariners. The more successful projects involved the development of various sound beacons, which were used by submarine crews to prevent enemy anti-submarine vessels from tracking them. The NAC, NAG, NAH, and NAD (which were improvements from their respective predecessors) were designed to be released by submarines and remain stationary in the water while transmitting a signal at the same frequency of the enemy vessel, effectively jamming its sonar.

Then followed a series of devices which were true decoys rather than jammers. The NAD-3 was one such device; instead of floating at a preset depth, it would be driven by a propeller and could follow a preset series of turns to simulate a submarine acoustically.

=== Sonar ===
In 1944, UCDWR completed a working sonar system called QLA, which was an evolution of an earlier project called Ethoscope. QLA was the first sonar to visually plot multiple contacts on a screen. This capability was used to great effect in offensive operations late in the war when Navy submarines safely navigated the minefields guarding the Kuriles and the Strait of Tsushima by plotting the locations of the mines; the submarines infiltrated Japanese shipping lanes and sank 100,000 tons in June 1945 alone.

== Postwar ==
After World War II ended in 1945, UCDWR came under the Naval Electronics Laboratory's authority. In June 1946, UCDWR formally became the Marine Physical Laboratory and was subsequently absorbed into the Scripps Institution of Oceanography in April 1948.
