= USS Cabezon =

Submarine of the United States

Coordinates: 50°23′N 155°06′E

History

United States
- Builder: Electric Boat Company, Groton, Connecticut
- Laid down: 18 November 1943
- Launched: 27 August 1944
- Commissioned: 30 December 1944
- Decommissioned: 24 October 1953
- Stricken: 15 May 1970
- Fate: Sold for scrap, 28 December 1971

General characteristics
- Class & type: Balao class diesel-electric submarine
- Displacement: 1,526 tons (1,550 t) surfaced; 2,424 tons (2,463 t) submerged
- Length: 311 ft 9 in (95.02 m)
- Beam: 27 ft 3 in (8.31 m)
- Draft: 16 ft 10 in (5.13 m) maximum
- Propulsion: 4 × General Motors Model 16-278A V16 diesel engines driving electrical generators; 2 × 126-cell Sargo batteries; 4 × high-speed General Electric electric motors with reduction gears; 2 × propellers; 5,400 shp (4.0 MW) surfaced; 2,740 shp (2.0 MW) submerged
- Speed: 20.25 knots (38 km/h) surfaced; 8.75 knots (16 km/h) submerged
- Range: 11,000 nautical miles (20,000 km) surfaced at 10 knots (19 km/h)
- Endurance: 48 hours at 2 knots (3.7 km/h) submerged; 75 days on patrol
- Test depth: 400 ft (120 m)
- Complement: 10 officers, 70–71 enlisted
- Armament: 10 × 21-inch (533 mm) torpedo tubes; 6 forward, 4 aft; 24 torpedoes; 1 × 5-inch (127 mm) / 25 caliber deck gun; Bofors 40 mm and Oerlikon 20 mm cannon

USS Cabezon (SS-334) was a Balao-class submarine of the United States Navy, named for the cabezon, a saltwater fish of sculpin family inhabiting the North Atlantic and North Pacific Oceans (cabezon means "big head" in Spanish).

== History ==
Cabezon was launched 27 August 1944 by Electric Boat Company, Groton, Connecticut; sponsored by Mrs. Adelaide Prescott Cooley (née Morris), wife of Captain Thomas Ross Cooley, commanding officer of USS Washington; and commissioned 30 December 1944.

=== World War II ===
Cabezon departed New London, Connecticut, 19 February 1945 for Key West, Florida, where she underwent 3 weeks of training and providing services for the Fleet Sound School. She then sailed via the Panama Canal, to Pearl Harbor, arriving 15 March 1945.

From 25 May to 11 July 1945 Cabezon conducted her first war patrol in the Sea of Okhotsk, sinking a 2,631-ton Japanese cargo vessel on 19 June. She refitted at Midway until 4 August, then departed for Saipan to serve as target ship for surface force training exercises.

=== Post war service ===
From 7 September 1945 until 12 January 1946 she engaged in local operations and training in Philippine waters, based at Subic Bay.

On 6 February 1946 Cabezon arrived at San Diego, operating from that port until her base was changed to Pearl Harbor. Subsequent to her arrival there on 20 November 1946, she participated in local operations and training cruises for submariners of the Naval Reserve there and on the west coast with intervening cruises to the South Pacific, the North Pacific, and in 1947 participated in Operation Blue Nose in the Chukchi Sea. She also made two cruises to the Far East (18 March – 29 July 1950 and 21 April – 16 October 1952), the second of which included a reconnaissance patrol in the vicinity of La Perouse Strait, between Hokkaidō, Japan, and Sakhalin, U.S.S.R.

Cabezon sailed for Mare Island 21 April 1953 to start inactivation and was placed out of commission in reserve there 24 October 1953 and laid up in the Pacific Reserve Fleet. Struck from the Naval Register, 15 May 1970, she was sold for scrapping, 28 December 1971.

== Awards ==
- Combat Action Ribbon
- Asiatic-Pacific Campaign Medal with one battle star for World War II service
- World War II Victory Medal
- Navy Occupation Service Medal with "ASIA" clasp
- China Service Medal
- National Defense Service Medal
- Korean Service Medal
- Republic of Korea Presidential Unit Citation (Republic of Korea)
- United Nations Korea Medal (United Nations)
- Korean War Service Medal (Republic of Korea)

Cabezon's single war patrol was designated "successful". She is credited with having sunk a total of 2,631 tons of shipping.

== Notable former crew ==
- Theodore F. Brophy, World War II
