= Arctic Submarine Laboratory =

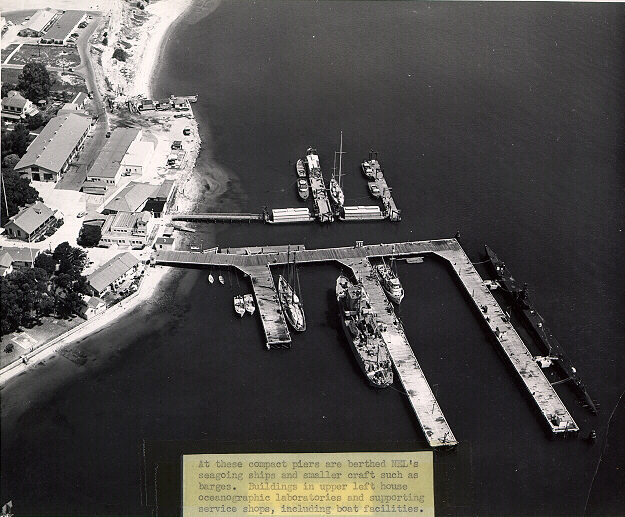
At these compact piers were berthed NEL's seagoing ships and smaller craft.

The Arctic Submarine Laboratory is a research facility of the U.S. Navy's Undersea Warfighting Development Center in San Diego, California. It began as a converted World War II mortar emplacement, Battery Whistler, and was focused on scientific exploration of the Arctic Basin, and particularly providing the capability to operate attack submarines in the Arctic under the ice canopy.

== Founder ==
In 1941, Dr. Waldo K. Lyon started work at the Navy Radio and Sound Lab, as their first Ph.D. physicist. He was charged with forming and directing initial efforts of the Sound Division. The lab was used during World War II for testing, repairing and modifying submarine equipment and harbor defense systems in the Pacific Ocean.

Lyon recalls the creation of the Arctic Submarine Laboratory after the war:

"In 1946 when Admiral Byrd took the expedition to Antarctica, I got a letter asking if there was any research I wanted to do in conjunction with the expedition. I said yes, try a submarine in the cold water down there"

His recommendation initiated an effort that would last over four decades.

== Creation of the laboratory ==
In 1947, with the merger of Navy Radio and Sound Laboratory and the University of California Division of War Research into the Navy Electronics Laboratory (NEL), Dr. Lyon became head of the Submarine Studies Branch in the Research Division.

A test pool was constructed at Battery Whistler (a converted mortar battery at NEL) to test equipment for deep submergence vehicles like Bathyscaphe Trieste. The pool was equipped to grow sea ice and study its physical properties. The new facility also included a field station at Cape Prince of Wales, Alaska, established in 1951.

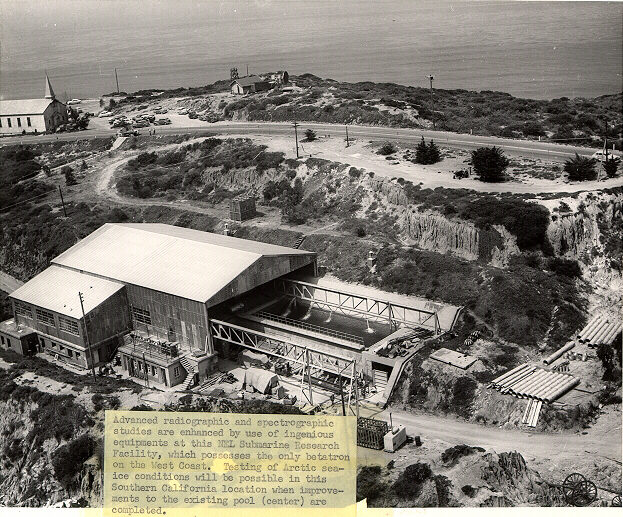
Advanced radiographic and spectrographic studies were enhanced by use of equipment at this NEL Submarine Research Facility, which possessed the only betatron on the West Coast.

The Arctic Submarine Lab also included a sea ice cryostat for testing scale-model submarine sails punching up through the ice; and possessed the only betatron on the West Coast for examination into the structures of heavy objects and metals up to 18 inches (46 cm) in diameter.

== Mission and accomplishments ==
Equipment and techniques were designed and tested to enable submarine operation in the Arctic Ocean. Brine content and ice elasticity were measured to apply in the design of submarines that could surface through the ice cover. Cold rooms and calibration facilities at the Arctic Submarine Laboratory were used to solve the problem of icing on submarine snorkel head valves.

Dr. Lyon and researcher Art Roshon developed an under-ice sonar that allowed completion of the first winter cruise by Sturgeon-class submarines by inverting a fathometer and putting it on top of the submarine.

The research culminated in the transpolar submerged voyage of USS Nautilus in 1958 and included scores of under-ice cruises to gain scientific knowledge essential to Arctic submarine operations.

Through the 1970s and 1980s the ongoing research at the Arctic Submarine Laboratory resulted in refurbishment and improvement of the Lab's cryogenic facilities. These facilities were used for evaluating icing issues on Los Angeles-class submarines, sonar technology developments for remote acoustic measurement of ice thickness, and the ice breakthrough tests for Seawolf-class submarines.

In 2020 the ASL participated in ICEX.

The Lab continues today with its primary missions, developing new technology for the use of US submarines heading under the polar ice pack and providing operations staff to assist in taking submarines under the ice pack.

== See also ==
- U.S. Arctic Research Commission
