= Waldo K. Lyon =

American physicist and explorer

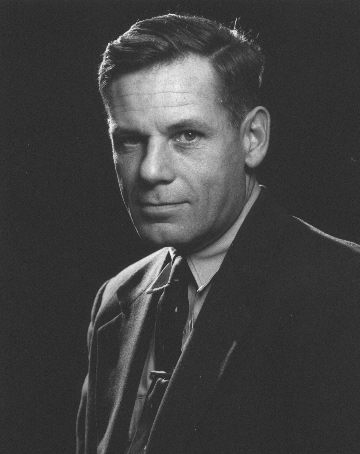
- Dr. Waldo K. Lyon
- Born: May 19, 1914; Los Angeles
- Died: May 5, 1998 (aged 83); San Diego
- Education: Doctor of Philosophy
- Alma mater: University of California, Los Angeles
- Occupation: Physicist; explorer
- Employer: Navy Electronics Laboratory (1941–1996)
- Awards: Navy Distinguished Civilian Service Award; Presidential Unit Citation
- Branch: United States Navy

Waldo Kampmeier Lyon (May 19, 1914 – May 5, 1998) was the founder and chief research scientist for the U.S. Navy of the Arctic Submarine Laboratory at the Naval Electronics Laboratory.

He retired in 1996 after 55 years of government service. During his career he advised top Navy officials on essential matters of national defense and was personally thanked by Presidents Eisenhower and Kennedy for his efforts.

== Military career ==
For 51 years, Lyon worked for Space and Naval Warfare Systems Center, San Diego (SSC San Diego) and its predecessor organizations. Lyon started work there less than a year after its June 1940 establishment as the Navy Radio and Sound Lab, as their first Ph.D. physicist. He was charged with forming and directing initial efforts of the Sound Division. The lab was used during World War II for testing, repairing and modifying submarine equipment and harbor defense systems in the Pacific Ocean. During the war, German U-boats in the Gulf of St. Lawrence were undetectable, because sonar failed under the surface ice. Dr. Lyon addressed this problem by designing and testing sonar and oceanographic equipment for the submarine USS Boarfish and participating in the ship's first under-ice dives.

"In 1946 when Admiral Byrd took the expedition to Antarctica, I got a letter asking if there was any research I wanted to do in conjunction with the expedition. I said yes, try a submarine in the cold water down there," Dr. Lyon said.

His recommendation initiated an effort that would last over four decades.

In 1947 Lyon became head of the Naval Electronics Laboratory's, Submarine Studies Branch in the Research Division.

Lyon had a test pool constructed at Battery Whistler (a converted mortar battery at NEL) to test equipment for deep submergence vehicles like Bathyscaphe Trieste. The pool was equipped to grow sea ice and study its physical properties. In addition, he established a field station at Cape Prince of Wales, Alaska in 1951.

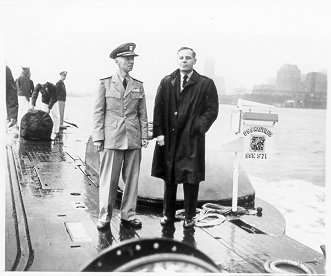
Waldo Lyon with Admiral Hyman G. Rickover aboard USS Nautilus

Equipment and techniques were designed and tested to enable submarine operation in the Arctic Ocean. Brine content and ice elasticity were measured to apply in the design of submarines that could surface through the ice cover. Cold rooms and calibration facilities at the Arctic Submarine Laboratory were used to solve the problem of icing on submarine snorkel head valves. The research culminated in the transpolar submerged voyage of USS Nautilus in 1958.

Lyon's career included scores of under-ice cruises to gain scientific knowledge essential to Arctic submarine operations. He and researcher Art Roshon developed an under-ice sonar that allowed completion of the first winter cruise by Sturgeon-class submarines. Through the 1970s and 1980s Lyon's ongoing research at the Arctic Submarine Laboratory resulted in refurbishment and improvement of the Lab's cryogenic facilities. These facilities were used for evaluating icing issues on Los Angeles-class submarines, sonar technology developments for remote acoustic measurement of ice thickness, and the ice breakthrough tests for Seawolf-class submarines.

== Awards ==
Lyon received major awards including:

- The Navy Distinguished Civilian Service Award (three times, in 1955, 1956, and 1958)
- The Department of Defense Distinguished Civilian Service Award
- The President's Award for Distinguished Federal Civilian Service in 1962
- He was a member of teams that earned the Presidential Unit Citation (US) in 1958 and 1969
- He received the Navy Unit Commendation in 1959, 1960, 1962, 1970, 1973, 1975, 1976, 1977, 1978 and 1979.

He also received numerous non-governmental awards including:

- Gold Medal of the American Society of Naval Engineers
- Silver Century Medal of Societe de Geographie (Paris)
- Bronze Medal of the Royal Institute of Navigation (London)
- Bushnell Medal of the American Defense Preparedness Association
- The Lowell Thomas Medal of The Explorers Club (only the fourth time this medal has been awarded)

== Last years ==
Lyon remained active in Arctic research even after retirement. He collaborated with Dr. William M. Leary on a book detailing development of the submarine Arctic warfare program entitled, Under Ice: Waldo Lyon and the Development of the Arctic Submarine, published in January 1999. Less than two weeks before his death, he met with the president of the prestigious Explorer's Club to plan an expedition to the North Pole. They had planned to dive to the sea floor at the Pole. He died at the age of 84 on May 5, 1998. A memorial service was held on June 20, 1998, at the First Unitarian Universalist Church of San Diego. Per his family's wishes, Lyon's ashes were scattered at the North Pole by USS Hawkbill on May 3, 1999.

Friends and colleagues of Lyon have established a memorial scholarship, administered by the UCLA Foundation, to be awarded to a deserving student in the physics department at the University of California, Los Angeles (UCLA), Dr. Lyon's alma mater.
