= USS Moray =

Submarine of the United States

Coordinates: 33.425°N 117.629°W

History

United States
- Name: Moray
- Namesake: Moray eel
- Builder: Cramp Shipbuilding Co., Philadelphia, Pennsylvania
- Yard number: 555
- Laid down: 21 April 1943
- Launched: 14 May 1944
- Commissioned: 26 January 1945
- Decommissioned: 12 April 1946
- Stricken: 1 April 1967
- Fate: Sunk as a target off Southern California, 18 June 1970

General characteristics
- Class & type: Balao class diesel-electric submarine
- Displacement: 1,526 tons (1,550 t) surfaced; 2,424 tons (2,463 t) submerged
- Length: 311 ft 8 in (95.00 m)
- Beam: 27 ft 3 in (8.31 m)
- Draft: 16 ft 10 in (5.13 m) maximum
- Propulsion: 4 × Fairbanks-Morse Model 38D8-1/8 9-cylinder opposed-piston diesel engines driving electrical generators; 2 × 126-cell Sargo batteries; 4 × high-speed Elliott electric motors with reduction gears; 2 × propellers; 5,400 shp (4.0 MW) surfaced; 2,740 shp (2.04 MW) submerged
- Speed: 20.25 knots (38 km/h) surfaced; 8.75 knots (16 km/h) submerged
- Range: 11,000 nautical miles (20,000 km) surfaced at 10 knots (19 km/h)
- Endurance: 48 hours at 2 knots (3.7 km/h) submerged; 75 days on patrol
- Test depth: 400 ft (120 m)
- Complement: 10 officers, 70–71 enlisted
- Armament: 10 × 21-inch (533 mm) torpedo tubes; 6 forward, 4 aft; 24 torpedoes; 1 × 5-inch (127 mm) / 25 caliber deck gun; Bofors 40 mm and Oerlikon 20 mm cannon

USS Moray (SS-300), a Balao-class submarine, was a ship of the United States Navy named for the moray, a family of large eels found in crevices of coral reefs in tropical and subtropical oceans.

== Construction and commissioning ==
Moray was laid down on 21 April 1943 at Cramp Shipbuilding Company, Philadelphia, Pennsylvania; launched on 14 May 1944, sponsored by Mrs. Styles Bridges, wife of the New Hampshire Senator; and commissioned on 26 January 1945.

== Operational history ==
Moray departed Philadelphia 31 January 1945, arriving New London, Connecticut, 1 February (The Moray accidentally rammed a coal barge Annapolis; there were no deaths.). After shakedown training there and off Newport, Rhode Island, Moray left New London with Carp (SS-338) and Gillette (DE-681) 14 April for Balboa, Panama, C.Z., arriving 25 April. Underway 5 May, Moray arrived Pearl Harbor 21 May for final training, after which she sailed for the Marianas 7 June, arriving Saipan 20 June.

The submarine cleared Saipan 27 June for her first war patrol as the senior unit of a coordinated attack group including Sea Poacher (SS-406), Angler (SS-240), Cero (SS-225), Lapon (SS-260), and Carp (SS-338). Comdr. Barrows in Moray assigned stations when the group reached its patrol area off Tokyo 1 July. The first phase of this patrol centered on lifeguard duty. From 7 July to 9 July Moray's special mission was service as picketboat southeast of Honshū in preparation for 3rd Fleet bombardment. Then she continued lifeguard operations.

By June 1945, successful American submarine operations had made enemy targets almost nonexistent, and lifeguard duty became a vital mission for American submarines. However, Moray did get a chance at some action, when she and Kingfish (SS-234) attacked a convoy off Kinkazan, Honshū, 10 July. Allowing Kingfish to attack first, Moray then moved in to fire six torpedoes, then pulled out to rearm and permit Kingfish a second stab. A few moments later one of Moray's torpedoes hit a whaler "Fumi Maru No.6" {361 GRT}. No other shipping was sighted; on 16 July the patrol was shifted to the Kurile Islands. Moray completed her patrol at Midway 6 August 1945.

On 1 September 1945 Moray departed for the United States West Coast, arriving San Francisco, California, 11 September. She then went into deactivation overhaul at Mare Island Navy Yard. She decommissioned 12 April 1946 and entered the Pacific Reserve Fleet in January 1947. She was redesignated an "auxiliary research submarine" (AGSS-300) on 1 December 1962. She was struck from the Navy List 1 April 1967 and sunk as a torpedo target on 18 June 1970 off San Clemente, California.

== Honors and awards ==
Moray received one battle star for World War II service.
