= USS Competent =

Two ships of the United States Navy have borne the name USS Competent:

- USS Competent (AM-316), an Auk-class minesweeper operated from 1943 to 1955 and sold to Mexico and renamed ARM Ponciano Arriaga
- USS Competent (AFDM-6), an AFDM-3-class floating dry dock originally named YFD-62, named Compentent in 1979, operated from 1944 to 1997
