= List of United States submarine museum ships =

A number of submarines that were formerly operated by the United States Navy are on display:

== Complete display ==
Twenty-three are preserved as complete ships:

- USS Albacore (AGSS-569) – Portsmouth, New Hampshire
- USS Batfish (SS-310) – Muskogee, Oklahoma
- USS Becuna (SS-319) – Independence Seaport Museum in Philadelphia, Pennsylvania
- USS Blueback (SS-581) – Oregon Museum of Science and Industry in Portland, Oregon
- USS Bowfin (SS-287) – Pearl Harbor, Hawaii
- USS Cavalla (AGSS-244) – Galveston, Texas
- USS Cobia (SS-245) – Wisconsin Maritime Museum in Manitowoc, Wisconsin
- USS Cod (SS-224) – Cleveland, Ohio
- USS Croaker (SS-246) – Buffalo and Erie County Naval & Military Park in Buffalo, New York
- USS Drum (SS-228) – Battleship Memorial Park in Mobile, Alabama
- USS Growler (SSG-577) – Intrepid Museum in New York, New York
- USS Ling (SS-297) – Hackensack, New Jersey
- USS Lionfish (SS-298) – Battleship Cove in Fall River, Massachusetts
- USS Marlin (SST-2) – Freedom Park in Omaha, Nebraska
- USS Nautilus (SSN-571) – Submarine Force Library and Museum in Groton, Connecticut
- USS Pampanito (SS-383) – San Francisco Maritime National Park Association in San Francisco, California
- USS Razorback (SS-394) – Arkansas Inland Maritime Museum in North Little Rock, Arkansas
- USS Requin (AGSS-481) – Kamin Science Center in Pittsburgh, Pennsylvania
- USS Silversides (SS-236) – Muskegon, Michigan
- USS Torsk (SS-423) – Historic Ships in Baltimore in Baltimore, Maryland
- Intelligent Whale – National Guard Militia Museum of New Jersey in Sea Girt, New Jersey
- Fenian Ram – Paterson, New Jersey

== Partial display ==
The sails of eighteen other submarines are also on display:

- USS Boston (SSN-703) – Buffalo and Erie County Naval & Military Park in Buffalo, New York
- USS Flasher (SS-249) – Groton, Connecticut
- USS George Bancroft (SSBN-643) – Naval Submarine Base Kings Bay in St. Marys, Georgia
- USS George Washington (SSBN-598) – Submarine Force Library and Museum in Groton, Connecticut
- USS Grayling (SSN-646) – Portsmouth Naval Shipyard in Kittery, Maine
- USS Hawkbill (SSN-666) – Idaho Science Center in Arco, Idaho
- USS Indianapolis (SSN-697) – Indiana Military Museum in Vincennes, Indiana
- USS James K. Polk (SSBN-645) – National Museum of Nuclear Science & History in Albuquerque, New Mexico
- USS Lewis and Clark (SSBN-644) – Patriots Point in Mt Pleasant, South Carolina
- USS Mariano G. Vallejo (SSBN-658) – Mare Island Museum in Vallejo, California
- USS Nathanael Greene (SSBN-636) – Port Canaveral, Florida
- USS Parche (SSN-683) – Puget Sound Navy Museum in Bremerton, Washington
- USS Pintado (SS-387) – National Museum of the Pacific War in Fredericksburg, Texas
- USS Sailfish (SS-192) – Portsmouth Naval Shipyard in Kittery, Maine
- USS Sturgeon (SSN-637) – United States Naval Undersea Museum in Keyport, Washington
- USS Tautog (SSN-639) – Galveston, Texas
- USS Triton (SSRN-586) – Richland, Washington
- USS Woodrow Wilson (SSBN-624) – Naval Base Kitsap near Silverdale, Washington

== Other Navy memorials ==
- United States Navy Memorial#Other Navy memorials

== See also ==
- List of submarine museums
