= Seawolf Park =

Park in the United States of America

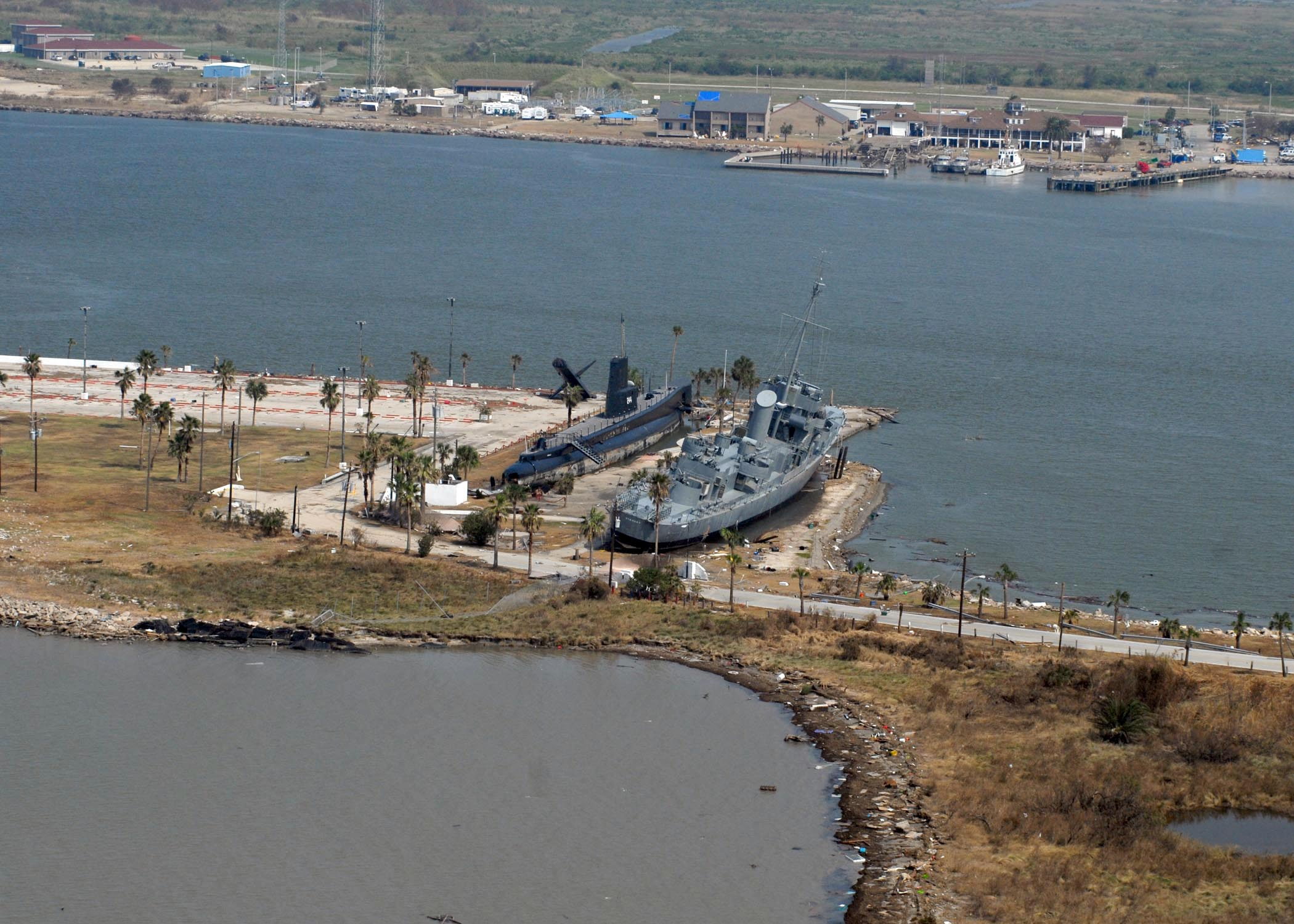
Damage in Seawolf Park following Hurricane Ike in 2008

Seawolf Park is a memorial to USS Seawolf (SS-197), a United States Navy Sargo-class submarine mistakenly sunk by U.S. Navy forces in 1944 during World War II. It is located on Pelican Island (29°20′03″N 94°46′45″W), just north of Galveston, Texas, in the United States. The park has two museum ships; Gato class submarine USS Cavalla (SS-244) and Edsall class destroyer escort USS Stewart (DE-238,) along with parts from three other vessels and offshore the remains of a former merchant ship. Other activities at the park include a picnic area and fishing.

== History ==
Following World War II, the United States Congress decreed that each state shall create a memorial park to one of the United States Navy submarines lost during the war. Texas chose a site on Pelican Island in Galveston, a former location for immigration in the state. In 1971, the Gato-class submarine USS Cavalla (SS-244) was transferred from the United States Navy and towed to the site of the park. The park was named after the submarine USS Seawolf (SS-197) which was lost in the Pacific Ocean during World War II.

== Attractions ==
Seawolf Park is unique in that it has a submarine, the remains of a merchant ship, and a destroyer escort designed to conduct anti-submarine warfare—the hunter, hunted, and the protector—all in one museum area. It is the home of two preserved U.S. Navy ships, the USS Cavalla and the Edsall-class destroyer escort USS Stewart (DE-238), and the remains of the World War I tanker SS Selma, the largest concrete ship constructed, can be seen northwest of the park's fishing pier at 29°20′40″N 94°47′10″W. Also preserved at the park is the conning tower of the Balao-class submarine USS Carp (SS-338) and the sail of the Sturgeon-class nuclear attack submarine USS Tautog (SSN-639). Cavalla is listed on the National Register of Historic Places and Stewart in listed as a National Historic Landmark.

Two bronze, fifty-six-inch (1,400 mm) ship propellers formerly attached to USS Stewart can be seen alongside the ladder going up to Stewart's deck. Each weighs over a ton and were powered by two diesel engines giving the destroyer escort 6,000 horsepower (4,500 kW) and a maximum speed of 21 knots (39 km/h; 24 mph). The propellers were removed from the ship so they can be seen by visitors. Behind the propellers are two 3-inch (76 mm), 50-caliber memorial guns donated from the battleship USS Texas.

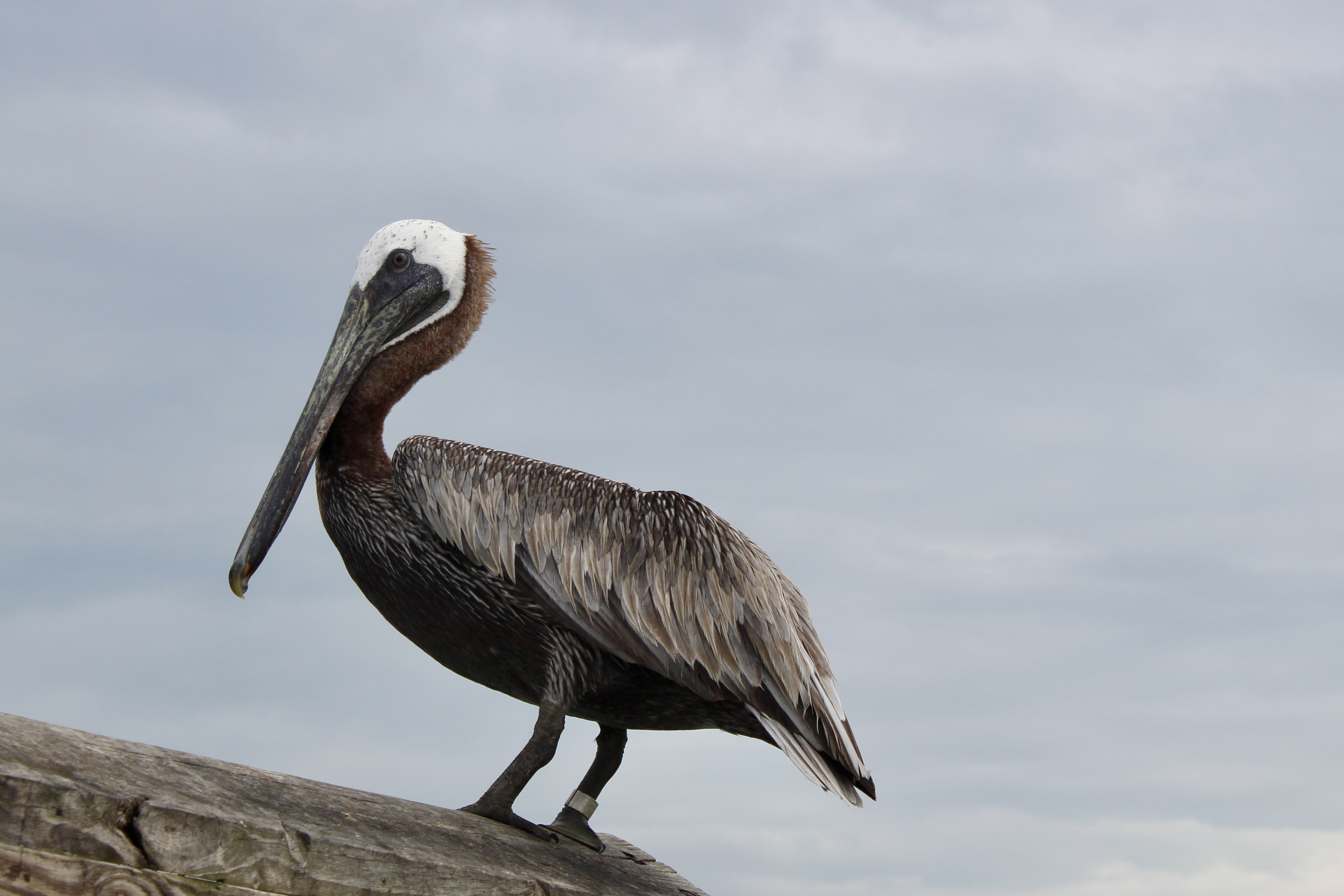
A brown pelican at Seawolf Park.

The park has a picnic area, and fishing is allowed on the pier for a small fee. There is also pedestrian access to the shoreline on either side of the park where anglers can fish for free. Fish that can be caught in the park area include sand seatrout, speckled trout, gafftopsail catfish, drum, and flounder, among others.

== See also ==
- List of United States submarines designated as memorials
- List of maritime museums in the United States
- List of museum ships
