= Japanese netlayer Shunsen Maru =

History

Empire of Japan
- Name: Yoshi Maru (代志丸)
- Builder: Namura Shipbuilding Works (名村造船鐵工所), Osaka
- Launched: February 1920
- Sponsored by: Sato Shokai K.K.
- Completed: 1920
- Home port: Kumihama (jp:久美浜町)
- Identification: 26746; Call sign: RVTL
- Fate: Sold to Chosen Yusen Co., Ltd., November 1924
- Acquired: November 1924 by Chosen Yusen Co., Ltd.
- Renamed: Shunsen Maru
- Home port: Incheon
- Identification: Call sign: FGMW; Call sign: JEKG (from 1934)
- Fate: Requisitioned by Imperial Japanese Navy, 4 December 1941

Empire of Japan
- Name: Shunsen Maru (春川丸)
- Acquired: 4 December 1941
- Stricken: 10 April 1945
- Home port: Jinsen
- Identification: C1110; Call sign: JEKG
- Fate: Torpedoed and sunk, 5 January 1945

General characteristics
- Class & type: Steamer
- Tonnage: 971 GRT
- Length: 59 m (193 ft 7 in) o/a
- Beam: 9.4 m (30 ft 10 in)
- Draught: 5.6 m (18 ft 4 in)
- Propulsion: 1 diesel engine, single shaft, 1 screw
- Speed: 11.4 knots (21.1 km/h; 13.1 mph)
- Armament: 1 x 8 cm/40 3rd Year Type naval gun 1 x Type 93 13 mm AT/AA machine gun 1 x Lewis gun 24 depth charges 4 x Type 14 capture nets 1 x hanging hydrophone

Shunsen Maru (Japanese: 春川丸) was a steel-hulled steamer that was converted into an auxiliary net layer by the Imperial Japanese Navy during World War II.

== History ==
She was launched as Yoshi Maru (代志丸) in February 1920 (Taisho 9) at the Osaka shipyard of Namura Shipbuilding Works (名村造船鐵工所) for the benefit of Sato Shokai K.K. and completed later in the year. In November 1924, she was purchased by Chosen Yusen Co., Ltd. (朝鮮郵船株式會社) and renamed Shunsen Maru (春川丸) although she is also listed as Harukawa Maru. She worked as a fishing vessel before being briefly requisitioned by the Imperial Japanese Navy from until 10 May 1923 until 6 November 1923. Serving in the Yokosuka Guard District, Yokosuka Naval District, her first task was laying buoys to mark the route to Alexandrovsk which had been seized from the Russians during the Japanese intervention in Siberia and thereafter mostly worked as a replenishment vessel for steam vessels (coal, water, food). She returned to the private sector until the advent of World War II. Her call sign was changed to JEKG sometime in 1934.

On 4 December 1941, she was requisitioned by the Imperial Japanese Navy, commissioned on 20 December 1941 into the Sasebo Guard Force, Sasebo Naval District, and then sent to the shipyard of Tochigi Shoji K.K. for conversion into an auxiliary net layer. On 31 December 1941, she was reassigned to the Chinkai Guard District. On 18 November 1942, she was reassigned to the Southern Expeditionary Fleet.

On 5 January 1945, the US submarine Cavalla torpedoed and sank Shunsen Maru and her fellow auxiliary net layer Kanko Maru in the Java Sea at coordinates 05°00′S 112°20′E. She was struck from the Naval List on 10 April 1945.
