= Pelican Island (Texas) =

Island in Galveston, Texas

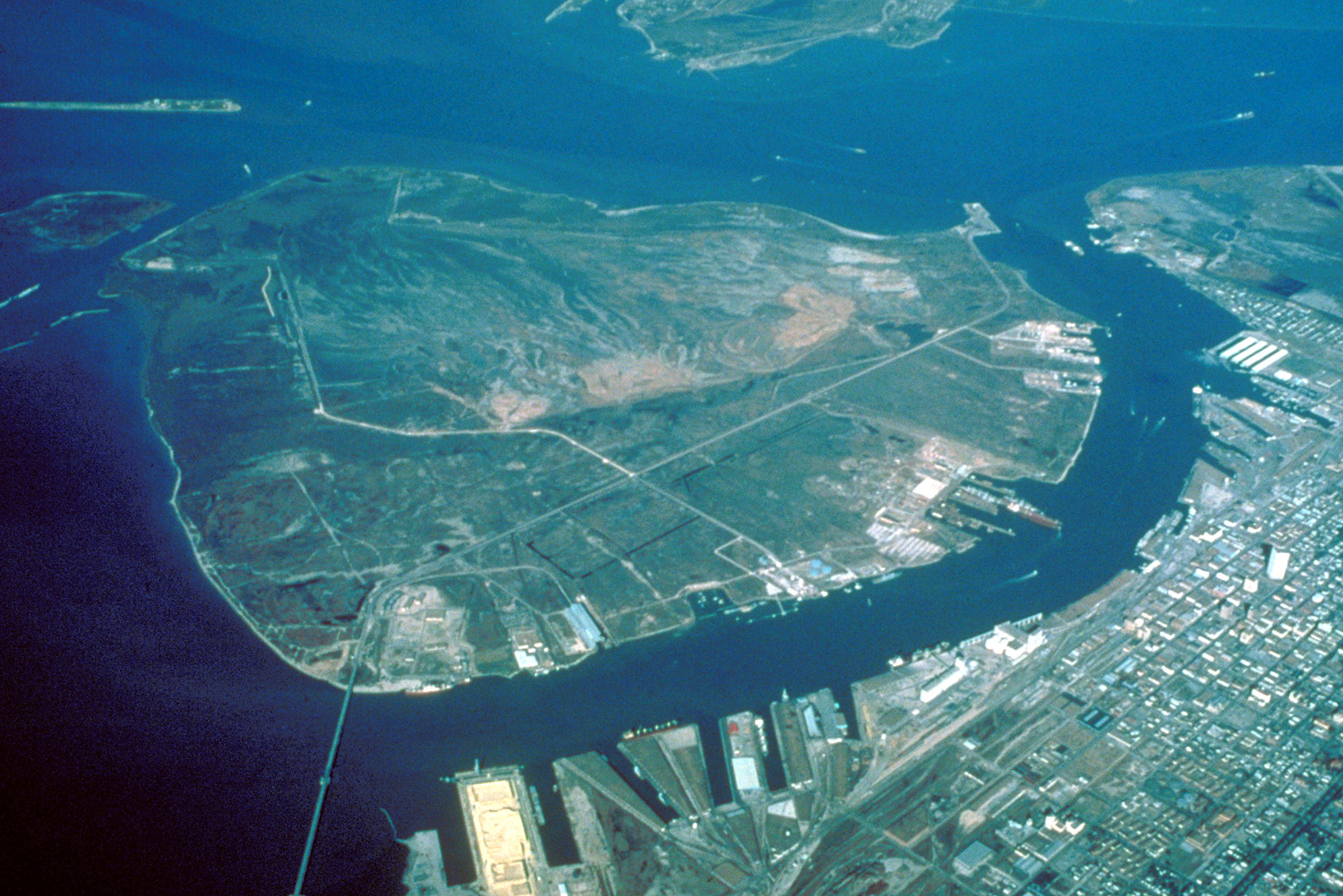
- Aerial photograph of Pelican Island, c.1999.

- Location within Texas

Geography
- Location: Galveston Bay
- Coordinates: 29.332°N 94.806°W
- Area: 6.4 sq mi (17 km^{2})
- Length: 2.85 mi (4.59 km)
- Width: 2.67 mi (4.3 km)
- Highest elevation: 20 ft (6 m)

Administration
- United States
- State: Texas
- County: Galveston County
- Largest settlement: Part of the City of Galveston (pop. 57,523)

Pelican Island is an island located in Galveston County, Texas. It is part of the city of Galveston and is linked to Galveston Island by the Pelican Island causeway. The island is home to the Texas A&M University at Galveston as well as two museum ships—the destroyer escort USS Stewart (DE-238) and the submarine USS Cavalla (SS-244)—and Seawolf Park. Seawolf Parkway is the only street that runs across the island. The Intracoastal Waterway borders it to the north, separating Pelican Island from another island.

The south side of the island is home to multiple facilities, such as dry docks, and tugboat operators, that support the maritime industry in Galveston, and the Galveston Texas City Pilots who navigate ships through Galveston Bay.

== History ==
The island is mostly artificial, having been grown to its current size in the early 20th century by spoil dredged from the main channel of Galveston.

Pelican Island began as two separate sand islands. Pelican Island was the larger of the two, and sat north of its neighbor, Pelican Spit. The islands were the only dry land within a large salt marsh. The first major construction on the island was a military fort built by the United States and completed by the Confederacy after Texas seceded in 1861.

The island was home to two different quarantine stations to house ill immigrants arriving by sea. One built in 1892 to handle the significant influx of immigrants arriving from Europe was destroyed in the 1900 Galveston hurricane, and another built in 1915, which closed in 1950.

In 1965, Galveston businessman George Mitchell purchased a large parcel of land on Pelican Island and donated some of it for the permanent home of Texas A&M University at Galveston.

== Texas A&M University at Galveston ==
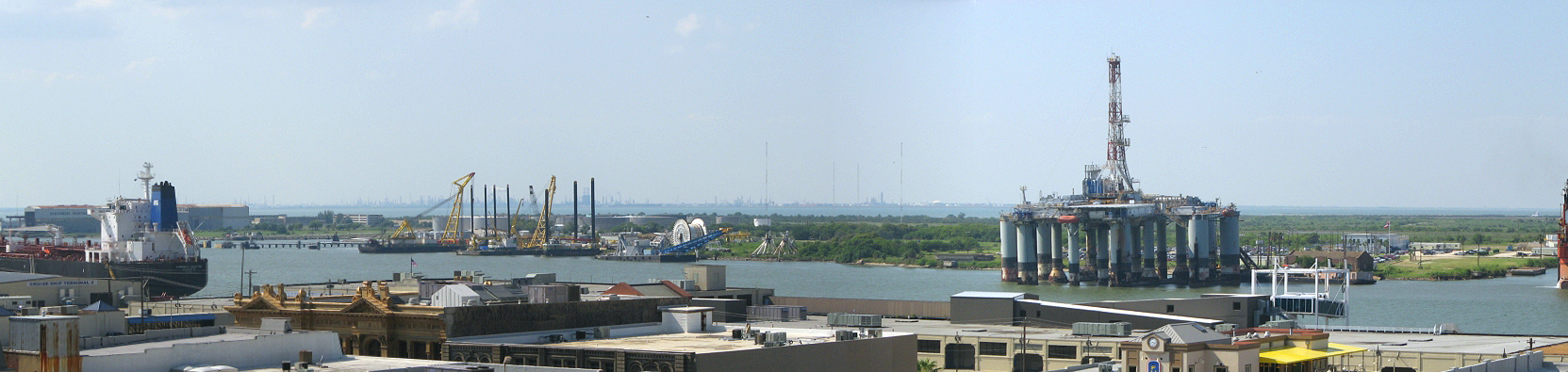
Panoramic view of the western portion of Pelican Island, including the campus of Texas A&M University at Galveston and the Galveston Ship Channel.

Texas A&M University at Galveston is the marine science and marine engineering focused branch of Texas A&M University.

The University is largest facility on the island, and university students represent the vast majority of the permanent population, as the 7 residence halls and an adjacent, privately owned apartment complex targeting student renters are the only housing.

== Industry ==
The southern side of the island has multiple industrial developments which support the maritime industry of Galveston, the largest of which is Gulf Copper and Manufacturing, a shipyard which, in 2022, partnered with the Battleship Texas Foundation and a neighboring marine salvage facility to dry dock the USS Texas and conduct extensive repairs.

== 2024 partial bridge collapse ==
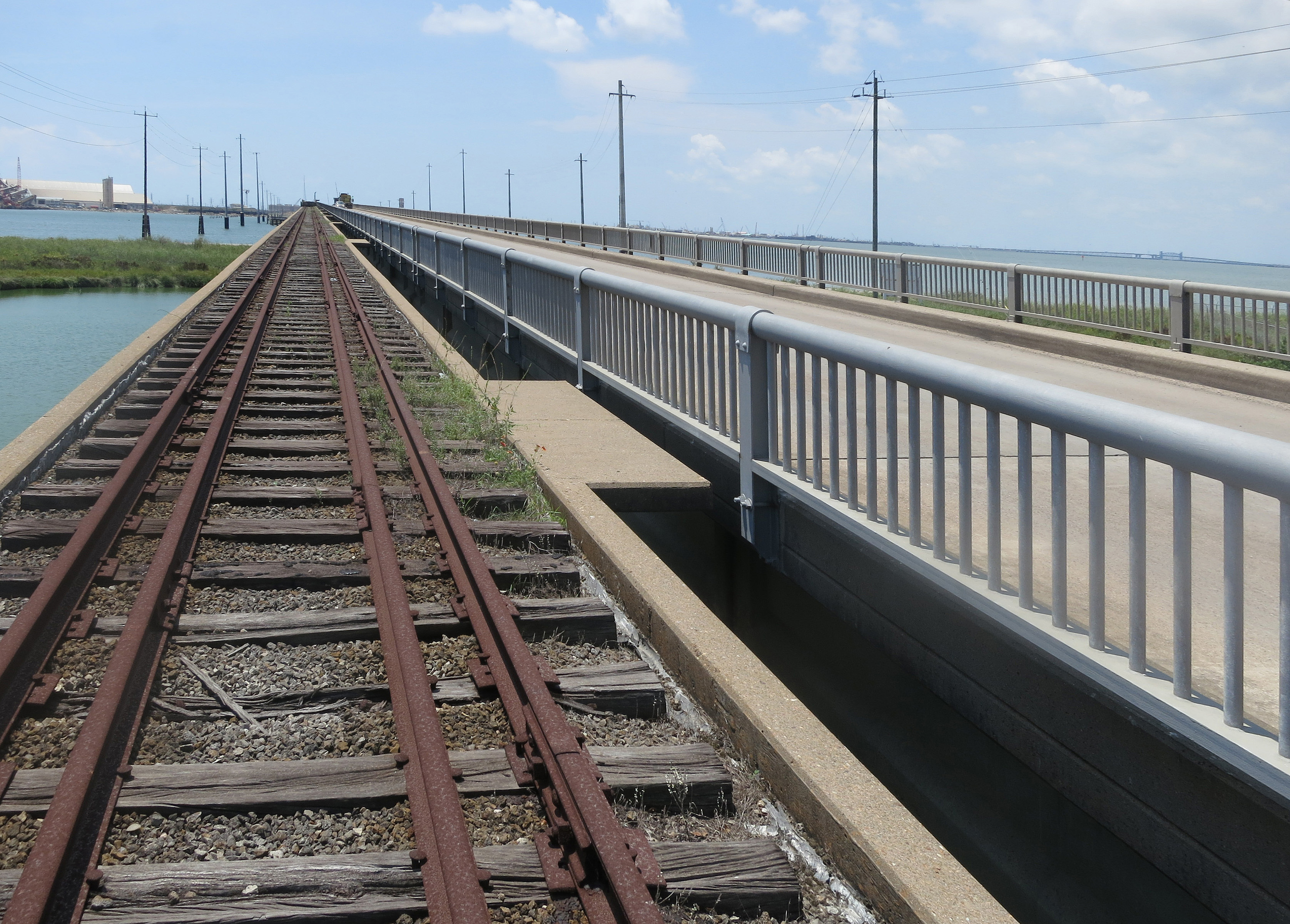
The island end of Galveston's Pelican Island Causeway taken from an abandoned railroad bridge running beside the causeway

On May 15, 2024, a tugboat leaving Texas International Terminals, a container terminal next to the Pelican Island causeway, the only bridge connecting the island to the rest of Galveston, lost control of two barges it was pushing. One of the barges, operated by Martin Operating Partnership, then hit the bridge and two telephone poles at approximately 10:00 CDT (3:00 GMT) collapsing a portion of the bridge, causing a diesel fuel spill, and causing a temporary power outage on the island. Two people were knocked off of the barge or jumped off, but they were quickly rescued. As a result of the collision, the bridge was closed. The barge, which reportedly has a capacity of 30,000 U.S. gal (110,000 L), spilled between 1,000 U.S. gal (3,800 L) and 2,000 U.S. gal (7,600 L) of oil. Some spilled oil stayed on top of the barge and did not leak into the water.

An approximate 6.5 mi (10.5 km) span of the Gulf Intracoastal Waterway was shut down around the bridge in order to help crews clean up the oil spill. Galveston County officials began evacuations for the approximately 200 people who were on the island at the time of the collapse for anyone who needed to leave the island, but warned that they would be unlikely to be able to return in the near future.

=== Proposals to replace the bridge ===
The collision incident energized public discourse about the bridge's age and poor condition, motivating the City of Galveston and Texas Department of Transportation to develop a plan to completely replace the obsolete causeway and bascule bridge with a new fixed-span bridge that has enough clearance at its main span to meet the requirements of the Gulf Intracoastal Waterway. The proposed bridge would have a 65-foot-wide deck, with two vehicle lanes, and a single shared-use path.

Multiple organizations, including the Port of Galveston and Port of Houston, have supported an alternative proposal that would also see the original causeway demolished, but replaced with a non-elevated causeway on an earthen embankment. This would allow for the construction of a railway in addition to the wider road and shared-use path, which proponents claim would stimulate economic development on the island.
