= USS Aspro (SSN-648) =

Submarine of the United States

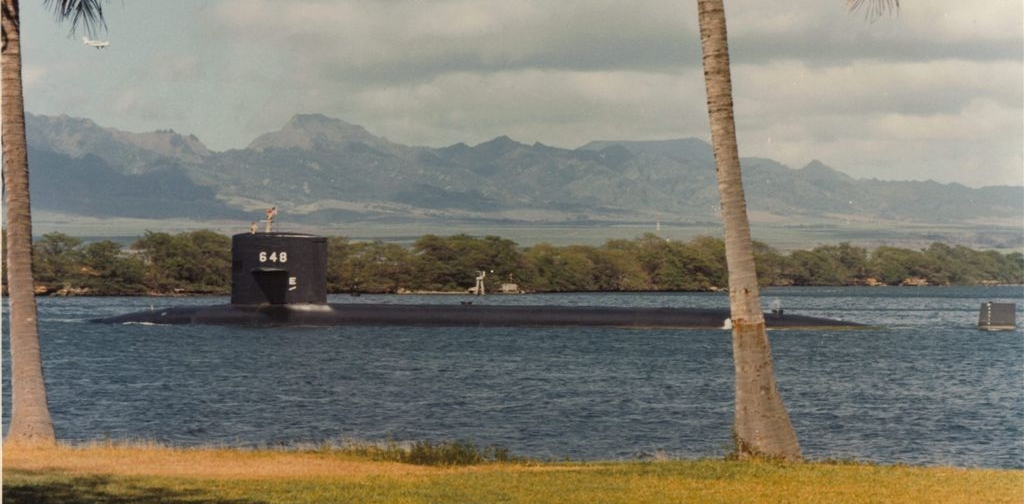
- USS Aspro (SSN-648)

History

United States
- Name: USS Aspro
- Namesake: The aspro, a fish found abundantly in the upper Rhone River
- Ordered: 26 March 1963
- Builder: Ingalls Shipbuilding, Pascagoula, Mississippi
- Laid down: 23 November 1964
- Launched: 29 November 1967
- Sponsored by: Mrs. Robert H. B. Baldwin
- Commissioned: 20 February 1969
- Decommissioned: 31 March 1995
- Stricken: 31 March 1995
- Home port: Pearl Harbor
- Motto: Faith – Vigilance – Service
- Honors and awards: Battle Efficiency Award (Battle E) three times 1990–1994; Meritorious Unit Commendation 1994
- Fate: Scrapping via Ship and Submarine Recycling Program begun 1 October 1999, completed 3 November 2000

General characteristics
- Class & type: Sturgeon-class attack submarine
- Displacement: 4,140 long tons (4,206 t) surfaced; 4,650 long tons (4,725 t) submerged
- Length: 292 ft (89 m)
- Beam: 31 ft 8 in (9.65 m)
- Draft: 28 ft 8 in (8.74 m)
- Installed power: 15,000 shaft horsepower (11.2 megawatts)
- Propulsion: One S5W nuclear reactor, two steam turbines, one screw
- Speed: 15 knots surfaced; 25 knots submerged
- Test depth: 1,300 feet (400 meters)
- Complement: 108
- Armament: 4 × 21-inch (533 mm) torpedo tubes; Mark 48 torpedoes; UUM-44A SUBROC missiles; Tube-launched mobile mines; Tomahawk cruise missiles; Harpoon Anti-ship missiles

USS Aspro (SSN-648) was a Sturgeon-class submarine launched in 1969 and decommissioned in 1995. Scrapping was completed in 2000.

It was the second ship of the United States Navy to be named for the aspro, a fish of the Zingel genus found abundantly in the upper Rhone River.

== Construction and commissioning ==
The contract to build Aspro was awarded to Ingalls Shipbuilding in Pascagoula, Mississippi, on 26 March 1963 and her keel was laid down there on 23 November 1964. She was launched on 29 November 1967, sponsored by Mrs. Robert H. B. Baldwin, and commissioned on 20 February 1969 with Commander Roy Wight in command.

== Service history ==
=== 1969 ===
Aspro departed Pascagoula on 26 February 1969 for Key West, Florida, where she loaded torpedoes. She then headed to her home port, Pearl Harbor, Hawaii, transiting the Panama Canal on 8 March 1969, and arriving at Oahu in the Hawaiian Islands on 24 March 1969. She joined the United States Pacific Fleet as a member of Submarine Squadron 1 in Submarine Division 12. Following three weeks of upkeep at Pearl Harbor, she proceeded to Bangor, Washington, where she unloaded her torpedoes before entering the Puget Sound Naval Shipyard at Bremerton, Washington, on 23 April 1969 for alignment of her fire-control system. Leaving drydock on 4 May 1969, she held tests along the United States West Coast for one month before returning to Pearl Harbor on 8 June 1969.

Local operations occupied Aspro's time during the month of July 1969. In August 1969, she served as a school ship for prospective commanding officers and took part in two exercises, "Kilo 5–69" and "Holdex 4–69", carried out in the Hawaiian operating area. Weapons tests and a nuclear reactor safety examination preceded her entry into the Pearl Harbor Naval Shipyard that autumn for post-shakedown repairs.

=== 1970 ===
Aspro got underway again on 6 March 1970 to conduct sea trials around Hawaii, followed by weapons trials during April. From 18 May through 12 June 1970, upkeep at the Submarine Base Pearl Harbor occupied her time. She then began to prepare for a deployment.

On 19 July 1970, Aspro departed Pearl Harbor for a six-month Western Pacific deployment. She arrived in Yokosuka, Japan, on 10 September 1970 and commenced upkeep. On 29 September 1970, she visited Okinawa and, the next day, began more than a month of United States Seventh Fleet operations. She returned to Okinawa on 8 November 1970 and shifted to Subic Bay in the Philippines on 15 November for two weeks of upkeep. She sailed to Hong Kong late in November, providing services to aircraft along the way, and arrived at Hong Kong on 1 December 1970 for a week of leave and liberty. After an antisubmarine warfare exercise between 8 and 17 December 1970, she operated on "Yankee Station" in the Gulf of Tonkin in support of Vietnam War operations before returning to Subic Bay on 31 December 1970.

=== 1971 ===
Aspro left the Philippines on 2 January 1971 bound for Guam, where she spent several weeks engaged in tests before returning to Pearl Harbor on 5 February 1971. She spent the remainder of 1971 in Hawaii, alternating periods in port with exercises in the Hawaiian operating area.

=== 1972 ===
On 5 January 1972, Aspro commenced a restricted shipyard availability for alterations and repairs at the Pearl Harbor Naval Shipyard, which was followed by another month in upkeep. On 11 March 1972, she resumed operations in Hawaiian waters and, on 15 April, began preparations to deploy.

Aspro got underway for her second Western Pacific deployment on 13 May 1972 and arrived at Yokosuka on 24 June. After a week in port, she departed on 4 July 1972 to begin Seventh Fleet operations. She arrived at Pusan, South Korea, on 13 August 1972 for a two-day visit, then shifted to Sasebo, Japan, for three days. Following an exercise with one of her sister ships, the attack submarine USS Hawkbill (SSN-666), from 18 to 26 August, Aspro arrived at Hong Kong on 27 August 1972. On 2 September, she was underway for Guam, where she arrived on 7 September and began two weeks of upkeep. On 21 September, she put to sea to return to Pearl Harbor, arriving there on 18 November 1972. She remained in port there through the end of 1972.

=== 1973–1974 ===
Aspro operated in the Hawaiian area conducting tests until she left Pearl Harbor on 17 March 1973 bound for Pascagoula. She transited the Panama Canal on 28 March 1973 and commenced an overhaul at the Ingalls Shipbuilding Corporation's yards in Pascagoula on 1 April 1973.

The shipyard work ended on 12 May 1974, and Aspro departed Pascagoula the next day. After re-transiting the Panama Canal, she made liberty stops at San Diego, California, and Bremerton, then held acoustic trials in Puget Sound from 4 to 7 June 1974. She returned to Pearl Harbor on 19 June after an absence of more than 15 months and spent the rest of 1974 conducting operations in the Hawaiian Islands.

=== 1975 ===
The beginning of 1975 found Aspro preparing for her third deployment to the Western Pacific. After loading weapons, she left Pearl Harbor on 29 May 1975, conducted an exercise with the destroyer escort USS Rathburne (DE-1057) the next day, and reached Yokosuka on 10 June 1975 for a week's visit. On 19 June, she began operations at sea that lasted until 10 August 1975 when she arrived at Guam. She participated in exercises with units of the Seventh Fleet from 24 August to 3 September 1975, made voyage repairs at Subic Bay from 4 to 16 September, and carried out exercises near Subic Bay with the attack aircraft carrier USS Kitty Hawk (CVA-63) between 17 and 29 September 1975.

Aspro left the Philippines on 1 October 1975, bound for the Mariana Islands. She arrived at Guam in the Marianas on 5 October and remained there until 27 October to replace the battery with the assistance of the submarine tender. She then departed for Hong Kong. From 6 to 18 November 1975, she took part in antisubmarine warfare exercises with Seventh Fleet air and surface units. After pausing briefly at Guam, she returned to Pearl Harbor on 4 December 1975 and commenced a post-deployment stand down to allow her crew to rest and recuperate.

=== 1976–1978 ===
Aspro spent the first two and one-half months of 1976 in upkeep and on exercises. On 15 March 1976, she entered drydock at the Pearl Harbor Naval Shipyard. Upon completion of this work on 23 April 1976, she began sea trials, exercises, and final preparations for a tour of duty along the west coast of North America.

Aspro left Pearl Harbor on 6 September 1976 and stopped at Esquimalt, British Columbia, Canada, on 16 September for a two-day liberty call. She arrived at Bangor on 23 September 1976 to unload her weapons.

In October 1977, Aspro commenced an overhaul at the Puget Sound Naval Shipyard on Puget Sound at Bremerton, Washington. The overhaul included a refueling of the nuclear reactor; it was completed in March 1979, and Aspro then returned to Pearl Harbor.

=== 1979 ===
Aspro's overhaul was completed on 11 March 1979, when she got underway for sea and acoustic trials. On 28 April, she went to Bangor for weapons trials. She departed Bangor on 17 May 1979 and made a voyage to San Diego, conducting deep-water acoustic trials en route. Upon her arrival in San Diego on 22 May, she spent one week undergoing repairs by auxiliary repair dock USS San Onofre (ARD-30).

Aspro returned to Pearl Harbor on 8 June 1979 after an absence of 21 months and spent the remainder of 1979 conducting training exercises and antisubmarine warfare operations and preparing for a deployment in 1980.

=== 1980 ===
Aspro's pre-deployment preparations continued well into February 1980. She departed Pearl Harbor to begin her fourth Western Pacific deployment on 24 February 1980 and arrived in Buckner Bay, Okinawa, on 9 March. On 11 March, she put to sea to take part in Exercise "SHAREM 35." She returned briefly to Buckner Bay on 16 March then set out for the Philippines. She entered Subic Bay on 20 March 1980 and remained there until 6 April; when she got underway for Guamn in the Mariana Islands. Aspro stayed at Guam from 12 to 24 April 1980, then departed for Japan. She made a brief stop at Yokosuka on 4 May 1980 before embarking upon a month of operations at sea. She returned to Yokosuka on 10 June 1980 but put to sea again on 12 June on her way to Hong Kong for a liberty call there that lasted from 17 to 21 June. Aspro then headed back to Guam, where arrived on 27 June. She put back to sea on 16 July 1980 for her last operational assignment of the deployment. She concluded both that operation and the overall deployment by returning to Pearl Harbor on 30 August 1980.

Following the usual post-deployment stand-down period, Aspro resumed local operations in the Hawaiian Islands for the remainder of 1980.

=== 1981 ===
At the beginning of 1981, Aspro began a restricted shipyard availability for repairs and alterations at the Pearl Harbor Naval Shipyard that lasted until late in March 1981. On 26 March, she left the shipyard and resumed normal operations out of Pearl Harbor until midsummer 1981, when she began getting ready for another tour of duty in the Western Pacific.

Aspro stood out of Pearl Harbor to commence her fifth Western Pacific deployment on 2 September 1981. During the deployment, she visited a variety of ports in the Western Pacific and in the Indian Ocean. including a R&R port call to HMAS Stirling, Rockingham, Western Australia from 30 November – 7 December 1981, the only time Aspro would visit Western Australia. Aspro successfully prosecuted all her operational missions. She returned to Pearl Harbor on 16 March 1982 and commenced the normal month of post-deployment leave and upkeep.

=== 1982 ===
Aspro resumed operations out of Pearl Harbor in April 1982. She participated in the multinational exercise Operation "RIMPAC 82" and served as a training platform for both prospective commanding officers and midshipmen. Early in July 1982, she embarked upon a five-week cruise that took her to the California coast and back, during which she participated in antisubmarine exercises and in the fleet exercise FLEETEX 1–82. Aspro returned to Pearl Harbor on 12 August 1982 and began preparations for a cold-weather deployment.

On 15 October 1982, Aspro and one of her sister ships, the attack submarine USS Tautog (SSN-639), got underway for the Arctic. In addition to cold-weather drills, the two submarines gathered scientific data. They also made a winter rendezvous at the North Pole on 20 November 1982, celebrated by the mailing of cachet envelopes prepared especially for the occasion. Aspro returned to Pearl Harbor on 15 December 1982 and began a period of stand-down and upkeep.

=== 1983–1984 ===
In February 1983, Aspro resumed duty in the Hawaiian operating area, which continued through May. In June 1983, Aspro began preparations for her sixth tour of duty with the Seventh Fleet in the Western Pacific.

Aspro departed Pearl Harbor in July 1983 for the deployment, which was highlighted by visits to many of the exotic ports of East Asia and successful completion of all assigned missions. She returned to Pearl Harbor on 23 October 1983 and, after the post-deployment stand-down, took up local operations. That duty continued into the beginning of 1984.

On 16 January 1984, Aspro entered the medium auxiliary floating drydock USS Competent (AFDM-6) for a restricted availability for repairs and alterations. Later, she resumed operations at sea.

On 24 July 1984, Aspro began her seventh deployment to the Western Pacific. Operating both in the Pacific and Indian Oceans, Aspro carried her assignments to successful conclusions and made a number of port calls.

=== 1985–1986 ===
Aspro returned to Pearl Harbor from her deployment in January 1985 and, following the usual leave and upkeep period, embarked upon local operations in the Hawaiian Islands once more. In April 1985, she visited the United States West Coast again. That summer, she voyaged to the Arctic for more cold-weather drills. She returned to Hawaii at the end of September and resumed local operations in October, which she continued through April 1986.

In May 1986, Aspro headed north for another round of cold-weather exercises in the Arctic. She returned to Pearl Harbor on 11 July 1986 and remained in the Hawaiian Islands until early September 1986, when she cruised to the Northern Pacific Ocean. Aspro concluded that voyage on 27 October 1986 at the Mare Island Naval Shipyard at Vallejo, California, where she began a regular overhaul on 15 November 1986.

=== 1987–1994 ===
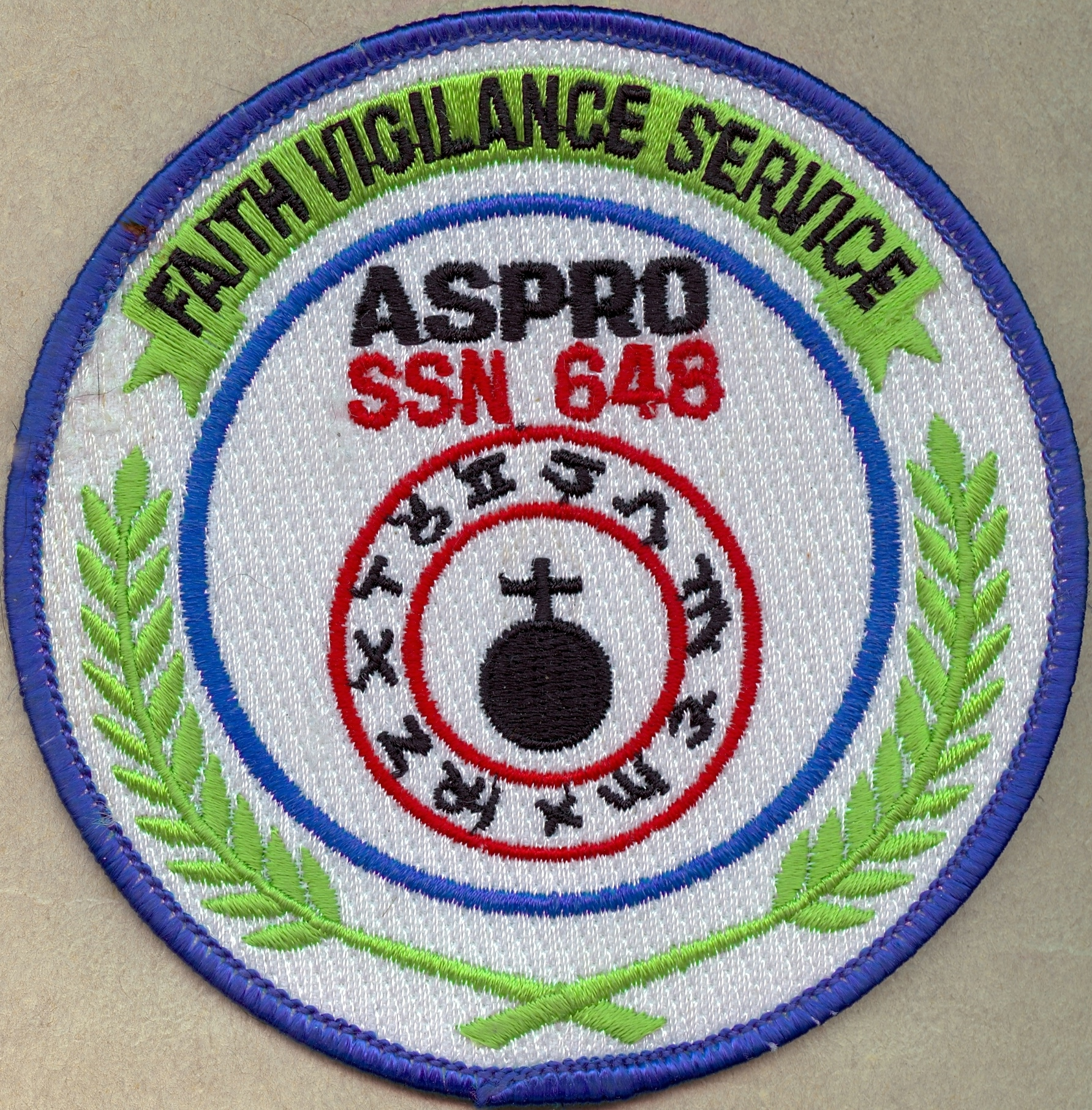
USS Aspro's patch from around 1993.

Aspro spent a significantly longer time at Mare Island Naval Shipyard than originally scheduled. During her overhaul, new sonar and fire-control system technologies became available and were installed during the delay. The delay also allowed Aspro to have anechoic (acoustic) tiling installed on her hull, making her one of the quietest attack submarines in the United States Pacific Fleet.

At the conclusion of her overhaul, Aspro and her crew scored an EXCELLENT on the Post-Overhaul Reactor Safeguards Examination, (PORSE) which few nuclear warships have attained. She then followed this achievement with extremely positive performances on Tactical Readiness Examinations against much newer ships.

Aspro returned to Pearl Harbor in October 1989. As she rounded the bend into the submarine base, the other moored submarines, led by her sister ship USS Tautog (SSN-639), sounded their whistles for over four minutes, welcoming Aspro back to her home port.

After her return, Aspro deployed twice to the Western Pacific and twice to the Northern Pacific. She won the Battle Efficiency Award (Battle "E") for Submarine Squadron 1 three times in the next four years, twice under CDR J. A. "Andy" Borchardt and once under CDR J. M. "Mike" Willy. ASPRO was awarded the Meritorious Unit Commendation for performance during a period in 1994 while deployed to the Western Pacific. During her final WESTPAC cruise, she made port calls in Hong Kong, Guam, Sasebo Japan, and New Caledonia, with CDR Willy in command. USS ASPRO had her decommissioning ceremony at Naval Base Pearl Harbor in early 1995 upon return from her final cruise, and completed the formal decommissioning process at Pearl Harbor Naval Shipyard in 1995, with CDR Keith Sauls in command for the decommissioning process.

== Decommissioning and disposal ==
Aspro was formally decommissioned on 31 March 1995 and stricken from the Naval Vessel Register the same day, although her decommissioning ceremony was not held until 2 April 1995. Her scrapping via the Nuclear-Powered Ship and Submarine Recycling Program at Puget Sound Naval Shipyard at Bremerton began on 1 October 1999 and was completed on 3 November 2000.
