= Japanese netlayer Kanko Maru =

History

Empire of Japan
- Name: Kanko Maru (漢江丸)
- Builder: Nakata Shipyard
- Laid down: 1940
- Launched: 26 December 1940
- Sponsored by: Sanko Kisen Co., Ltd.
- Completed: 1 May 1941
- Acquired: Requisitioned by Imperial Japanese Navy, 4 December 1941
- Commissioned: 20 December 1941
- Homeport: Amagasaki
- Identification: 47973
- Fate: Torpedoed and sunk, 5 January 1945
- Notes: Call sign: JBLP

General characteristics
- Class & type: Steamer
- Tonnage: 909 GRT
- Length: 56.9 m (186 ft 8 in) o/a
- Beam: 9.4 m (30 ft 10 in)
- Draught: 5.1 m (16 ft 9 in)
- Propulsion: 1 diesel engine, single shaft, 1 screw
- Armament: 1 x 8 cm/40 3rd Year Type naval gun 1 x Type 93 13 mm AT/AA machine gun 1 x Lewis gun 24 depth charges 4 x Type 14 capture nets 1 x hanging hydrophone

Kanko Maru (Japanese: 漢江丸) was a steel-hulled steamer that was converted into an auxiliary net layer by the Imperial Japanese Navy during World War II.

== History ==
She was launched on 26 December 1940 at the Nakata Shipyard (中田造船所) for the benefit of Sanko Kisen K.K. (jp:三光汽船) and completed on 1 May 1941. On 4 December 1941, she was requisitioned by the Imperial Japanese Navy, commissioned on 20 December 1941 into the Sasebo Guard Force, Sasebo Naval District, and then sent to the shipyard of Tochigi Shoji K.K. for conversion into an auxiliary net layer. On 31 December 1941, she was reassigned to the Chinkai Guard District. On 5 November 1942, her net-laying equipment was removed and she was converted into a cargo/transport ship although she retained her mine-sweeping equipment. On 10 November 1942, she was reassigned to the Southern Expeditionary Fleet.

On 5 January 1945, the US submarine Cavalla torpedoed and sank Kanko Maru and her fellow auxiliary net layer Shunsen Maru in the Java Sea 44 nautical miles north north west of Bawean Island, Netherlands East Indies at coordinates 05°00′S 112°20′E.
