= USS Carp (SS-338) =

Submarine of the United States

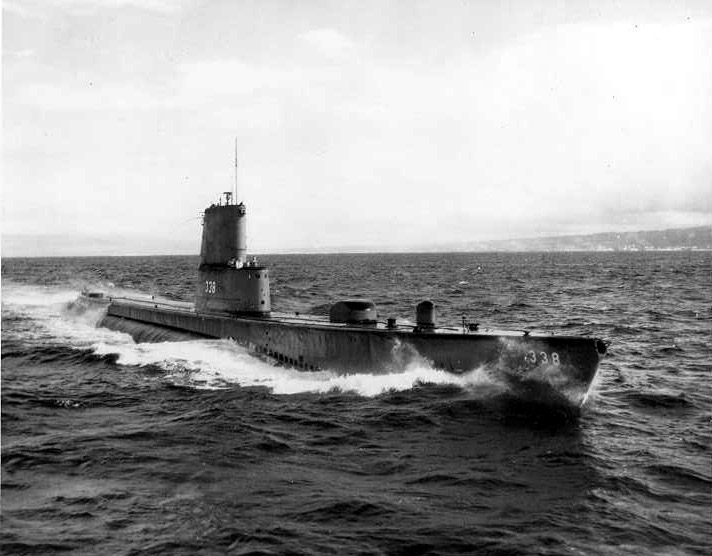
- Carp underway, c. 1960s.

History

United States
- Builder: Electric Boat Company, Groton, Connecticut
- Laid down: 23 December 1943
- Launched: 12 November 1944
- Commissioned: 28 February 1945
- Decommissioned: 18 March 1968
- Stricken: 20 December 1971
- Fate: Sold for scrap, 26 July 1973

General characteristics
- Class & type: Balao class diesel-electric submarine
- Displacement: 1,526 tons (1,550 t) surfaced; 2,424 tons (2,463 t) submerged
- Length: 311 ft 9 in (95.02 m)
- Beam: 27 ft 3 in (8.31 m)
- Draft: 16 ft 10 in (5.13 m) maximum
- Propulsion: 4 × General Motors Model 16-278A V16 diesel engines driving electrical generators; 2 × 126-cell Sargo batteries; 4 × high-speed General Electric electric motors with reduction gears; 2 × propellers; 5,400 shp (4.0 MW) surfaced; 2,740 shp (2.0 MW) submerged
- Speed: 20.25 knots (38 km/h) surfaced; 8.75 knots (16 km/h) submerged
- Range: 11,000 nautical miles (20,000 km) surfaced at 10 knots (19 km/h)
- Endurance: 48 hours at 2 knots (3.7 km/h) submerged; 75 days on patrol
- Test depth: 400 ft (120 m)
- Complement: 10 officers, 70–71 enlisted
- Armament: 2 5”/25 wet mount deck guns

USS Carp (SS/AGSS/IXSS-338), a Balao-class submarine, was the second ship of the United States Navy to be named for the carp.

== Construction and active service ==
Carp (SS-338) was launched 12 November 1944 by Electric Boat Company, Groton, Connecticut; sponsored by Mrs. W. E. Hess; and commissioned 28 February 1945.

Carp departed New London 14 April 1945, conducted training at Balboa, Panama, and arrived at Pearl Harbor 21 May. On her first and only war patrol (8 June – 7 August), Carp cruised off the coast of Honshū, destroying small craft and patrolling for the carriers of the 3rd Fleet engaged in air strikes on the mainland. Undergoing refit at Midway when hostilities ended, Carp returned to Seattle 22 September.

Carp received one battle star for her service in World War II. Her single war patrol was designated as "successful".

Based in San Diego as flagship for Submarine Division 71, Carp operated along the West Coast with occasional training cruises to Pearl Harbor. Between 13 February and 15 June 1947 she made a simulated war patrol to the Far East, and in 1948 and 1949 Carp made two exploratory cruises to extreme northern waters, adding to the knowledge of an increasingly important strategic area for submarine operations.

Converted to a Fleet Snorkel-type submarine in February 1952, which added to her submerged speed and endurance, Carp supported United Nations' forces in the Korean War during her cruise of 22 September 1952–April 1953 to the Far East. Arriving at Pearl Harbor, her new home port 15 March 1954, Carp remained on active duty with the fleet from that port through July 1959. During this time she continued to make cruises to the Far East, one of which included a good-will visit to Australia and participation in a Southeast Asia Treaty Organization exercise, and to Alaskan waters.

On 1 August 1959 Carp departed Pearl Harbor for her new assignment with the Atlantic Fleet. Arriving at Naval Station Norfolk in Norfolk, Virginia, 28 August 1959, the submarine conducted type exercises and training off the United States East Coast and in the Caribbean Sea through 1967.

== Auxiliary and training service ==
Carp was redesignated an Auxiliary Submarine, AGSS-338, in 1968, and Miscellaneous Submarine IXSS-338 in 1971.

Around 1971, Carp was moored at South Boston Naval Annex, across the harbor from Logan International Airport at about the point where Interstate 90 now crosses. She was used for training. Her battery room was converted into a television lounge, and her rudder was welded in place; otherwise, Carp seemed fully operational to trainees.

== Fate ==
Carp was struck from the Naval Vessel Register on 20 December 1971 and sold for scrapping in 1973. Her conning tower has been preserved at Seawolf Park on Pelican Island just north of Galveston, Texas.

== Awards ==
- Combat Action Ribbon
- Asiatic-Pacific Campaign Medal with one battle star for World War II service
- World War II Victory Medal
- Navy Occupation Service Medal with "ASIA" clasp
- China Service Medal
- National Defense Service Medal with star
- Korean Service Medal
- Republic of Korea Presidential Unit Citation (Republic of Korea)
- United Nations Korea Medal (United Nations)
- Korean War Service Medal (Republic of Korea)
