= USS Competent (AFDM-6) =

AFDM-3-class dry dock of the United States Navy

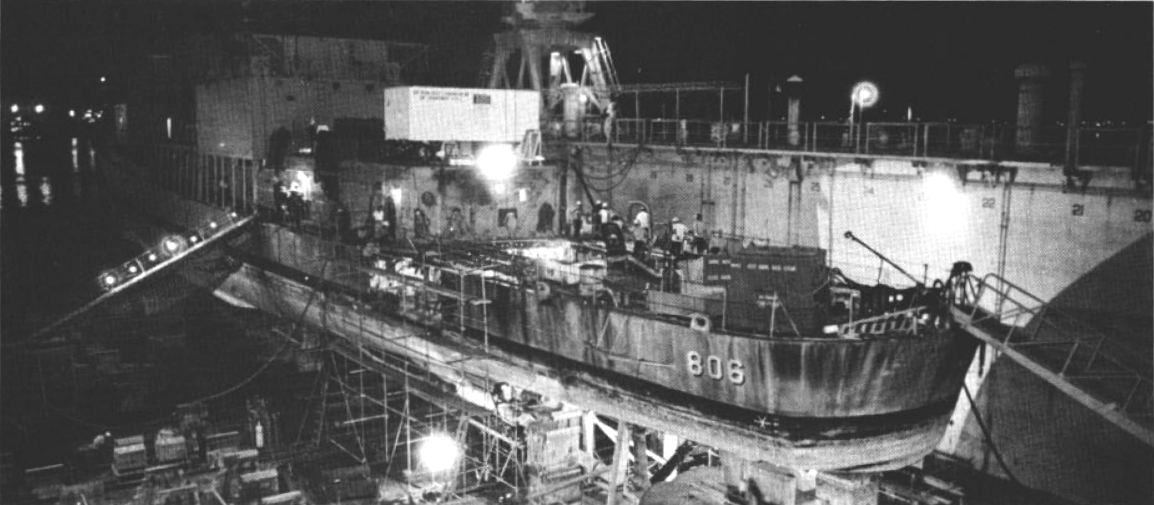
- USS AFDM-6 and USS Higbee

History

United States
- Name: Competent
- Namesake: Competent
- Builder: Everett Pacific Shipbuilding Co.
- Acquired: 1 June 1944
- Commissioned: June 1944
- Decommissioned: August 1997
- Reclassified: AFDM-6, 1945
- Stricken: 21 August 1997
- Home port: Pearl Harbor
- Identification: Callsign: NBHD; Hull number: YFD-62
- Honors and awards: See Awards
- Fate: Transferred to PT Arpeni Pratama
- Status: Operational in Batam, Riau Islands

General characteristics
- Class & type: AFDM-3-class floating drydock
- Displacement: 8,000 t (7,874 long tons)
- Length: 552 ft 10 in (168.50 m)
- Beam: 124 ft 0 in (37.80 m)
- Draft: 7–15 ft (2.1–4.6 m)
- Complement: 4 officers, 146 enlisted

USS Competent (AFDM-6), (former YFD-62), was an AFDM-3-class floating dry dock built in 1943 and operated by the United States Navy.

== Construction and career ==
YFD-62 Auxiliary floating drydock was built at the Everett Pacific Shipbuilding Shipyard, in Everett, Washington in 1944. She was commissioned in June 1944.

In 1945, the dry dock was re-designated as AFDM-6.

In 1968, USS Wandank (ATA-204) performed island survey duties in the Western Carolinas and subsequently helped to search for AFDM-6 which had broken loose from her civilian tow vessel.

USS Carpenter (DD-825) while steaming towards Subic Bay that day, the crew discovered several leaks in the ship's hull. Moving immediately into dry dock AFDM-6 at Subic Bay, the rusted plating was repaired by work crews and Carpenter returned to Yankee Station on 5 November 1971. In 1972, USS Higbee (DDR-806) was dry docked after being the first ship to be bombed during the Vietnam War. From 14 to 22 August 1975, USS Bronstein (FF-1037) returned to Subic Bay to have a hole in her shaft repaired while on the blocks in AFDM-6. In 1979, she as given the name Competent.

On 16 February 1981, USS Barbel (SS-580) moved into Competent at Pearl Harbor for a two-week drydock period. On 16 January 1984, USS Aspro (SSN-648) entered the floating drydock Competent for a restricted availability. USS Los Angeles (SSN-688) was dry docked from 9 May until 1 July 1986. From 20 May until 24 June 1987, the USS Bremerton (SSN-698) underwent dry docking inside Competent. On 1 March 1988, Los Angeles was again dry docked for Selected Restricted Availability and undocked on 11 May.

Bremerton started the year 1995 in drydock aboard Competent. She was decommissioned in August 1997 and later stricken from the Naval Register on 21 August. The dry dock was donated to a private company to be used in Kalaeloa. LAter sold to PT Arpeni Pratama Ocean Line to be operated in Batam, Indonesia.

== Awards ==
- American Campaign Medal
- Asiatic-Pacific Campaign Medal
- World War II Victory Medal
- National Defense Service Medal
- Navy Meritorious Unit Commendation
- Navy Battle "E" Ribbon (6 awards)
