= USS Tautog (SSN-639) =

Submarine of the United States

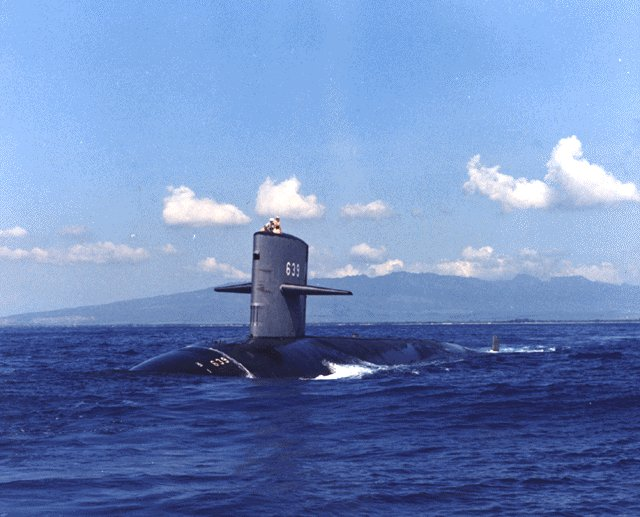
- USS Tautog (SSN-639) off the Hawaiian Islands

History

United States
- Name: USS Tautog
- Namesake: The tautog, a type of wrasse.
- Ordered: 30 November 1961
- Builder: Ingalls Shipbuilding, Pascagoula, Mississippi
- Laid down: 27 January 1964
- Launched: 15 April 1967
- Sponsored by: Pauline Lafon Gore
- Commissioned: 17 August 1968
- Decommissioned: 31 March 1997
- Stricken: 31 March 1997
- Identification: Hull number: SSN-639
- Motto: Silent Vigilance
- Nickname(s): "The Terrible T"
- Fate: Scrapping via Ship and Submarine Recycling Program completed 30 November 2004
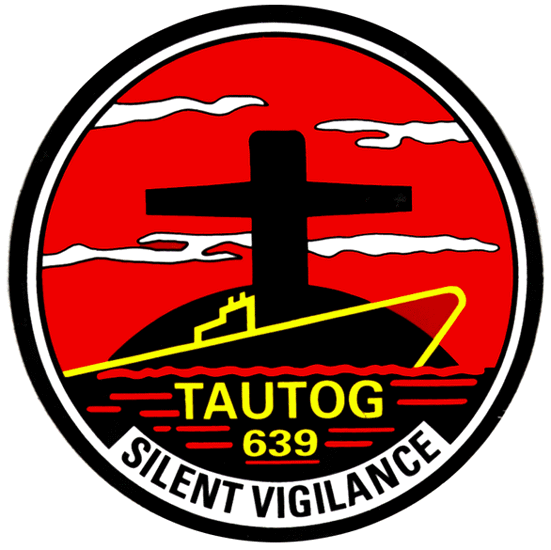
- Badge

General characteristics
- Class & type: Sturgeon-class attack submarine
- Displacement: 4010 tons (light); 4309 tons (full); 299 tons (dead)
- Length: 89 m (292 ft)
- Beam: 9.7 m (32 ft)
- Draft: 8.8 m (29 ft)
- Propulsion: S5W nuclear reactor
- Speed: >20kt
- Test depth: >400ft
- Complement: 14 officers; 95 men

USS Tautog (SSN-639), a Sturgeon-class attack submarine, was the second ship of the United States Navy to be named for the tautog (Tautoga onitis), a wrasse commonly found along the Northern Atlantic coast. The submarine was in service from 17 August 1968 to 31 March 1997.

== Construction and commissioning ==
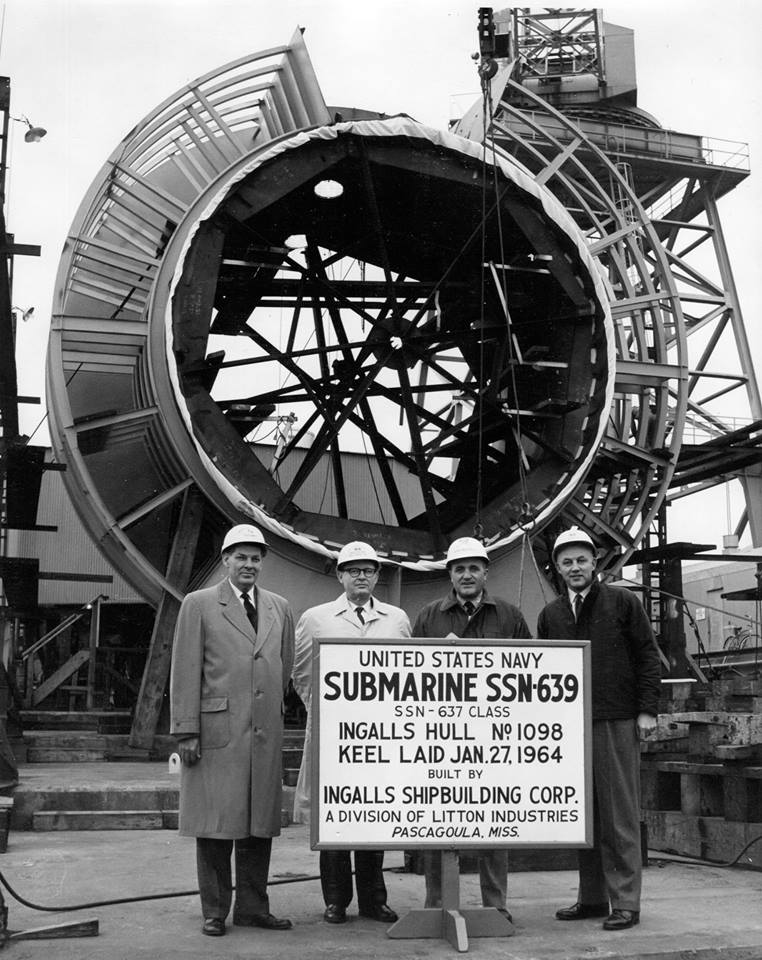
SSN-639 New Construction

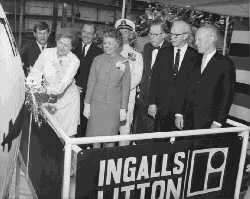
Tautog commissioning

The contract to build Tautog was awarded to Ingalls Shipbuilding in Pascagoula, Mississippi, on 30 November 1961 and her keel was laid down there on 27 January 1964. She was commissioned on 15 March 1967, sponsored by Pauline Lafon Gore, wife of United States Senator Albert Gore, Sr. (1907–1998) of Tennessee. Under sunny skies, a crowd of thousands watched as Mrs. Gore took a hearty swing with a bottle of champagne and intoned the memorial words, "In the name of the United States of America, I christen thee Tautog." Tautog was commissioned 17 August 1968 under the command of Commander Buele G. Balderston.

== Service history ==
=== 1968–1970 ===
On 30 August 1968, Tautog departed Pascagoula on her way to join the United States Pacific Fleet. She transited the Panama Canal on 8 September 1968 and arrived at Pearl Harbor, Hawaii, on 23 September 1968. There, she joined Submarine Squadron 12, serving as its flagship. Throughout 1969, Tautog completed her post-commissioning tests and sea trials, followed by her shakedown training cruise. She conducted the majority of these operations in the vicinity of the Hawaiian Islands, although in January and February 1969, she berthed in Puget Sound Naval Shipyard at Bremerton, Washington, for trials and repairs. She completed her shakedown training in September 1969, and on 15 September 1969, began post-shakedown repairs and alterations, which were protracted by the necessity of replacing her entire diesel generator. Tautog's repairs finally were completed on 19 February 1970, and she began normal operations out of Pearl Harbor, involving torpedo and sonar tracking exercises, culminating in Tautog earning the Battle Efficiency "E" in 1970 for outstanding performance. Tautog received a Navy Unit Commendation for service on or about 1 June 1969. According to Drew, 2008, Tautog monitored a test of new cruise missiles launched from a Soviet Echo II-class submarine in the summer of 1969.

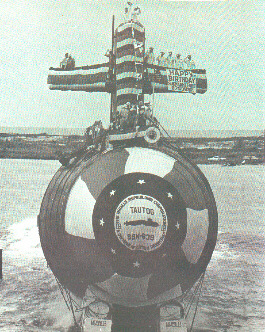
Tautog launch

Tautog sailed with the Seventh Fleet (Western Pacific, or WESTPAC) in 1970, making port calls in the Philippines, Hong Kong, Okinawa, Japan, and Korea. Upon return to Pearl Harbor, Tautog was presented the Meritorious Unit Commendation for operations conducted during that deployment, 1 October 1970 to 1 April 1971.

=== Collision with K-108, 1970 ===
On 20 June 1970, Tautog was patrolling the North Pacific Ocean near the city of Petropavlovsk-Kamchatsky, on the Soviet Union's Kamchatka Peninsula, which was a major base for missile-armed submarines of the Soviet Navy. Tautog was attempting to trail the K-108, a Soviet Navy Echo II-class guided-missile submarine nicknamed "Black Lila". The Soviet submarine was "close aboard" with Tautog, unaware that Tautog was in the vicinity, and the two submarines were within feet of one another for a lengthy period. Unable to determine the depth of K-108, as new depth-finding hydrophones had not yet been installed, the American submarine was at a disadvantage in such close quarters. At some points, the hydrographic equipment aboard Tautog registered zero distance between the submarines. At another point, Tautog's hydrophone operators assumed K-108 had risen to near the surface, placing the Soviet submarine directly above Tautog. Then, the operators determined the Soviet vessel was descending. The trace on the oscilloscope that gave the American submariners at visual reference as to the distance of K-108 disappeared. Just as the captain began to say the Soviet sub was coming close aboard again, K-108 slammed belly first into the top of Tautog's sail, proof the Soviet vessel had been descending from directly above. The K-108's massive screws came into contact with the steel of Tautog's sail and lost one screw. This was confirmed by hydrographic sound of a turbine running away aboard the Soviet sub, being no longer coupled to a propeller. Tautog suffered damage to her sail. As Tautog proceeded away from the site of the incident, her crew heard what they believed was K-108 breaking up and sinking. When Tautog arrived in Pearl Harbor, a large portion of one of K-108's screws was found embedded in her sail. Over 20 years later, after the collapse of the Soviet Union, K-108 was revealed to have actually been able to return to Petropavlovsk-Kamchatsky. The former captain of K-108, Boris Bogdasaryan, was able to provide a concise narrative of the collision, which resulted in no casualties aboard either submarine.

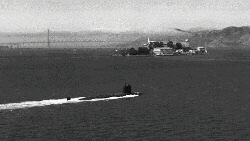
Tautog sailing into San Francisco

Though the occurrence of this event was adamantly denied by the United States and the Soviet Union, Tautog's sail was permanently bent at a 2° angle, which made dry-docking problematic.

In 1991, the Chicago Tribune broke the story about the collision. The Discovery Channel mentioned it in their TV program Sharks of Steel, and the full details were finally made public in 1999 in the book Blind Man's Bluff: The Untold Story Of American Submarine Espionage.

=== 1970–1977 ===
On 9 October 1970, Tautog departed Pearl Harbor for her first East Asian deployment. She arrived on station at Buckner Bay, Okinawa, on 23 October 1970 and joined the United States Seventh Fleet. During her tour of duty in the Western Pacific, she was completely engaged in antisubmarine warfare training, usually with units of the Seventh Fleet, but on one occasion, in a joint operation with the British Royal Navy frigate HMS Aurora (F10). She spent time in port for liberty and repairs at such places as U.S. Naval Base Subic Bay in the Philippines; Hong Kong; Yokosuka, Japan; and the South Korean port of Pusan. She concluded her first tour of duty in the Western Pacific on 28 March 1971, when she departed Yokosuka bound for Hawaii. She arrived at Pearl Harbor on 5 April 1971 and resumed her routine of upkeep in port alternated with periods at sea engaged in antisubmarine warfare training for the remainder of 1971 and during the first three months of 1972.

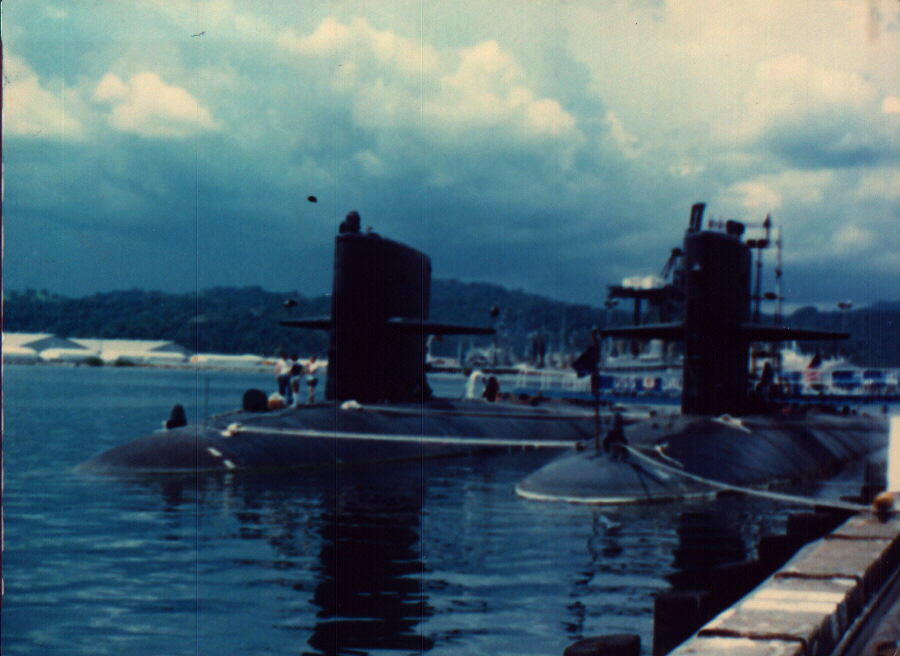
Tautog in Subic Bay, Philippines

On 21 March 1972, Tautog put to sea for a special operation. During that mission, she called briefly at Guam and at Subic Bay. At the conclusion of the assignment, Tautog earned the Navy Unit Commendation for operations conducted during that deployment, 1 June 1972. Tautog made a liberty visit to Hong Kong before returning via Guam to Pearl Harbor, where she arrived on 31 August 1972. She conducted operations in the Hawaiian Islands for the remainder of 1972.

On 15 January 1973, Tautog entered the Pearl Harbor Naval Shipyard for her first regular overhaul. It was completed on 15 April 1974, when she resumed local operations out of Pearl Harbor which – except for a voyage to the Pacific Northwest which lasted from late July to early September 1974 – occupied her time until the beginning of May 1975.

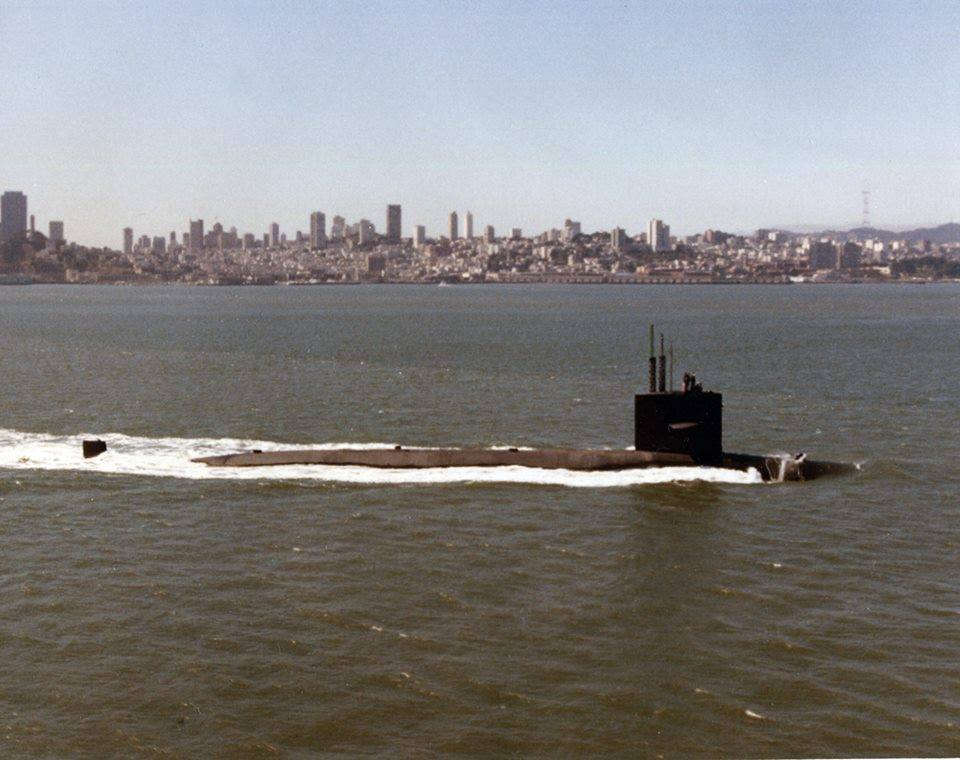
USS Tautog off San Francisco, 1974

On 3 May 1975, she departed Pearl Harbor for another series of special operations in the Central and Western Pacific. That voyage included a period in drydock at Guam during the first week in June 1975, and exercises in the Philippines near Subic Bay. Ports of call once again included Subic Bay and Hong Kong, but no South Korean or Japanese ports. Tautog returned to Pearl Harbor on 18 October 1975 and resumed her schedule of training and upkeep. The officers and crew were awarded the Navy Expeditionary Medal for the successful completion of their assigned mission.

=== 1977–1980 ===
Attack submarine training, independent ship's exercises, inspections, and evaluations, all conducted in the Hawaiian Islands operating area, consumed Tautog's energies through the end of 1976. She did not deploy overseas again until the beginning of 1977, when she got underway for a goodwill visit to Mombasa, Kenya. Departing Pearl Harbor on 3 January 1977, she reached Mombasa on 24 January 1977 and remained there for a month while her crew saw the sights and she received visitors on board.

==== Uganda crisis, 1977 ====
Tautog departed Mombasa on 24 February 1977 and started east toward Pearl Harbor. On the way, however, President of Uganda Idi Amin had precipitated a crisis by rounding up all Americans resident in Uganda in response to President of the United States Jimmy Carter's condemnation of the murders of two of Amin's Ugandan political opponents, and Tautog received orders to join a hastily organized task force built around the nuclear-powered aircraft carrier USS Enterprise (CVN-65) and return to the East African coast. While the United States waited for Amin to make his mind up about whether or not to release the American hostages, Tautog cruised the coast of Kenya, which stands between landlocked Uganda and the Indian Ocean, with the Enterprise task force both as a show of American resolve to protect U.S. citizens in Uganda and as a scratch force to try for a hostage rescue if one became necessary. Tautog received a Meritorious Unit Commendation for service 1 November 1976 to 5 July 1977.

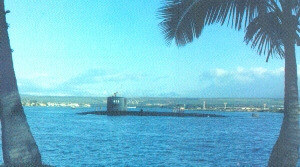
Tautog sailing into Pearl Harbor

Amin eventually freed the hostages, and Tautog was released from the special task force and resumed her voyage east, arriving at Guam on 19 March 1977. Tautog visited Chinhae, South Korea, in April, and on 20 April 1977, arrived in Subic Bay for a series of special operations in the Philippines.

Early in May 1977, Tautog made a liberty call at Hong Kong and then returned to Subic Bay on the 18 May. Special operations occupied her time in late May and June. On 3 July 1977, she arrived back at Pearl Harbor and upon return, preparations were made for the transit to Vallejo, California, where Tautog would undergo its second major overhaul and receive a new reactor core. In December 1977, she entered Mare Island Naval Shipyard and the overhaul commenced.

Following completion of the stand down on 8 August 1977, Tautog conducted local operations in the Hawaiian area until she departed Pearl Harbor on 2 December 1977 to proceed to the Mare Island Naval Shipyard at Vallejo, California, for an overhaul. This overhaul, which included the refueling of her nuclear core, lasted nearly 15 months, after which Tautog successfully completed her sea trials and sailed to Pearl Harbor to rejoin the submarine force arriving in July 1979.

=== 1980–1997 ===
Following a period of training and operational exercises, Tautog again deployed on WESTPAC in March 1980. Tautog met every commitment placed on her during this period of international tension, and was awarded the Navy Expeditionary Medal for her performance. In September 1980, the ship was awarded the Battle Efficiency "E", Antisubmarine Warfare "A" and Engineering "E" for excellence displayed during the previous year. Port visits were made to Diego Garcia; the Philippines; Perth, Australia; and Guam. Tautog also received a Meritorious Unit Commendation for service on or around 1 June 1980.

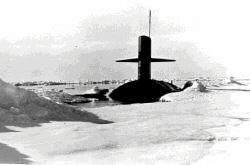
Tautog surfaced in Arctic

In 1981, the ship and crew were rested and ready to go. After a training cycle, Tautog sailed west once more in support of the Seventh Fleet in the Pacific and Indian Oceans. She became the first nuclear submarine to transit the Malacca Straits; she surfaced and visited Singapore, the Philippines, Australia, Diego Garcia, and Japan. Later in 1982, Tautog earned her third consecutive Engineering "E" and a Damage Control "DC" for excellence in engineering and damage control.

In winter 1982, Tautog joined one of her sister ships, USS Aspro, and journeyed to the frozen reaches of the Arctic. She operated beneath the ice pack for two months and conducted a dual surfacing maneuver at the North Pole with USS Aspro. It was reportedly the second rendezvous by two U.S. submarines at the pole and the first during winter.

During summer 1983, Tautog once again found herself operating under the Arctic ice pack. To celebrate her arrival at the Pole, the crew had a picnic, a tug-of-war, and dog-sled races "around the world".

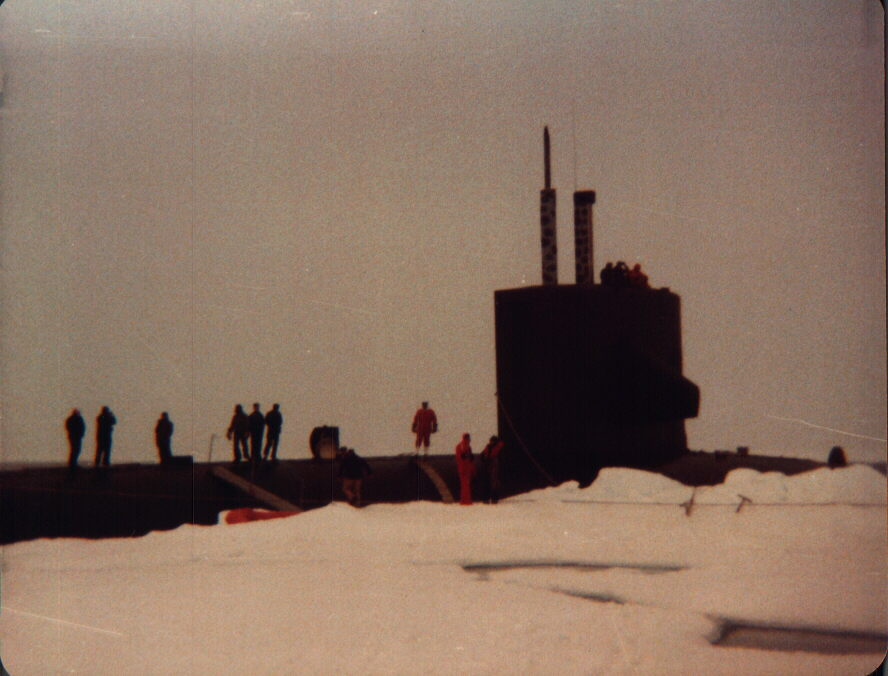
Tautog surfaced at North Pole

In 1984, following a two-month shipyard availability, Tautog entered an operational crew training period. In the spring of 1984, Tautog again journeyed west in support of Seventh Fleet operations. Tautog operated extensively in the Northern Pacific, making port visits to the Philippines, Thailand, and Japan. Again, she was awarded the Navy Expeditionary Medal. Tautog completed a Western Pacific deployment in November 1984 upon her return to Pearl Harbor. After completing a stand down and a post-deployment upkeep period, she hosted prospective commanding officer operations in February 1985 and spent a three-day liberty period at Lahaina, Hawaii, on Maui.

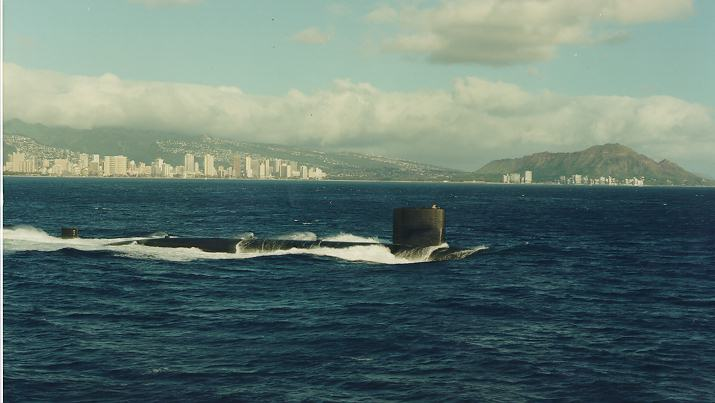
Tautog sailing in front of Diamond Head, Hawaii

In the summer of 1985, Tautog joined the attack submarine USS New York City in hosting prospective commanding officer operations. In October 1985, Tautog left Pearl Harbor for a Western Pacific and Indian Ocean deployment, visiting Guam; Singapore (for Christmas); Diego Garcia twice; Perth, Australia; the Philippines; and Chinhae, South Korea. On her return to Pearl Harbor, she picked up an operational reactor safeguard examination team.

Once back in Pearl Harbor in April 1986, Tautog had a change of command ceremony in which Commander Walter P. Stuermann relieved Commander T. R. Kent as commanding officer. In October 1986, Tautog began a nonrefueling overhaul at Puget Sound Naval Shipyard, Bremerton, Washington. After extensive modifications and testing, she returned to her homeport of Pearl Harbor, Hawaii, on 30 May 1989.

Tautog departed on her eighth Western Pacific deployment in May 1990, visiting Singapore, Hong Kong, Subic Bay (Philippines), and Yokosuka, Japan. The ship experienced a massive typhoon, which prevented her from entering Subic Bay for almost a week. Back in Pearl Harbor in November 1990, Tautog enjoyed the holidays and began preparing for her third Arctic deployment. In April 1991, Tautog once again joined her sister ship, Aspro, for three weeks of Arctic under-ice operations, ending in a liberty port in San Francisco. After the exercise, she performed an emergency main ballast tank blow from her test depth. In summer 1991, Tautog hosted the Japanese Maritime Self Defense Force (JMSDF) submarine Akishio on her mid-Pac cruise.

Torpedo explodes under Darter

In late January 1992, Tautog successfully fired a MK 48 Advanced Capability warshot torpedo and sank the target ship ex-Darter in the deep waters just south of Oahu. In summer 1992, Tautog set sail on a WESTPAC deployment, where she pulled back-to-back operations totaling about 150 days at sea of the roughly 180-day deployment.

In October 1993, Tautog was sent on an emergent WESTPAC with four days' notice. The ship and crew participated in a joint exercise with the JMSDF, then enjoyed a liberty port in Hong Kong. In February 1995, she departed Pearl Harbor for her 11th WESTPAC deployment, conducting joint operations with Japanese, Korean, and British naval forces. During this deployment, the crew was still able to enjoy such liberty ports as Guam, Hong Kong, Yokosuka (Japan), Sasebo (Japan), Okinawa (Japan), Chinhae (South Korea), and Subic Bay (Philippines). Tautog was awarded the Navy Expeditionary Medal for the highly completion of this successful cruise.

Misfortune arrived in February 1996 while the Tautog was conducting a personnel transfer in the mouth of Pearl Harbor. Unusual winds blowing from Maui caught the sail and Tautog drifted off course. While the officer of the deck was trying to reposition her, she ran into the west bank of the harbor. The damage was slight – cracking the sonar dome – but it was still a ship-grounding incident and a board of inquiry was launched to determine the root cause of the incident.

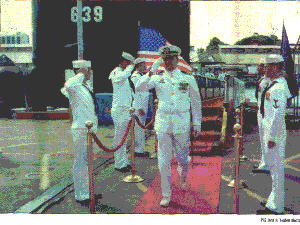
Tautog decommissioning

In July 1996, Tautog departed on her final deployment, this time to the eastern Pacific, supporting weapons testing and weeks of daily midshipman orientation cruises. Her liberty ports included San Diego and Esquimalt (British Columbia), with a repair stop in Bangor, Washington. Tautog made her 1,119th and last dive on 13 October 1996; her inactivation ceremony was held on 25 October 1996. After an inactivation period around 6 months, Tautog departed her lifelong homeport of Pearl Harbor for the final time, en route to Puget Sound Naval Shipyard for final disposition.

== Decommissioning and disposal ==
Tautog was decommissioned on 31 March 1997 and stricken from the Naval Vessel Register the same day. Her scrapping via the U.S. Navy's Nuclear-Powered Ship and Submarine Recycling Program at Puget Sound Naval Shipyard in Bremerton began on 15 March 2003 and was completed on 30 November 2004.

== Commemoration ==
Tautog's sail was preserved and is now on display at Galveston Naval Museum, in Seawolf Park in Galveston, Texas. It suffered damage when Hurricane Ike struck the area in 2008.

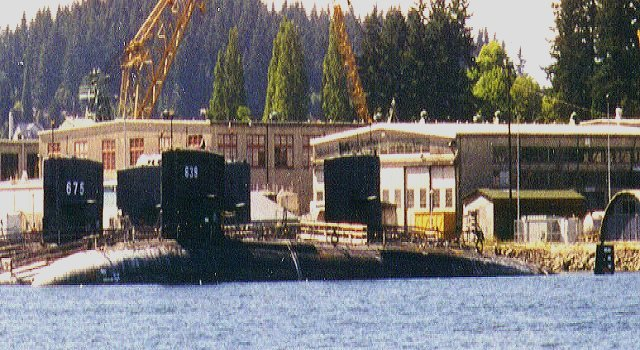
Ex-Tautog awaiting recycling in Bremerton

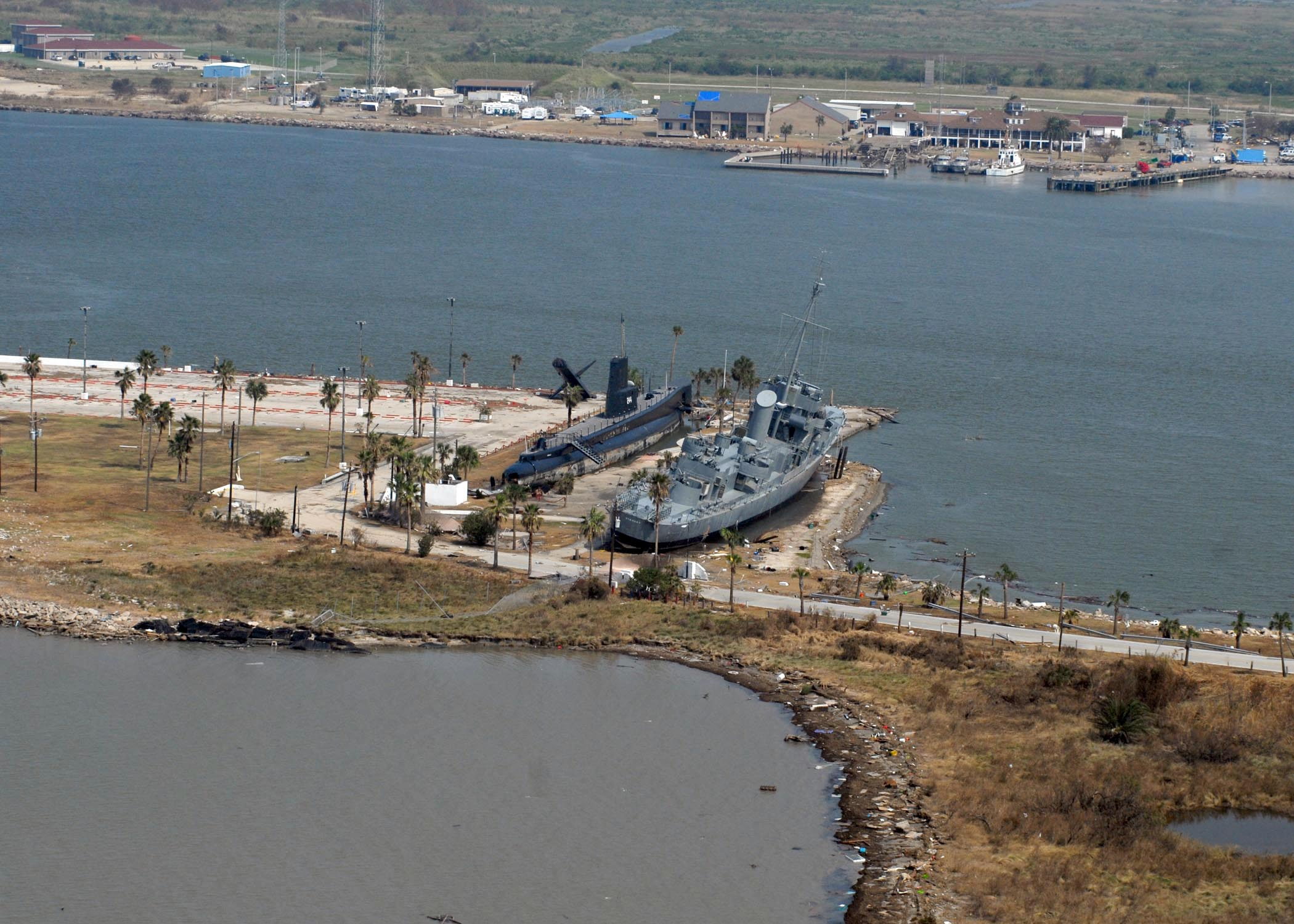
Tautog's preserved sail has tipped over in this view of damage at Galveston Naval Museum, in Seawolf Park

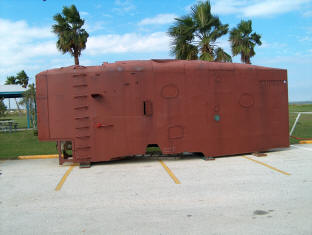
Tautog sail awaits preparation for the memorial
