= USS Cavalla (SS-244) =

Gato-class submarine known for sinking Shōkaku

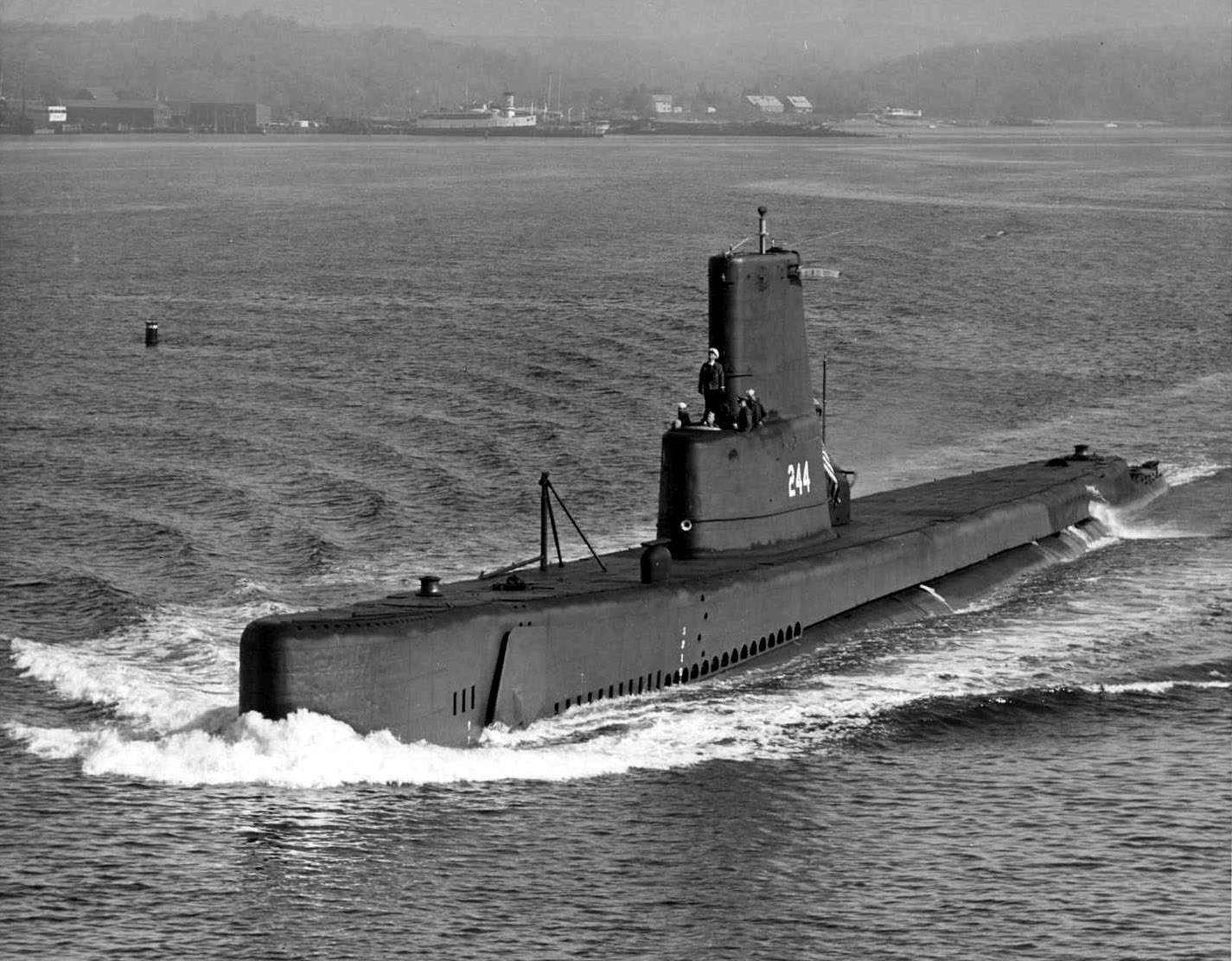
- Cavalla, possibly making her way to the International Naval Review in Norfolk, Va., 1957. She is in hunter-killer submarine (SSK) configuration, with a streamlined sail and large bow sonar housing for the BQR-4 sonar system.

History

United States
- Name: Cavalla
- Namesake: Cavalla
- Builder: Electric Boat Company, Groton, Connecticut
- Laid down: 4 March 1943
- Launched: 14 November 1943
- Sponsored by: Mrs. M. Comstock
- Commissioned: 29 February 1944
- Decommissioned: 16 March 1946
- Recommissioned: 10 April 1951
- Decommissioned: 3 September 1952
- Recommissioned: 15 July 1953
- Decommissioned: 3 June 1968
- Reclassified: SSK-244 on 18 February 1953; SS-244 on 15 August 1959; AGSS-244 on 1 July 1963
- Stricken: 30 December 1969
- Status: Museum ship at Galveston, Texas as of 21 January 1971
- Notes: Sank the Japanese carrier Shōkaku
- Badge

General characteristics
- Class & type: Gato-class diesel-electric submarine
- Displacement: 1,525 long tons (1,549 t) surfaced; 2,424 long tons (2,463 t) submerged
- Length: 311 ft 9 in (95.02 m)
- Beam: 27 ft 3 in (8.31 m)
- Draft: 17 ft (5.2 m) maximum
- Propulsion: 4 × General Motors Model 16-248 V16 Diesel engines driving electric generators; 2 × 126-cell Sargo batteries; 4 × high-speed General Electric electric motors with reduction gears; two propellers; 5,400 shp (4.0 MW) surfaced; 2,740 shp (2.0 MW) submerged
- Speed: 21 kn (24 mph) surfaced; 9 kn (10 mph) submerged
- Range: 11,000 nmi (20,000 km) surfaced at 10 kn (19 km/h)
- Endurance: 48 hours at 2 kn (4 km/h) submerged; 75 days on patrol
- Test depth: 300 ft (90 m)
- Complement: 6 officers, 54 enlisted
- Armament: 10 × 21-inch (533 mm) torpedo tubes; 6 forward, 4 aft; 24 torpedoes; 1 × 3-inch (76 mm) / 50 caliber deck gun; Bofors 40 mm and Oerlikon 20 mm cannon
- USS Cavalla (submarine)
- U.S. National Register of Historic Places
- Location within Texas Location within the United States
- Location: E. end of Seawolf Park, Galveston, Texas
- Coordinates: 29°20′08″N 94°46′42″W
- Area: 0.3 acres (0.12 ha)
- NRHP reference No.: 08000477
- Added to NRHP: 27 May 2008

USS Cavalla (SS/SSK/AGSS-244), a Gato-class submarine, is a submarine of the United States Navy named for a salt water fish, best known for sinking the Japanese aircraft carrier Shōkaku.

Her keel was laid down on 4 March 1943 by Electric Boat Co., Groton, Connecticut. She was launched on 14 November 1943 (sponsored by Mrs. M. Comstock), and commissioned on 29 February 1944, Lieutenant Commander (later Rear Admiral) Herman J. Kossler, USN, (class of 1934) in command.

== Operational history ==
Departing New London 11 April 1944, Cavalla arrived at Pearl Harbor 9 May, for voyage repairs and training. On 31 May 1944 the sub put to sea on active service for the first time.

=== First patrol ===
On her maiden patrol Cavalla, en route to her station in the eastern Philippines, made contact with a large Japanese task force on 17 June. Cavalla tracked the force for several hours, relaying information which contributed to the United States victory in the Battle of the Philippine Sea (commonly known as the "Marianas Turkey Shoot") on 19–20 June 1944. The submarine first reported sighting what appeared to be fifteen or more large combatant ships and then reported in more detail course and speed information having tracked the enemy force from underneath. On 19 June, she caught the carrier Shōkaku recovering planes, and quickly fired a spread of five torpedoes, with four hits. Shōkaku sank at 11°50′N 137°57′E. After a severe depth charging by three destroyers, Cavalla escaped to continue her patrol, having suffered relatively minor damage by depth charges from the Urakaze. The feat earned her a Presidential Unit Citation.

=== Second patrol ===
Cavalla's second patrol took her to the Philippine Sea as a member of a wolfpack operating in support of the invasion of Peleliu 15 September 1944.

=== Third patrol ===
On 25 November 1944, during her third patrol, Cavalla encountered two Japanese destroyers and made a surface attack which destroyed the Shimotsuki at 02°21′N 107°20′E. The companion destroyer began depth charge attacks, while Cavalla evaded on the surface. Later in the same patrol, on 5 January 1945 Cavalla made a night surface attack on an enemy convoy and sank two converted net tenders (Kanko Maru, Shunsen Maru) at 05°00′S 112°20′E.

=== Fourth and fifth patrols ===
Cavalla cruised the South China and Java Seas on her fourth and fifth war patrols. Targets were few and far between, but she came to the aid of an ally on 21 May 1945. A month out on her fifth patrol, the submarine sighted HMS Terrapin, damaged by enemy depth charges and unable to submerge or make full speed. Cavalla stood by the damaged submarine and escorted her on the surface to Fremantle, arriving 27 May 1945.

=== Sixth patrol ===
Cavalla received the cease-fire order of 15 August while lifeguarding off Japan on her sixth war patrol. A few minutes later she was bombed by a Japanese plane that apparently had not yet received the same information or heard the Gyokuon-hōsō radio broadcast. She joined the fleet units entering Tokyo Bay 31 August, remained for the signing of the surrender on 2 September, then departed the next day for New London, arriving 6 October 1945. She was placed out of commission in reserve there 16 March 1946.

=== Postwar ===
Recommissioned 10 April 1951, Cavalla was assigned to Submarine Squadron 8 and engaged in various fleet exercises in the Caribbean and off Nova Scotia. She was placed out of commission 3 September 1952 and entered Electric Boat Co. yard for conversion to a hunter-killer submarine (reclassified SSK-244, 18 February 1953). The SSK conversion included remodeling Cavalla's bow with the addition of a curved housing for a BQR-4 sonar system. The conversion included removal of two bow torpedo tubes, along with remodeling the original conning tower and bridge into the sail visible today.

Cavalla was recommissioned 15 July 1953 and assigned to Submarine Squadron 10. Her new sonar made Cavalla valuable for experimentation, and she was transferred to Submarine Development Group 2 on 1 January 1954, to evaluate new weapons and equipment, and to participate in fleet exercises. She also cruised to European waters several times to take part in NATO exercises, and visited Norfolk, Va., for the International Naval Review (11–12 June 1957). On 15 August 1959, her classification reverted to SS-244.

In November, 1961, Cavalla was ordered to Puerto Rico and provided electrical power via umbilical connection to USS Thresher (SSN-593) which had suffered a diesel generator failure while the nuclear reactor was shut down. Cavalla successfully assisted Thresher's restart of her reactor. Thresher was lost during post-overhaul sea trials on 10 April 1963 during a deep dive.

== Fate ==
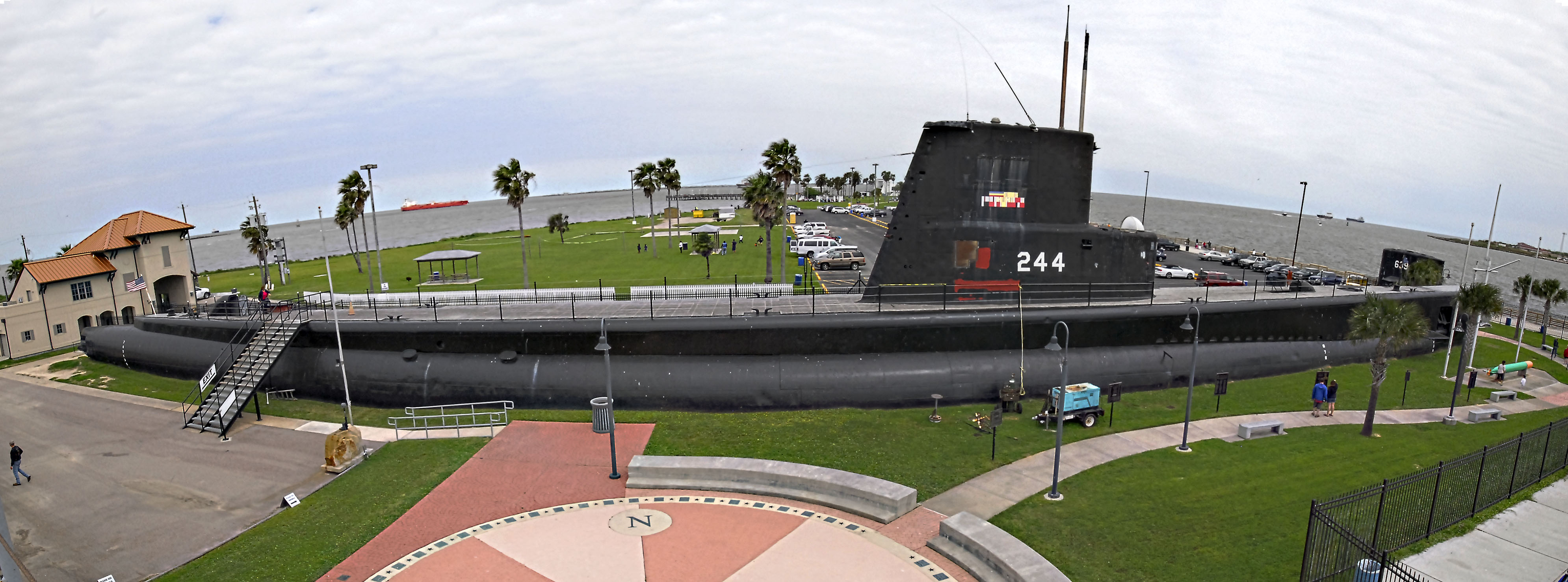
USS Cavalla (SS-244), at the Seawolf Park in Galveston, Texas.

Cavalla was reclassified an "auxiliary submarine", AGSS-244, in July 1963. Cavalla was decommissioned and struck from the Naval Register on 30 December 1969.

On 21 January 1971, Cavalla was transferred to the Texas Submarine Veterans of World War II. She now resides at Galveston Naval Museum in Seawolf Park on Pelican Island, just north of Galveston, Texas. Cavalla has undergone an extensive restoration process, and is open for self-guided tours. Among the early benefactors was then President of the Texas United States Submarine Veterans of World War II, Paul Francis Stolpman, and the former Texas secretary of state George Strake, Jr.

== Gallery ==
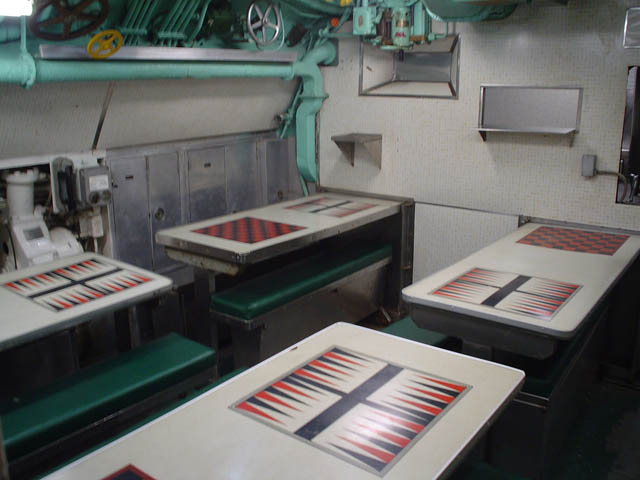
The mess of the restored USS Cavalla (SS-244)

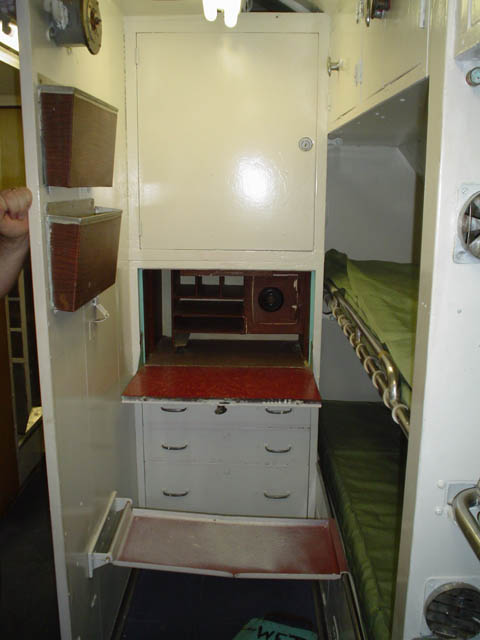
The cramped officer quarters of Cavalla

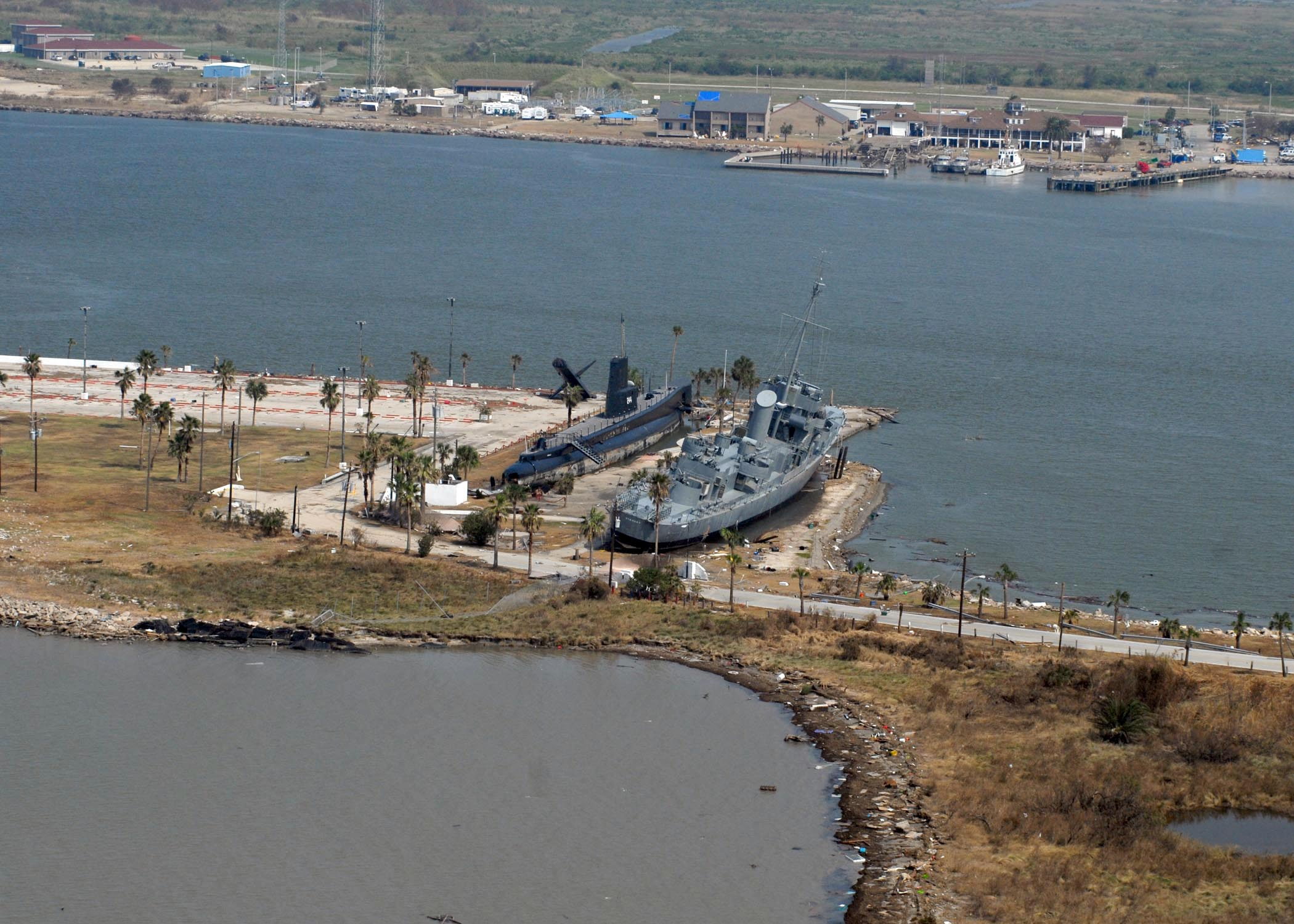
Damage in Seawolf Park following Hurricane Ike

== See also ==
- National Register of Historic Places listings in Galveston County, Texas
