= Victory Yard =

Coordinates: 41°20′36.08″N 72°4′50.8″W

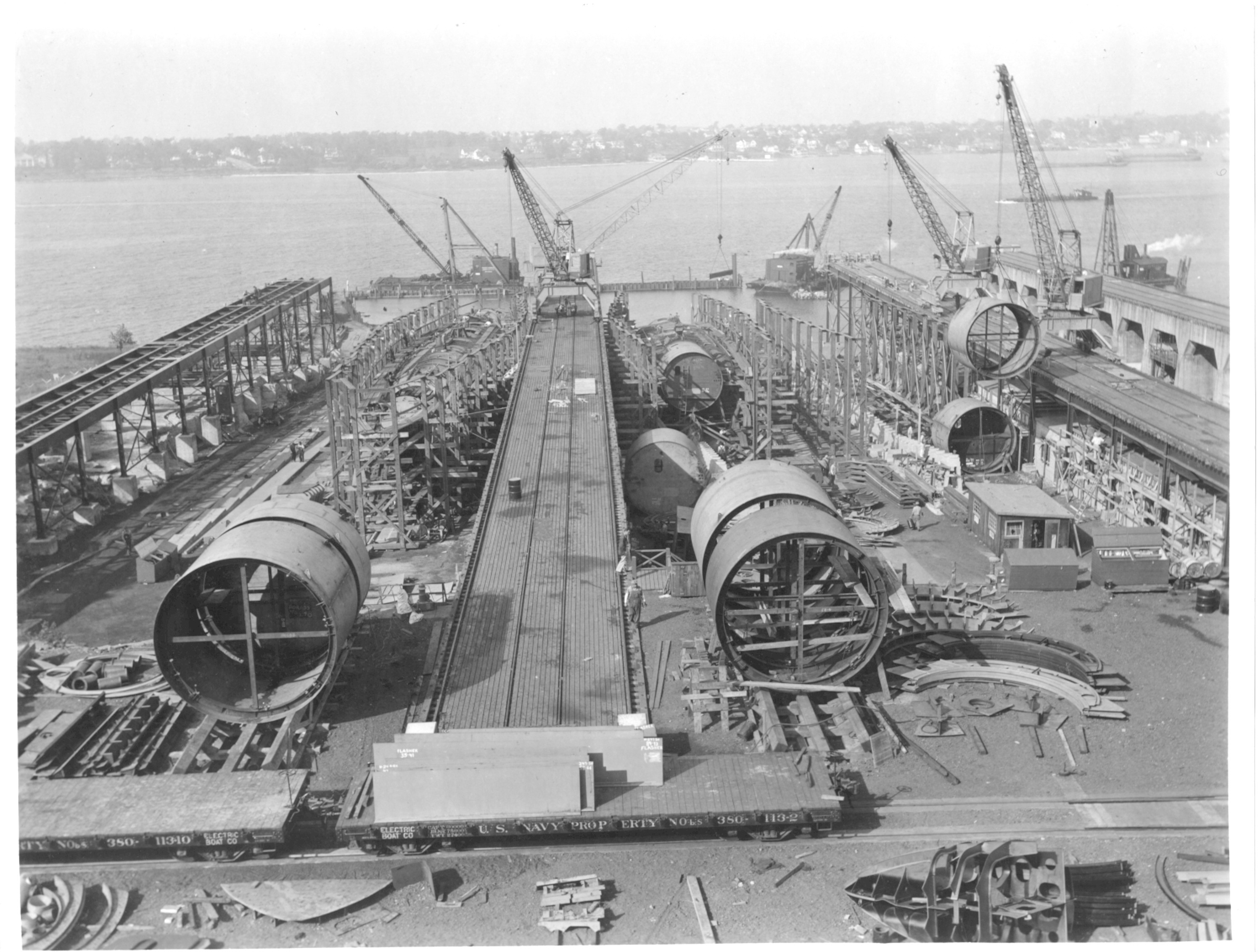
Victory Yard, 1943

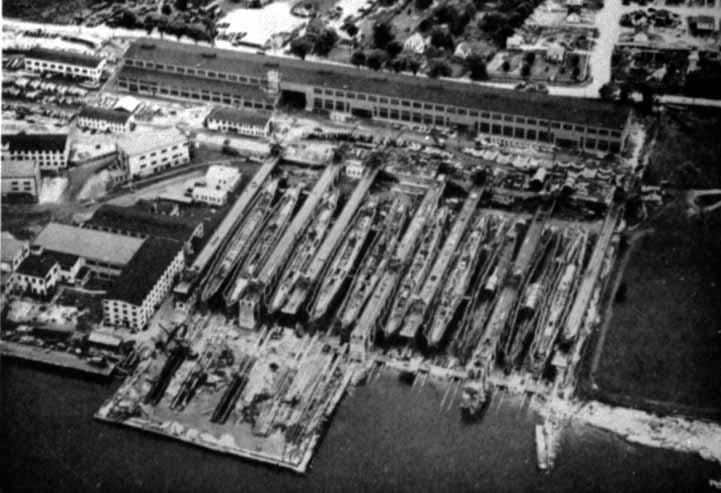
Victory Yard, Aerial

The Victory Yard was a temporary expansion of the General Dynamics Electric Boat facility in Groton, Connecticut, to dramatically increase submarine construction during World War II.

== Early property ownership ==
On 5 February 1942, the US Navy purchased the former Groton Iron Works property from Alfred Holter and Shell Oil Company for $222,000 using condemnation proceedings. $9.5 million was spent to construct the Victory Yard, where General Dynamics Electric Boat began building submarines on 22 July 1942. On 3 November 1943 a Federal Court Committee awarded an additional $203,000 to the former owners.

== Submarines built at the Victory Yard ==
EB Hull #	Way	Name	Class	Keel Laid	Launched	Commissioned
66	2-V	USS Dace (SS-247)	Gato	22 July 1942	25 April 1943	23 July 1943
68	3-V	USS Dorado (SS-248)	Gato	27 August 1942	23 May 1943	28 August 1943
71	4-V	USS Flasher (SS-249)	Gato	30 September 1942	20 June 1943	25 September 1943
73	5-V	USS Flier (SS-250)	Gato	30 October 1942	11 July 1943	18 October 1943
76	6-V	USS Flounder (SS-251)	Gato	5 December 1942	22 August 1943	29 November 1943
78	7-V	USS Gabilan (SS-252)	Gato	5 January 1943	19 September 1943	28 December 1943
79	8-V	USS Bream (SS-243)	Gato	5 February 1943	17 October 1943	24 January 1944
80	9-V	USS Cavalla (SS-244)	Gato	4 March 1943	14 November 1943	29 February 1944
81	10-V	USS Cobia (SS-245)	Gato	17 March 1943	28 November 1943	29 March 1944
82	1-V	USS Croaker (SS-246)	Gato	1 April 1943	19 December 1943	21 April 1944
89	2-V	USS Becuna (SS-319)	Balao	29 April 1943	30 January 1944	27 May 1944
91	3-V	USS Besugo (SS-321)	Balao	27 May 1943	27 February 1944	19 June 1944
93	4-V	USS Caiman (SS-323)	Balao	24 June 1943	30 March 1944	17 July 1944
95	5-V	USS Blower (SS-325)	Balao	15 July 1943	23 April 1944	10 August 1944
98	6-V	USS Charr (SS-328)	Balao	26 August 1943	28 May 1944	23 September 1944
100	7-V	USS Brill (SS-330)	Balao	23 September 1943	25 June 1944	26 October 1944
102	8-V	USS Bullhead (SS-332)	Balao	21 October 1943	16 July 1944	4 December 1944
104	9-V	USS Cabezon (SS-334)	Balao	18 November 1943	27 August 1944	30 December 1944
106	10-V	USS Capitaine (SS-336)	Balao	2 December 1943	1 October 1944	26 January 1945
108	1-V	USS Carp (SS-338)	Balao	23 December 1943	12 November 1944	28 February 1945
110	2-V	USS Entemedor (SS-340)	Balao	3 February 1944	17 December 1944	6 April 1945
112	3-V	USS Chopper (SS-342)	Balao	2 March 1944	4 February 1945	25 May 1945
114	4-V	USS Cobbler (SS-344)	Balao	3 April 1944	1 April 1945	8 August 1945
116	5-V	USS Corporal (SS-346)	Balao	27 April 1944	10 June 1945	9 November 1945

== Subsequent property uses ==
On 13 January 1945, General Dynamics Electric Boat announced that $3,000,000 will be spent to convert the Victory Yard to manufacture 105mm shells.

On 18 December 1946, Pfizer Inc purchased the property from the War Assets Administration. Purchase price was $911,999.
