= Operation Keystone (video game) =

1986 video game

- Publisher(s): Overt Strategic Simulations
- Release: 1986
- Genre(s): Wargame

Operation Keystone is a 1986 video game published by Overt Strategic Simulations.

== Gameplay ==
Operation Keystone is a game in which the player is in command of the Gato-class submarine USS Tang against the ships of the Japanese Navy.

== Reception ==
Mark Bausman reviewed the game for Computer Gaming World, and stated that "This reviewer found Operation Keystone to be an excellent game that maintains a good feel of real-time combat activity."

== Reviews ==
- Fire & Movement #76
