= Gato-class submarine =

US Navy fleet submarine class

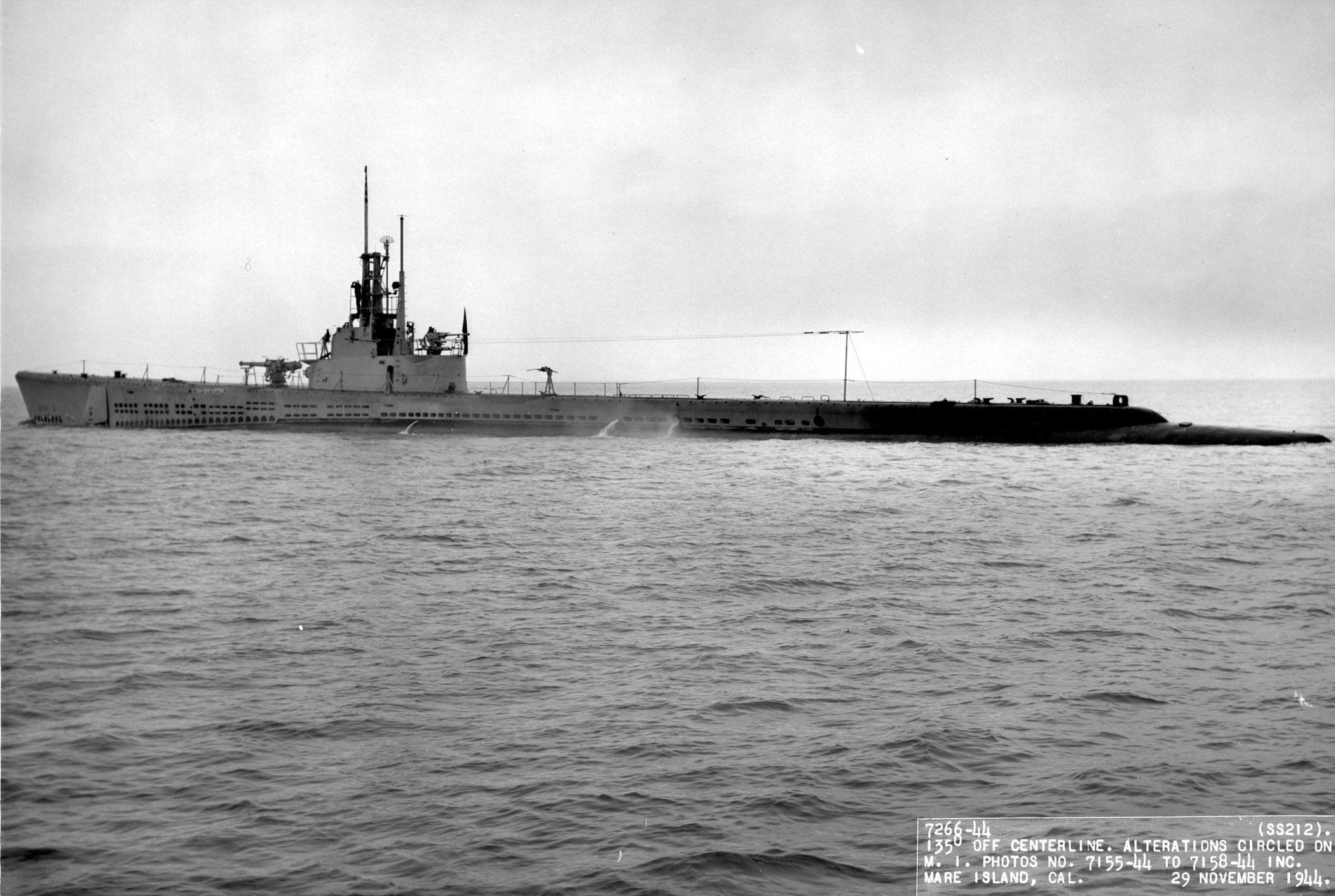
- USS Gato off Mare Island Navy Yard, on 29 November 1944

Class overview
- Name: Gato class
- Builders: Electric Boat Company; Portsmouth Naval Shipyard; Mare Island Naval Shipyard; Manitowoc Shipbuilding Company
- Operators: United States Navy; Italian Navy; Turkish Naval Forces; Hellenic Navy; Brazilian Navy; Japan Maritime Self-Defense Force
- Preceded by: Mackerel class
- Succeeded by: Balao class
- Built: 1940–1944
- In commission: 1941–1969
- Completed: 77
- Lost: 20
- Retired: 57
- Preserved: 6

General characteristics
- Type: Diesel-electric submarine
- Displacement: 1,525 tons (1,549 t) surfaced; 2,424 tons (2463 t) submerged
- Length: 311 ft 8 in (95.00 m) – 311 ft 10 in (95.05 m)
- Beam: 27 ft 3 in (8.31 m)
- Draft: 17 ft (5.2 m) maximum
- Propulsion: 4 × diesel engines driving electrical generators (Fairbanks-Morse, General Motors, or Hooven-Owens-Rentschler); 2 × 126-cell Sargo batteries; 4 × high-speed electric motors with reduction gears (Elliott Company, General Electric, or Allis-Chalmers) two propellers; 5,400 shp (4.0 MW) surfaced; 2,740 shp (2.04 MW) submerged
- Speed: 21 knots (39 km/h; 24 mph) surfaced; 9 knots (17 km/h; 10 mph) submerged
- Range: 11,000 nautical miles (20,000 km; 13,000 mi) surfaced at 10 knots (12 mph)
- Endurance: 48 hours at 2 knots (3.7 km/h; 2.3 mph) submerged; 75 days on patrol
- Test depth: 300 ft (90 m)
- Complement: 6 officers, 54 enlisted men
- Armament: 10 × 21-inch (533 mm) torpedo tubes; 6 forward, 4 aft; 24 torpedoes; 1 × 3-inch (76 mm) / 50 caliber deck gun; Bofors 40 mm and Oerlikon 20 mm cannon

The Gato class of submarines was built for the United States Navy and launched in 1941–1943. Named after the lead vessel of the class, USS Gato, they were the first mass-produced U.S. submarine class of World War II.

The Gato class, along with the closely related Balao and Tench classes that followed, accounted for most of the Navy's World War II submarines; they destroyed much of the Japanese merchant marine and a large portion of the Imperial Japanese Navy. In some references, the Gato boats are combined with their successors, especially the Balao class.

Gato's name comes from a species of small catshark. Like most other U.S. Navy submarines of the period, boats of the Gato class were given the names of aquatic creatures.

== Design ==
=== AA-1 class and V-boats ===
The Gato-class boats were considered to be fleet submarines, designed to operate as adjuncts to the main battle fleet, based on standard-type battleships since World War I. They were to scout out ahead of the fleet and report on the enemy fleet's composition, speed, and course, then they were to attack and whittle down the enemy in preparation for the main fleet action, a titanic gun battle between battleships and cruisers. This was an operational concept born from experience in World War I. To operate effectively in this role, a submarine had to have high surface speed, long range and endurance, and heavy armament. Limitations in submarine design and construction in the 1920s and 1930s made this combination of qualities very difficult to achieve. The U.S. Navy experimented constantly with this concept in the post-World War I years, producing a series of submarines with less than stellar qualities and reliability, the AA-1 class (also known as the T class) and the V-boats, of which V-1 through V-3 were an unsuccessful attempt to produce a fleet submarine.

=== Tambor and Gar classes ===
By 1931, the experimental phase of fleet submarine development was over and the Navy began to make solid progress towards what would eventually be the Gato class. By 1940, a much better developed industrial base and experience gained from the Porpoise-, Salmon-, and Sargo-class boats resulted in the Tambor and Gar classes. Finally, the U.S. Navy had hit the right combination of factors and now had the long-desired fleet submarine.

Timing, however, conspired against the actual use of these boats in their assigned role. The attack on Pearl Harbor on 7 December 1941 destroyed the Pacific Fleet battle line and along with it the concept of the battleship-led gun battle, as well as 20 years of submarine strategic concept development. It left the fleet submarine without a mission. Fortunately, the same capabilities that would have enabled these submarines to operate with the fleet made them superbly qualified for their new mission of commerce raiding against the Japanese Empire.

Timing, however, also conspired to make the Gatos a mass-produced class of submarines. Six units were planned in FY41. In the immediate aftermath of the Two-Ocean Navy Act 48 additional units were ordered. By the end of 1941, 33 Gato keels had been laid.

=== Gato class ===
The Gato-class design, with a top range of 11,000 nautical miles (20,000 km), was a near-duplicate of the preceding Tambor- and Gar-class submarines. The only significant differences were an increase in diving depth from 250 feet (76 m) to 300 feet (91 m) and an extra 5 ft in length to allow the addition of a watertight bulkhead dividing the one large engine room in two, with two diesel generators in each room. The Gato boats, along with nearly all of the U.S. Navy fleet-type submarines of World War II, were of partial double-hulled construction. The inner, pressure-resisting hull was wrapped by an outer, hydrodynamic hull. The voids between the two hulls provided space for fuel and ballast tanks. The outer hull merged with the pressure hull at both ends in the area of the torpedo room bulkheads, hence the "partial" double hull. Operational experience with earlier submarines led the naval architects and engineers at the Navy's Bureau of Construction and Repair to believe that they had been unduly conservative in their estimates of hull strength. Without changing the construction or thickness of the pressure hull steel, they decided that the Gato-class boats would be fully capable of routinely operating at 300 ft, a 50-foot (15 m) increase in test depth over the preceding classes.

The Gato subs were slow divers when compared to some German and British designs, but that was mostly because they were significantly larger boats. Sufficient fuel bunkerage to provide the range necessary for 75-day patrols from Hawaii to Japan and back could be obtained only with a larger vessel, which would take longer to submerge than a smaller one. Acknowledging this limitation, the bureau designers incorporated a negative (sometimes called a "down express") tank into the design, which was flooded to provide a large amount of negative buoyancy at the start of the dive. Based on later wartime experience, the tank was normally kept full or nearly full at the surface, then emptied to a certain mark after the boat was submerged to restore neutral buoyancy. At the start of the war, these submarines could go from fully surfaced to periscope depth in about 45–50 seconds. The superstructure that sat atop the pressure hull provided the main walking deck when the vessel was surfaced and was free-flooding and full of water when it was submerged. When the dive began, the submarine would "hang" for a few extra seconds while this superstructure filled with water. In an attempt to speed this process, additional limber, or free-flooding, holes were drilled and cut into the superstructure to allow it to flood faster. By midwar, these measures combined with improved crew training got dive times down to 30–35 seconds, very fast for such a large submarine and acceptable to the boat's crew.

The large size of these boats did negatively affect both surfaced and underwater maneuverability when compared to smaller submarines. No practical fix for this was available due to the limitations of the installed hydraulic systems used to move the rudder. Although a point of concern, the turning radius was still acceptable. After the war, a few fleet submarines were fitted with an additional rudder topside at the very stern.

They had numerous crew comforts, including showers, air conditioning, refrigerated storage for food, generous freshwater distilling units, clothes washers, and bunks for nearly every crew member, luxuries virtually unheard of in other navies. The bureau designers felt that if a crew of 60–80 men was to be expected to conduct 75-day patrols in the warm waters of the Pacific, these features were vital to the health and efficiency of the crew, and could be added without impacting the boats’ warfighting abilities due to their large size. Air conditioning in particular had a very practical application, too, besides comfort. Should a submarine submerge for any length of time, the heat generated by the recently shut-down engines, electrical equipment, and body heat could quickly raise internal temperatures above 100 °F (38 °C). High humidity generated by tropical waters would condense and begin dripping into equipment, eventually causing electrical shorts and fires. Air conditioning, acting mostly as a dehumidifier, virtually eliminated this problem and greatly increased mechanical and electrical reliability. It proved to be a key factor in the success of these boats during World War II.

=== Torpedoes ===
At the beginning of World War II, the standard torpedo for US fleet submarines was the 21-inch, Mark 14 torpedo. Due to a shortage of this torpedo, several substitutions were authorized, including using the shorter Bliss-Leavitt Mark 9 torpedo and Mark 10 torpedo, and the surface-fired Bliss–Leavitt Mark 8 torpedo, Mark 11 torpedo, Mark 12 torpedo, and Mark 15 torpedo. The surface-fired torpedoes required minor modifications. Due to their excessive length, marks 11, 12, and 15 torpedoes were limited to the aft torpedo tubes only. As torpedo production ramped up and the bugs were worked out of the Mark 14, substitutions were less common. As the war progressed, the Navy introduced the electric wakeless Mark 18 torpedo and the Mark 23 torpedo, a simplified, high-speed-only version of the Mark 14. Additionally, a small, 19" swim-out acoustic homing Mark 27 torpedo supplemented the armament in fleet boats for defense against escorts. Near the end of the war, the offensive Mark 28 torpedo acoustic homing torpedo was introduced. Well after the war, the Mark 37 torpedo was introduced.

==== Deck guns ====
Deck guns varied during the war. Many targets in the Pacific War were sampans or otherwise not worth a torpedo, so the deck gun was an important weapon. Most ships began the war with a 3-inch (76 mm) /50 caliber Mk. 17 gun (although some ships received older Mk. 6 mounts due to shortages). The 3-inch (76 mm) gun was the model originally specified for the Gato class, but war experience led to the removal of 4-inch (100 mm)/50 caliber Mk. 9 guns from old S-class submarines to equip frontline ships. Beginning in late 1943, almost all were refitted with a 5-inch (130 mm)/25 caliber Mk. 17 gun, and some ships had two of these weapons. Additional antiaircraft guns included single 40 mm Bofors and twin 20 mm Oerlikon mounts, usually one of each.

==== Mine armament ====
Like the previous Tambor/Gar classes, the Gato class could substitute mines in place of torpedoes. For the Mk 10 and Mk 12 type mines used in World War II, each torpedo could be replaced by as many as two mines, giving the submarine a true maximum capacity of 48 mines. However, doctrine was to retain at least four torpedoes on mine-laying missions, which further limits the capacity to 40 mines, and this is often stated as the maximum in various publications. In practice during the war, submarines went out with at least eight torpedoes, and the largest minefields laid were 32 mines. After the war, the Mk 49 mine replaced the Mk 12, while the larger Mk 27 mine (in actuality an acoustic-homing torpedo) was also carried, which only allowed one mine replacing one torpedo. This mine could be set to travel 1000 to 5000 yards from the submarine before deploying (not to be confused with the Mk 27 homing torpedo).

==== Engine changes ====
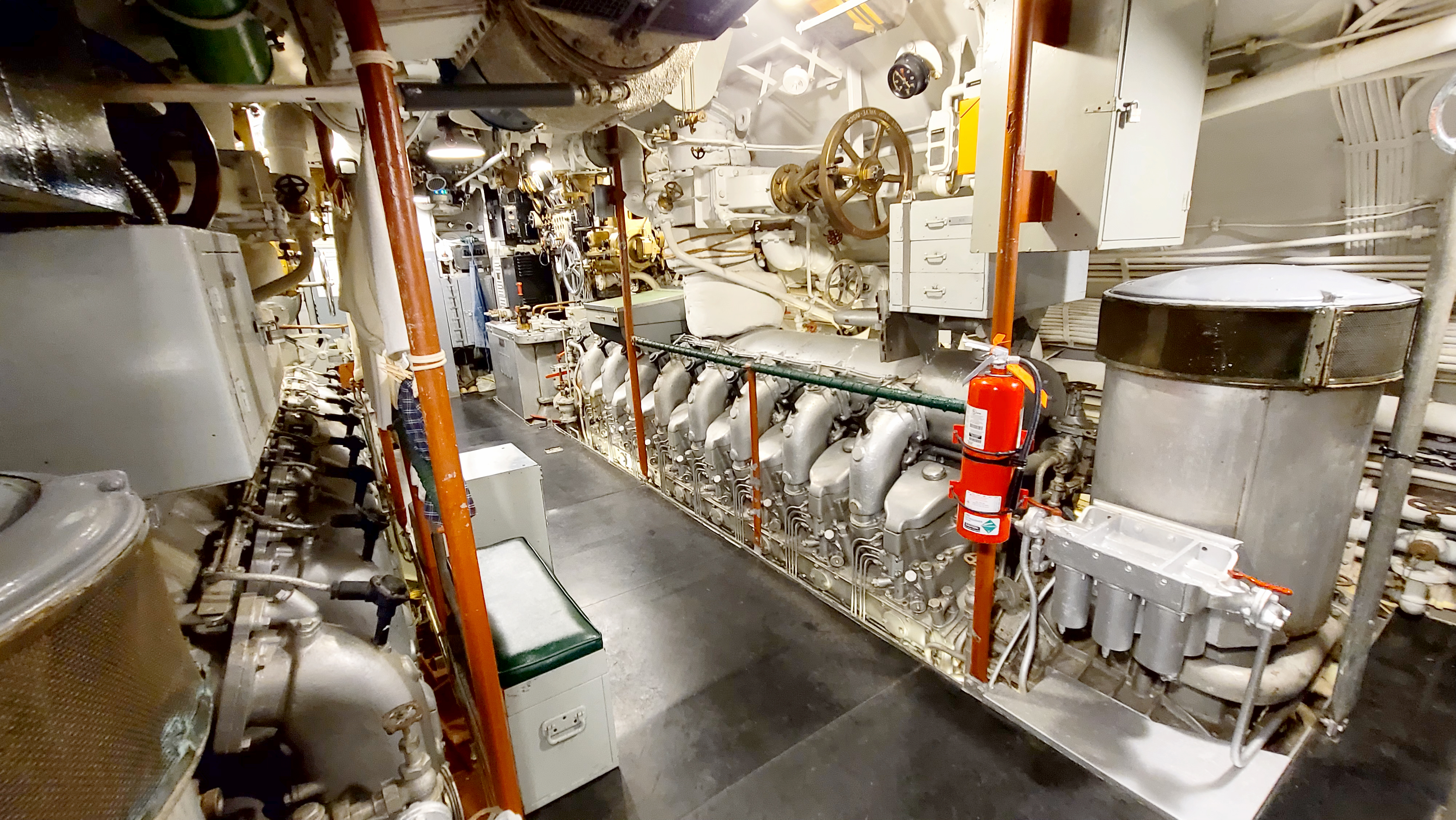
General Motors Cleveland Model 16-248 diesel engine

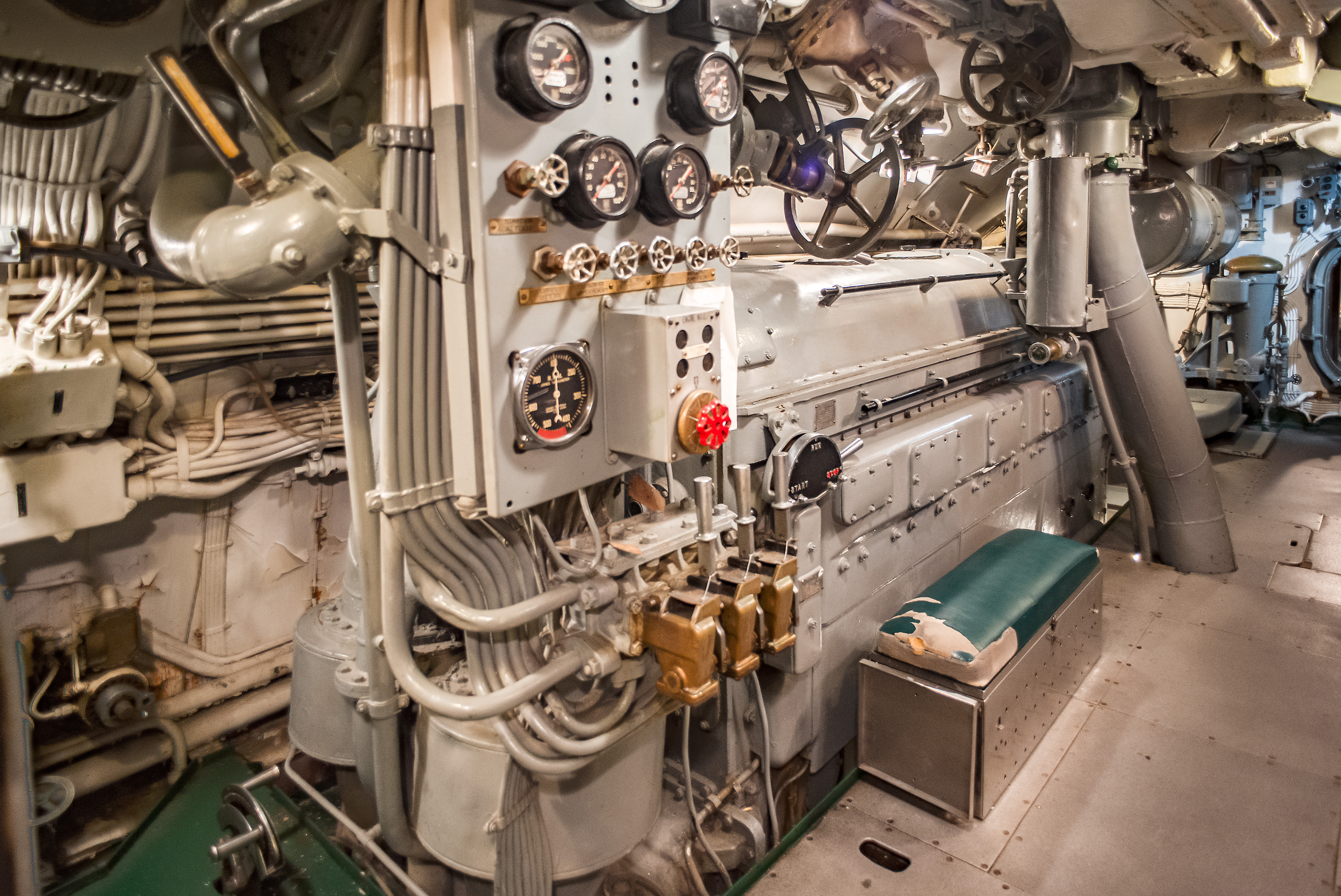
Fairbanks-Morse Model 38D8 1/8 diesel engine

Twelve submarines of this class built by Electric Boat (SS-253 to SS-264) received what would be the final installations of the Hooven-Owens-Rentschler double-acting diesel engine. The Navy had been tinkering with this engine off and on since 1937 because its unique design promised nearly twice the horsepower in a package the same size as other diesel engine types. However, the Hooven-Owens-Rentschler company ran into severe design and manufacturing problems, and these engines proved to have significant operational and maintenance issues. Frequent breakdowns and very poor reliability had destroyed these engines' reputation with the Navy, and they were all removed at the first opportunity and replaced by General Motors Cleveland Model 16-278A V-type diesels. The other Gato-class ships received either the Fairbanks-Morse 38D 8-1/8 nine-cylinder opposed-piston engine or the General Motors Cleveland Model 16-248 V-type as original installations. These engines were hardy, rugged, and well-liked by the crews and served the ships quite well. Both the Fairbanks-Morse and General Motors engines were two-stroke cycle types.

Two manufacturers supplied electric motors for the Gato class. Elliott Company motors were fitted primarily to boats with Fairbanks-Morse engines. General Electric motors were fitted primarily to boats with General Motors engines, but some Fairbanks-Morse boats received General Electric motors.

==== Fairwater changes ====
At the beginning of the war, Gato-class ships, as well as the Gar and Tambor classes, had fully shrouded fairwaters visually similar to modern nuclear submarines. Experience during the war led to the progressive reduction of this structure to reduce visibility and radar profile at the expense of underwater performance and foul-weather operating comfort. Most of the submarines in postwar movies show the final result of these modifications. A side benefit of these modifications was the creation of convenient locations for antiaircraft guns.

== Boats in class ==
Seventy-seven of these ships were commissioned from November 1941 (Drum) through April 1944 (Croaker). Twenty of the 52 U.S. submarines lost in World War II were of this class, plus Halibut, a damaged ship that returned to the U.S., but was considered a constructive total loss and not repaired.

Occasionally, some confusion arises as to the number of Gato-class submarines built, with some sources listing the total as 73, due to the transitional nature of the first four ships (SS-361 through SS-364) constructed under the second contract by the Manitowoc Shipbuilding Company of Manitowoc, Wisconsin. These were originally intended to be Balao-class subs and were assigned hull numbers that fall in the middle of the range of numbers for the Balao class (SS-285 to SS-416, SS-425, and SS-426). Manitowoc was a designated follow-on yard to Electric Boat; they used construction blueprints and plans supplied by Electric Boat and used many of the same suppliers. The government-owned shipyards (Portsmouth Naval Shipyard and Mare Island Naval Shipyard) began to make the transition to the new Balao design in the summer of 1942. Electric Boat, due to the huge backlog of Gato-class construction, was not ready to make the transition to the new design until January 1943. Manitowoc had already completed its allotted production run of Gatos and could not switch over to the Balao design until Electric Boat supplied them with the plans. Faced with a work stoppage while they waited for Electric Boat to catch up, managers at Manitowoc got permission to complete four additional boats (SS-361 through SS-364) to Electric Boat's Gato-class plans. Manitowoc's first Balao-class ship was Hardhead.

== History ==
=== World War II ===
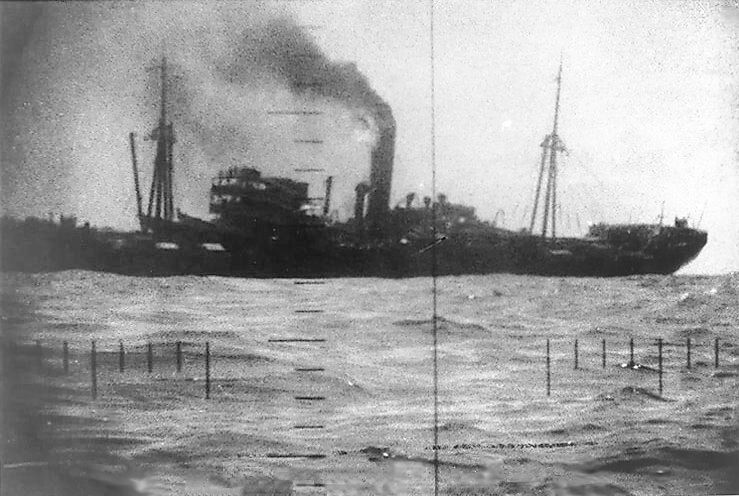
Periscope photograph of Japanese merchant ship sinking

The Gato boats were authorized in appropriations for fiscal year 1941, as part of President Franklin Roosevelt's proclamation of "limited emergency" in September 1939. The first boat laid down was actually USS Drum at Portsmouth Naval Shipyard on 11 September 1940. She was commissioned on 1 November 1941, and was the only Gato-class ship in commission when the war started. Gato herself was laid down on 5 October 1940 by the Electric Boat Company at Groton, Connecticut, and commissioned 31 December 1941. Due to its large construction capacity, more than half (41) of the class was built at Electric Boat facilities; three new slipways were added to the north yard and four slipways were added to the south yard to accommodate their production. In addition, the government purchased an old foundry downstream from the main yard, constructed 10 slipways, and turned the yard over to Electric Boat. Called the Victory Yard, it became an integral part of Electric Boat operations. A total of 77 Gatos were built at four different locations (Electric Boat, Manitowoc Shipbuilding, Portsmouth, and Mare Island).

All of the Gatos (with one exception, Dorado) would eventually fight in the Pacific Theater of Operations. However, in the summer of 1942, six new Gatos were assigned to Submarine Squadron 50 and sent to Rosneath, Scotland, to patrol the Bay of Biscay and to assist in the Operation Torch landings in North Africa. All in all, they conducted 27 war patrols, but could not claim any verified sinkings. Considered a waste of valuable resources, in mid-1943, all six ships were recalled and transferred to the Pacific.

Once they began to arrive in theater in large numbers in mid- to late 1942, the Gatos were in the thick of the fight against the Japanese. Many of these ships racked up impressive war records: Flasher, Rasher, and Barb were second, third, and fourth based on tonnage sunk by U.S. submarines. Silversides, Flasher, and Wahoo were third, fourth, and seventh place on the list for the number of ships sunk. Gato-class ships sank four Japanese submarines: I-29, I-168, I-351, and I-42; while only losing one in exchange, Corvina to I-176.

Their principal weapon was the steam-powered Mark 14 torpedo in the early war years, with the electric Mark 18 torpedo supplementing the Mark 14 in late 1943. Due to a stunted research-and-development phase in the Depression-era 1930s, and in great part due to the arrogance and stubbornness of its designer, the Naval Torpedo Station Newport under the Bureau of Ordnance, the "wonder weapon" Mark 14 proved to be full of bugs and very unreliable. They tended to run too deep, explode prematurely, run erratically, or fail to detonate. Bowing to pressure from the submariners in the Pacific, the bureau eventually acknowledged the problems in the Mark 14 and largely corrected them by late 1943. The Mark 18 electric torpedo, a hastily copied version of captured German G7e torpedoes, was rushed into service in the fall of 1943. Unfortunately, it also was full of faults, the most dangerous being a tendency to run in a circular pattern and come back at the boat that fired it. Once perfected, both types of torpedoes proved to be reliable and effective weapons, allowing the Gatos and other submarines to sink an enormous amount of Japanese shipping by the end of the war.

The Gatos were subjected to numerous exterior configuration changes during their careers, with most of these changes centered on the conning tower fairwater. The large, bulky original configuration proved to be too easy to spot when the boat was surfaced; it needed to be smaller. Secondly, the desire to incorporate new masts for surface- and air-search radars drove changes to the fairwater and periscope shears. Third, additional gun armament was needed, and cutting down the fairwater provided excellent mounting locations for machine guns and antiaircraft cannon. The modifications (or mods) to the Gato-class conning tower fairwaters were fairly uniform in nature and they can be grouped together based on what was done when:

- Mod 1 – This is the original configuration with the covered navigation bridge, the high bulwark around the aft "cigarette" deck, and with the periscope shears plated over. All the early boats were built with this mod and it lasted until about mid-1942.
- Mod 2 – Same as mod 1, but with the bulwark around the cigarette deck cut down to reduce the silhouette. This also gave the .50 caliber machine gun mounted there a greatly improved arc of fire. Began to appear in about April 1942.
- Mod 3 – Same as mod 2, but with the covered navigation bridge on the forward part of the fairwater cut away and the plating around the periscope shears removed. In this configuration, the Gatos now had two excellent positions for the mounting of single 40 mm Bofors or twin 20 mm Oerlikon antiaircraft cannon, an improvement over the .50 caliber machine gun. This mod started to appear in late 1942 and early 1943.
- Mod 4 – Same as the mod 3, but with the height of the bridge itself lowered in a last attempt to lessen the silhouette. The lowering of the bridge exposed three I-beams on either side of the periscope shears. These exposed beams gave rise to the nickname "covered wagon boats". Began to appear in early 1944.

Variations on the above mods included the 1A (shortened navigation bridge), 2A (plating removed from periscope shears), and the 3A and 4A (which moved the SJ radar mast aft of the periscopes). The conning tower fairwater of Flasher is preserved in Groton, Connecticut, in the mod 4A configuration, with two single 40 mm Bofors mounts.

== Notable examples ==
- Albacore sank the Japanese aircraft carrier Taihō. Taihō was the flagship of Vice-Admiral Jisaburo Ozawa's fleet during the Battle of the Philippine Sea and at the time Japan's newest carrier.
- Barb, on her 12th patrol in July 1945, landed a small team from her crew on the shore of Patience Bay on Karafuto. They placed charges under a railroad track and blew up a passing train. Barb also conducted several rocket attacks against shore targets on this same patrol, the first ever by an American submarine. They used 5-inch (130 mm) unguided rockets fired from a special launching rack on the main deck.
- Cavalla sank the Japanese aircraft carrier Shōkaku. Shōkaku was one of six Japanese carriers that had participated in the attack on Pearl Harbor.
- Cobia sank a ship carrying Japanese tank reinforcements that were en route to Iwo Jima.
- Cod went to the rescue of a grounded Dutch submarine HNLMS O-19, taking its crew on board and destroying the submarine when it could not be removed from the reef, the only international submarine-to-submarine rescue in history.
- Corvina was the only U.S. submarine sunk by a Japanese submarine (I-176) during the Second World War.
- Darter along with Dace conducted an aggressive and successful attack against Japanese fleet units during the lead up to the U.S. invasion of Leyte Island in the Philippines in October 1944. The two boats sank the heavy cruisers Atago and Maya and severely damaged the heavy cruiser Takao. A few hours later, while maneuvering back to the scene to finish off the crippled Takao, Darter ran hard aground on Bombay Shoal off Palawan. Her entire crew was rescued and subsequent attempts to destroy the wreck were only partially successful. As late as 1998, portions of Darter's hulk were still visible on the reef.
- Finback recovered downed pilot LTJG George H. W. Bush, future President of the United States, after his Grumman TBM Avenger torpedo bomber was damaged and eventually ditched during a bombing mission at Chichi-jima in the Pacific.
- Flasher was the second-highest scoring U.S. ship of the war, with 100,231 tons officially credited to her by the Joint Army–Navy Assessment Committee (JANAC).
- Growler's skipper, Howard W. Gilmore, earned the submarine force's first combat Medal of Honor for sacrificing his life to save his boat and his crew. Alone on the bridge after being wounded by enemy gunfire, and unable to reach the hatch after he had ordered the others below, he pressed his face to the phone and uttered the order that saved his ship and sealed his doom: "Take 'er down!"
- In Grunion, Mannert L. Abele earned the submarine force's first Navy Cross, when his boat engaged in a running battle with Japanese ships off Kiska in July 1942. Grunion was subsequently lost in this action. In 2006 and 2007, expeditions organized and led by Abele's sons, Bruce, Brad, and John, located and photographed the wreck of the Grunion using side-scan sonar and a remotely operated vehicle.
- Halibut was essentially the 53rd U.S. submarine loss of the war. Terribly damaged in an aircraft-borne depth charge attack on 14 November 1944, she barely limped back to port in Saipan. Temporarily patched up, she was sent back to the United States. Examined by engineers, she was found to be beyond economical repair and was decommissioned on 18 July 1945, never having made another war patrol. Her entire crew survived.
- Harder was commanded by Samuel D. Dealey, the only submarine commander of the war (perhaps the only one ever) to sink five enemy destroyers, four in a single patrol.
- Mingo, which sank two Japanese ships during her patrols, was lent to the Japanese Maritime Self Defense Force after the war, serving under the name Kuroshio.
- Rasher's notable record during World War II included eight patrols in the Pacific. She sank the third- or second-most tonnage during the war. She served the U.S. Navy until 1967.
- Silversides is officially credited with sinking 23 ships, the third-most of any allied World War II submarine, behind only USS Tang and USS Tautog, according to JANAC figures.
- Trigger became famous in Edward L. "Ned" Beach's book Submarine! (which was a kind of eulogy to her).
- Tunny sank the Japanese submarine I-42 on the night of 23 March 1944, after the two subs dueled for position for over an hour. A week later, Tunny engaged the Japanese battleship Musashi and inflicted enough damage for Musashi to return to dry dock for repairs.
- Wahoo, commanded by one of the submarine force's most famous skippers, Dudley W. "Mush" Morton, engaged in a running gun and torpedo battle with a convoy of four ships off the coast of New Guinea and destroyed the entire convoy. She was also one of the first U.S. subs into the Sea of Japan. She was sunk while exiting the Sea of Japan through the La Perouse Strait in October 1943 while on her seventh patrol.

== Postwar service ==
At the end of World War II, the U.S. Navy found itself in an awkward position. The 56 remaining Gato-class submarines, designed to fight an enemy that no longer existed, were largely obsolete, despite the fact they were only two to four years old. Such was the pace of technological development during the war that a submarine with only a 300-foot test depth was going to be of little use, despite being modern in most other aspects. Enough of the Balao and Tench ships, with their greater diving depth, remained that the Gatos were superfluous for front-line missions. The Greater Underwater Propulsion Power Program (GUPPY) modernization program of the late 1940s largely passed these ships by. Only Barb and Dace received GUPPY conversions; these were austere GUPPY IB modernizations under project SCB 47A prior to their transfer to the Italian Navy. However, the U.S. Navy found itself new missions to perform, and for some of these the Gatos were well suited. The last two Gato-class ships active in the U.S. Navy were Rock and Bashaw, which were both decommissioned on 13 September 1969 and sold for scrap.

=== Radar picket ===
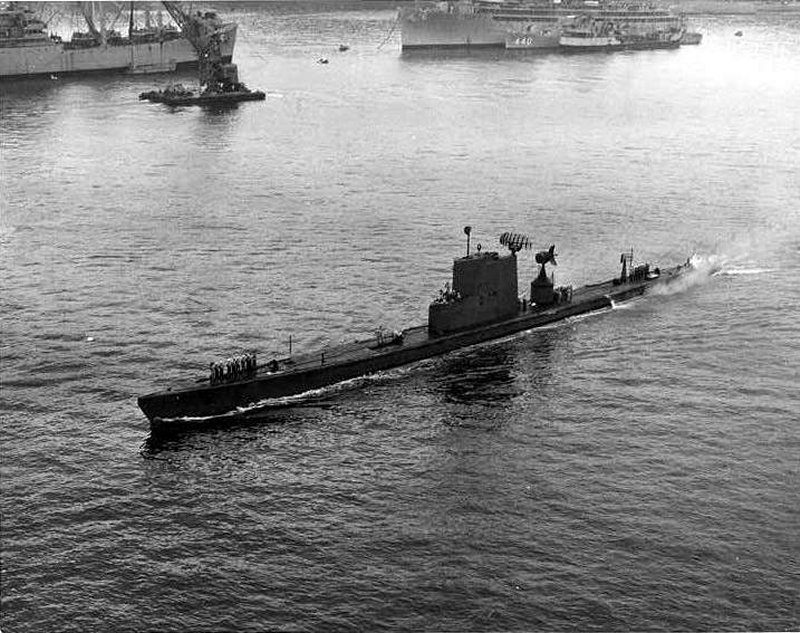
USS Raton (SSR-270)

The advent of the kamikaze demonstrated the need for a long-range radar umbrella around the fleet. Surface ships refitted with powerful radar suites were put into service, but they proved vulnerable in this role, as they could be attacked as well, leaving the fleet blind. A submarine, though, could dive and escape aerial attack. Two Gato-class ships (Grouper and Finback) received rudimentary conversions to radar pickets before the end of World War II, but were not used in this role. After further experimenting with the concept on four Balao and Tench-class boats under Projects Migraine I and II, and realizing that a deep diving depth was not overly important in this role, six Gatos were taken in hand (Pompon, Rasher, Raton, Ray, Redfin, and Rock) for conversion under Project Migraine III (aka SCB 12A). They were lengthened by 24 feet (7.3 m) to provide additional space for an air control center and had powerful air-search and height-finding radars installed, with the after torpedo room converted into an electronics space with torpedoes and tubes removed. They also received a streamlined "sail" in place of the traditional conning tower fairwater. Redesignated as SSRs, these ships were only moderately successful in this role, as the radars themselves proved troublesome and somewhat unreliable. The radars were removed and the ships temporarily reverted to general-purpose submarines after 1959.

=== Hunter-killer ===
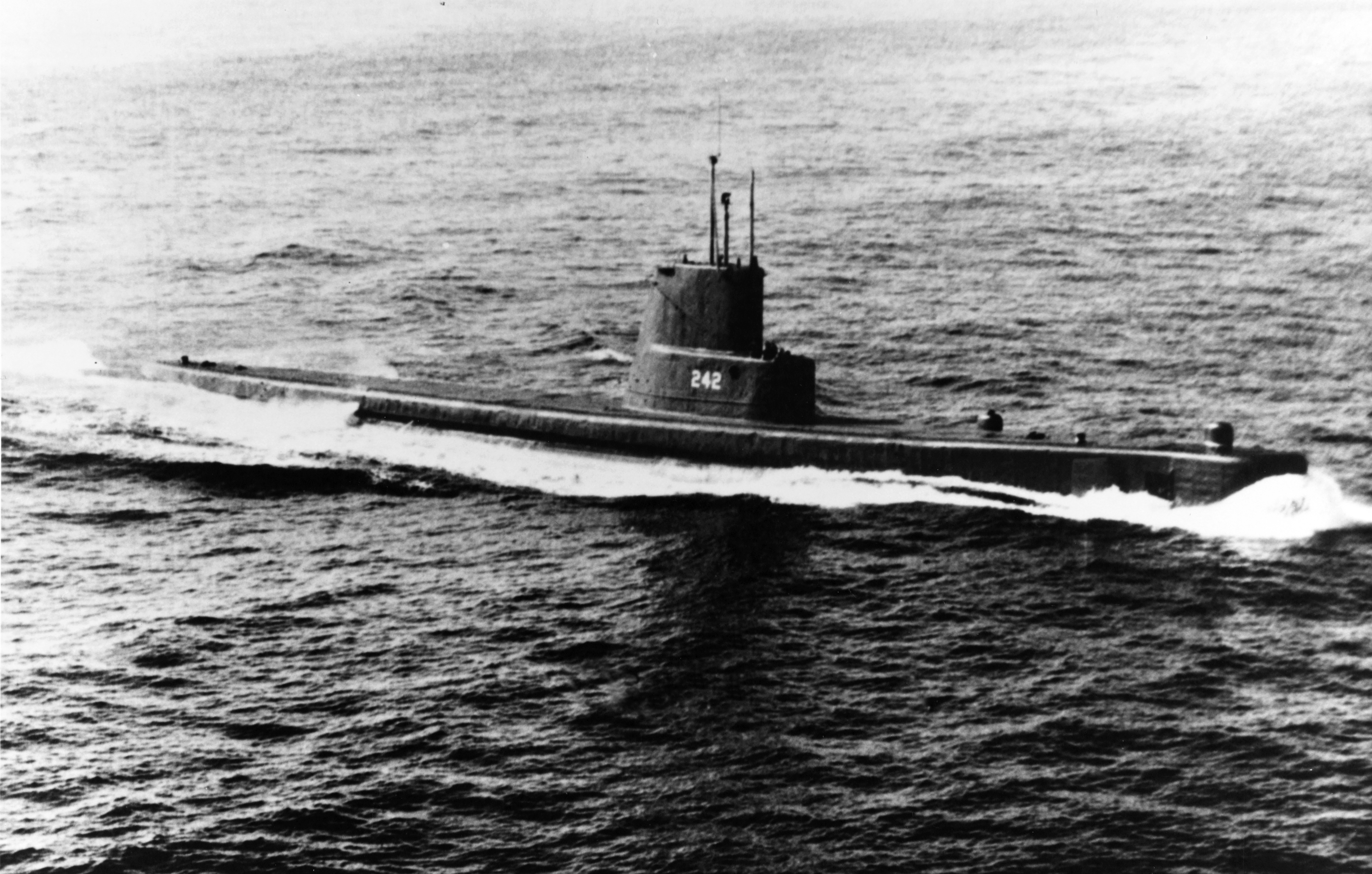
USS Bluegill (SSK-242)

The threat of the Soviet Navy building hundreds of Type XXI-derived submarines (eventually the 215-strong Whiskey class and dozens of others) in the Atlantic led the U.S. Navy to adapt submarines to specifically hunt other submarines, a radically new role for the 1950s. Concluding that this role did not require a fast or deep-diving submarine (this line of thought would quickly change with the advent of nuclear power), seven Gatos were converted to SSKs (hunter-killer submarines) between 1951 and 1953, joining three purpose-built K-1-class SSKs entering service at that time. The Gato class was chosen because large numbers were available in the reserve fleet should rapid mobilization become necessary, and the deeper-diving classes were more suitable for GUPPY rather than SSK conversions. A streamlined GUPPY-style sail was installed, a large sonar array was wrapped around the bow (losing two torpedo tubes in the process), the ships were extensively silenced including the removal of the two forward diesel engines, and they received a snorkel. Grouper was converted under project SCB 58 as the test ship for the concept, having her sonar array at the forward end of the sail instead of the better position at the bow. The other ships in the program included Angler, Bashaw, Bluegill, Bream, Cavalla, and Croaker.

Eventually more advanced sonars were installed on the new nuclear subs: Tullibee, commissioned in 1960, introduced the bow-mounted sonar sphere. Tullibee was an attempt to develop a slow but ultra-quiet nuclear-powered SSK equivalent; no others were built due to her unexpectedly high cost relative to the more capable Thresher, and the SSK mission was folded into the regular attack submarine role. The slow and less capable diesel SSKs were decommissioned or reassigned to other roles in 1959, and all except Croaker and Cavalla (eventually preserved as memorials) were scrapped in 1968 and 1969.

=== Guided-missile submarine ===
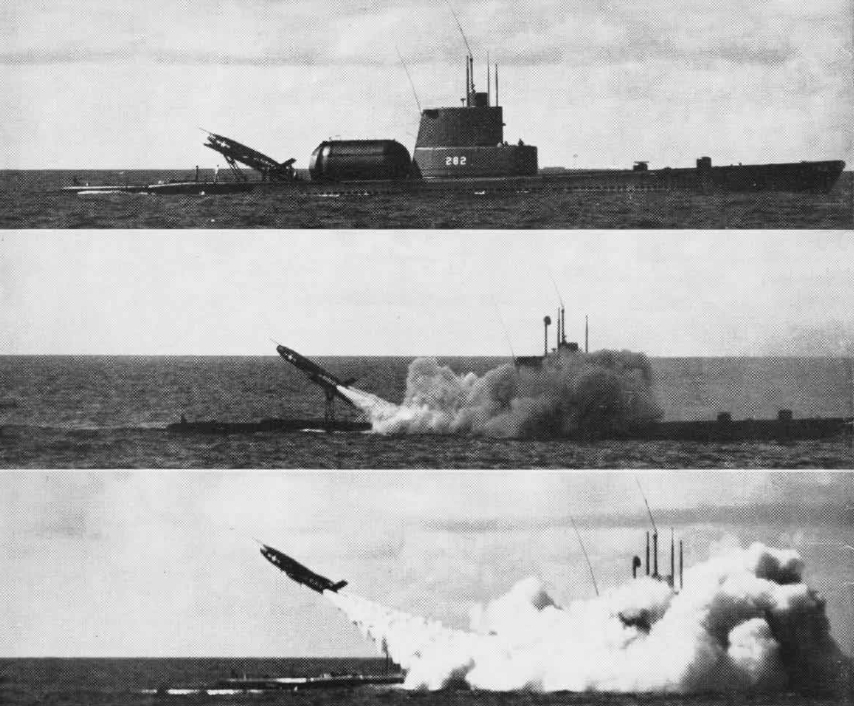
Tunny fires a Regulus I missile

The Regulus nuclear cruise missile program of the 1950s provided the U.S. Navy with its first strategic missile capability. Tunny was converted under SCB 28 in 1953 to house and fire this large surface-launched missile and was designated SSG (guided-missile submarine). She could carry two of the missiles in a cylindrical hangar on the aft deck. She made strategic deterrent patrols with Regulus until 1964, when the program was discontinued in favor of Polaris.

=== Transport submarine ===
With the retirement of the Regulus missile system in 1965, Tunny was converted into a troop transport in 1966. She was redesignated as an APSS (transport submarine), replacing Perch in this role. Her Regulus hangar became a lockout chamber for UDT, SEAL, and Marine Force Recon teams in the Vietnam War. On 1 January 1969, Tunny's designation was changed to LPSS (amphibious transport submarine); however, she was replaced by Grayback and decommissioned in June of that year.

=== Submarine oiler ===
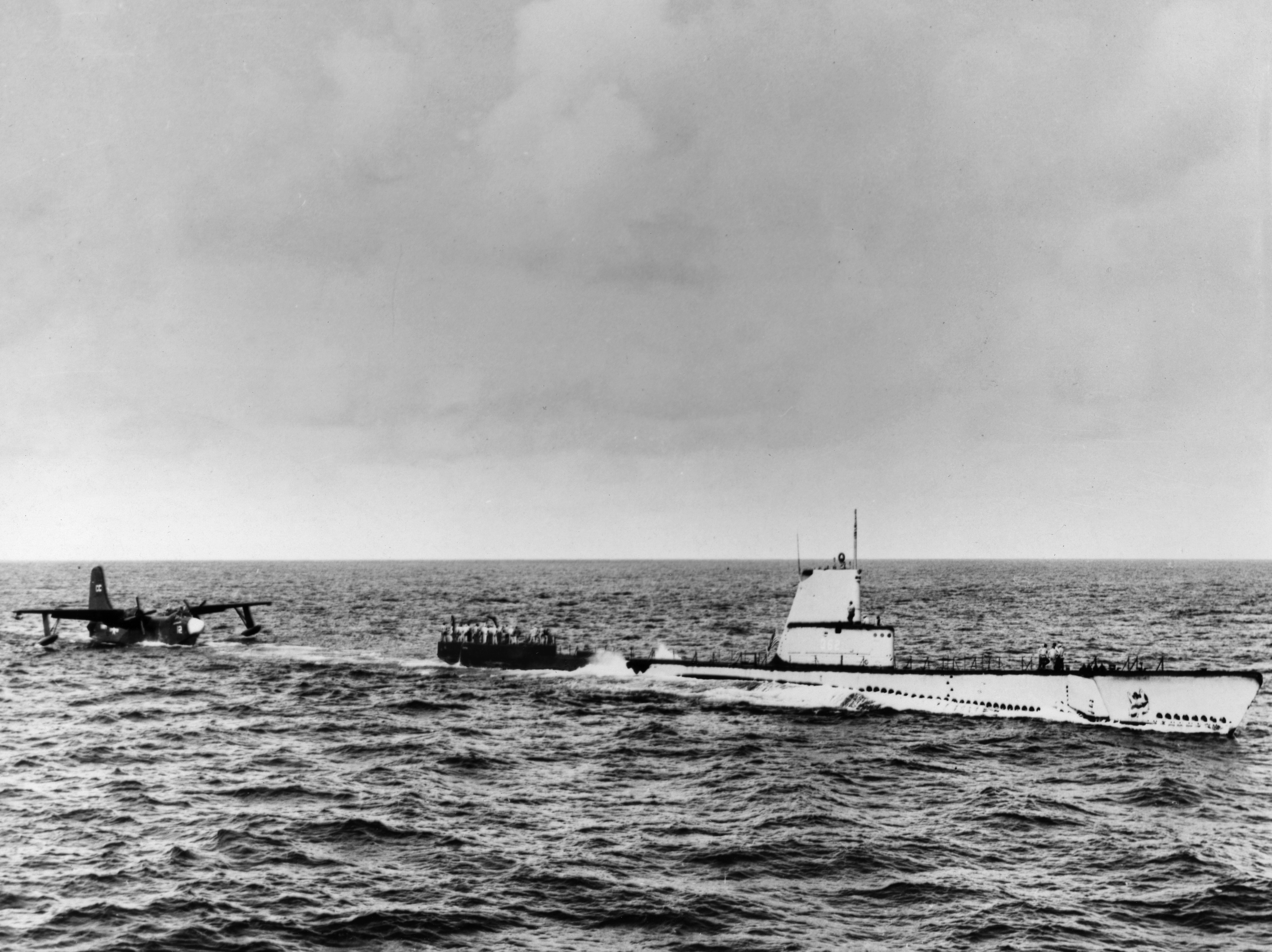
Guavina (AGSS-362), refueling a P5M Marlin flying boat in 1955

Guavina was converted under SCB 39 to a SSO in 1950 to carry fuel oil, gasoline, and cargo to amphibious beachheads. She received additional "saddle" tanks wrapped around her outer hull to carry these fuels and a streamlined sail. After a few tests, the concept was dropped in 1951 as impractical, and Guavina served in the test role for a few years under the designation AGSS. In 1957, she converted back to the oiler/tanker role and carried the designation AOSS. This time, she experimented with refueling seaplanes at sea, which was potentially important, as refueling the nuclear-capable Martin P6M Seamaster at sea could improve the Navy's strategic strike capabilities. However, this mission, too, was dropped and Guavina was decommissioned.

=== Sonar test submarine ===
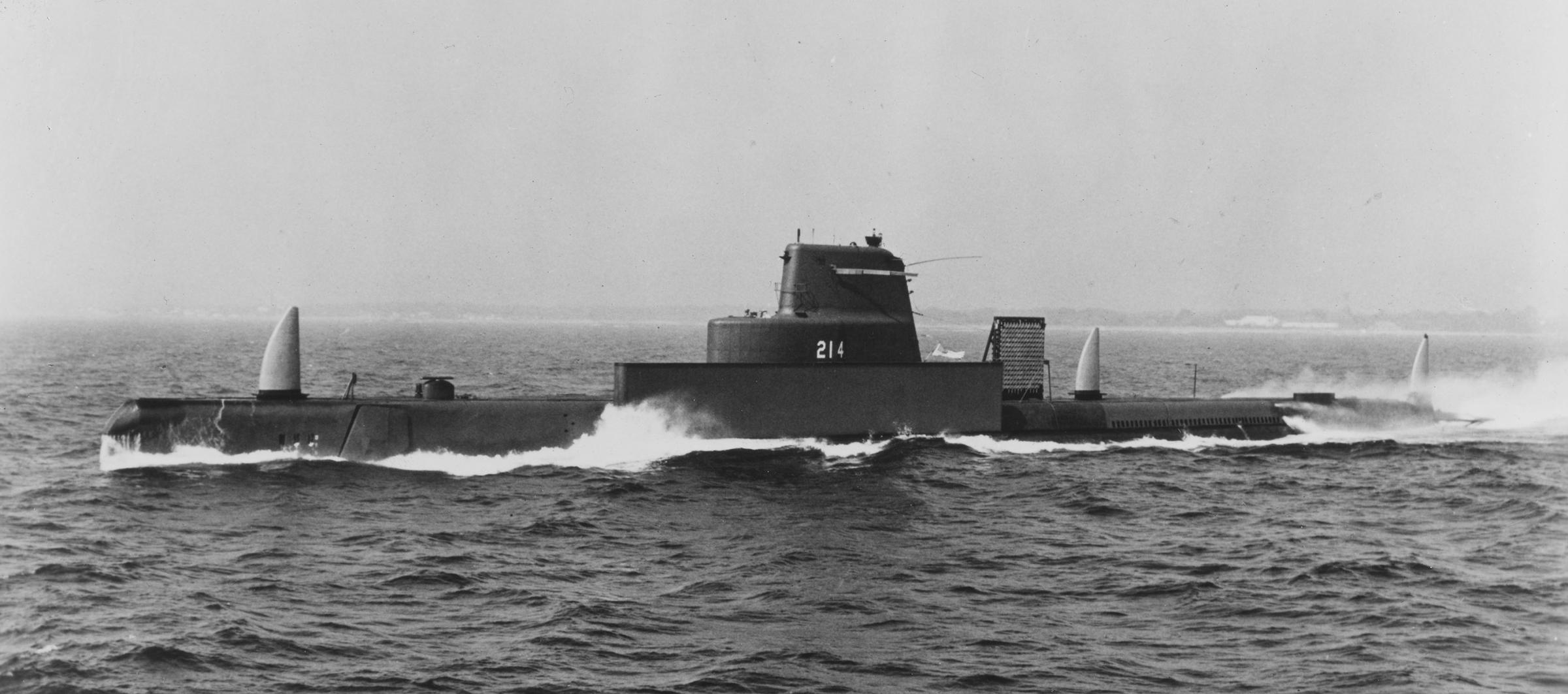
Grouper after conversion to a sonar test submarine

The development of advanced sonar systems took on a great deal of importance in the 1950s, and several fleet ships were outfitted with various strange-looking sonar transducer arrays and performed extensive tests. Two Gatos, Flying Fish and Grouper (previously the prototype hunter-killer ship) were assigned to these duties and proved to be key players in the development of new sonar capabilities. Grouper had all her forward torpedo tubes removed and the space was used as berthing for technicians and as a sonar lab. Flying Fish was decommissioned in 1954, but Grouper continued in the test role until 1968.

=== Naval Reserve trainer ===
Interested in maintaining a ready pool of trained reservists, the Navy assigned numerous fleet ships to various coastal and inland ports (even in Great Lakes ports such as Chicago, Cleveland, and Detroit) where they served as a training platform during the reservists' weekend drills. Twenty-eight Gato-class ships served in this capacity, some as late as 1971. In this role, the ships were rendered incapable of diving and had their propellers removed. They were used strictly as pierside trainers. These were in commission, but classed as "in commission in reserve", thus some were decommissioned and recommissioned on the same day to reflect the change in status.

=== Foreign service ===
The large numbers of relatively modern, but surplus U.S. fleet submarines proved to be popular in sales, loans, or leases to allied foreign navies. While most of these ships were of the more capable Balao and Tench classes, some Gatos went overseas, as well. Italy received two (Barb and Dace), which received the only GUPPY conversions given to Gato-class ships (Guppy IB). Japan received one (Mingo), Brazil two (Muskallunge and Paddle), Greece two (Lapon and Jack), and Turkey two (Guitarro and Hammerhead). The ships transferred to Japan and Brazil did not receive any modernizations (streamlining and snorkels) prior to transfer, but the four ships sent to Greece and Turkey did receive snorkels and partial streamlining to the fairwater.

== Museums ==
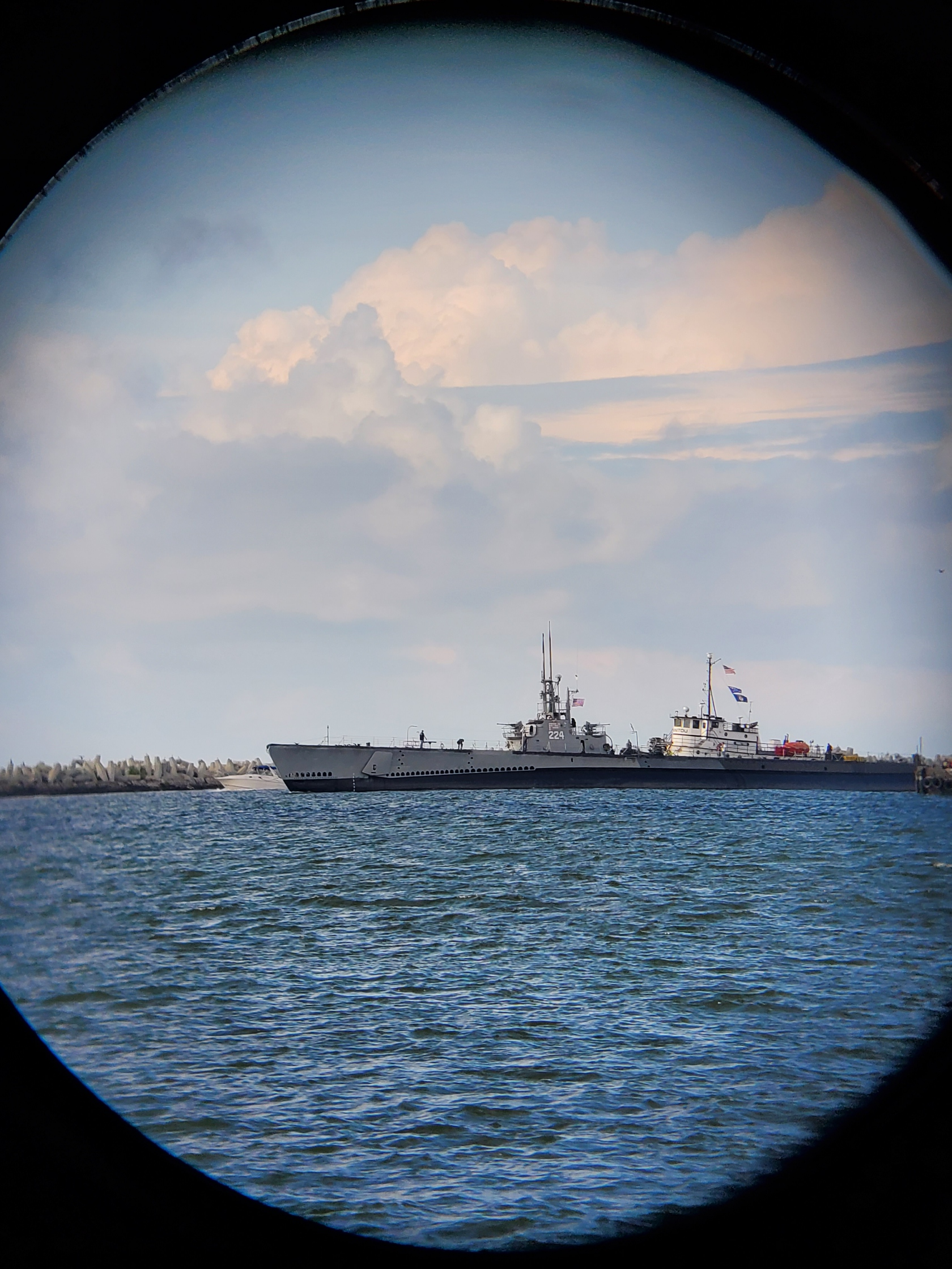
Cod returns to Cleveland on 18 August 2021 after her dry docking project completion in Erie aided by the tug Manitou

Six Gato-class submarines are open to public viewing. They primarily depend on revenue generated by visitors to keep them operational and up to U.S. Navy standards; each ship gets a yearly inspection and a "report card". Some ships, such as Cod and Silversides, have been used in film production.

=== Surviving ships ===
The following is a complete list of Gato-class museum ships:

- USS Cavalla is on display at Seawolf Park in Pelican Island, Texas. (in SSK configuration).
- USS Cobia is on display the Wisconsin Maritime Museum in Manitowoc, Wisconsin.
- USS Cod is on display at Cleveland's North Coast Harbor in Cleveland, Ohio.
- USS Croaker is on display at the Buffalo and Erie County Naval & Military Park in Buffalo, New York (in SSK configuration)
- USS Drum is on display on shore at Battleship Memorial Park in Mobile, Alabama.
- USS Silversides is on display at the USS Silversides Submarine Museum in Muskegon, Michigan.

== See also ==
- List of most successful American submarines in World War II
- Allied submarines in the Pacific War
- Unrestricted submarine warfare
- List of lost United States submarines
- List of submarines of the Second World War
- Ship Characteristics Board (SCB) - postwar project management
