= USS Corvina =

Submarine of the United States

Coordinates: 5°5′N 151°10′E

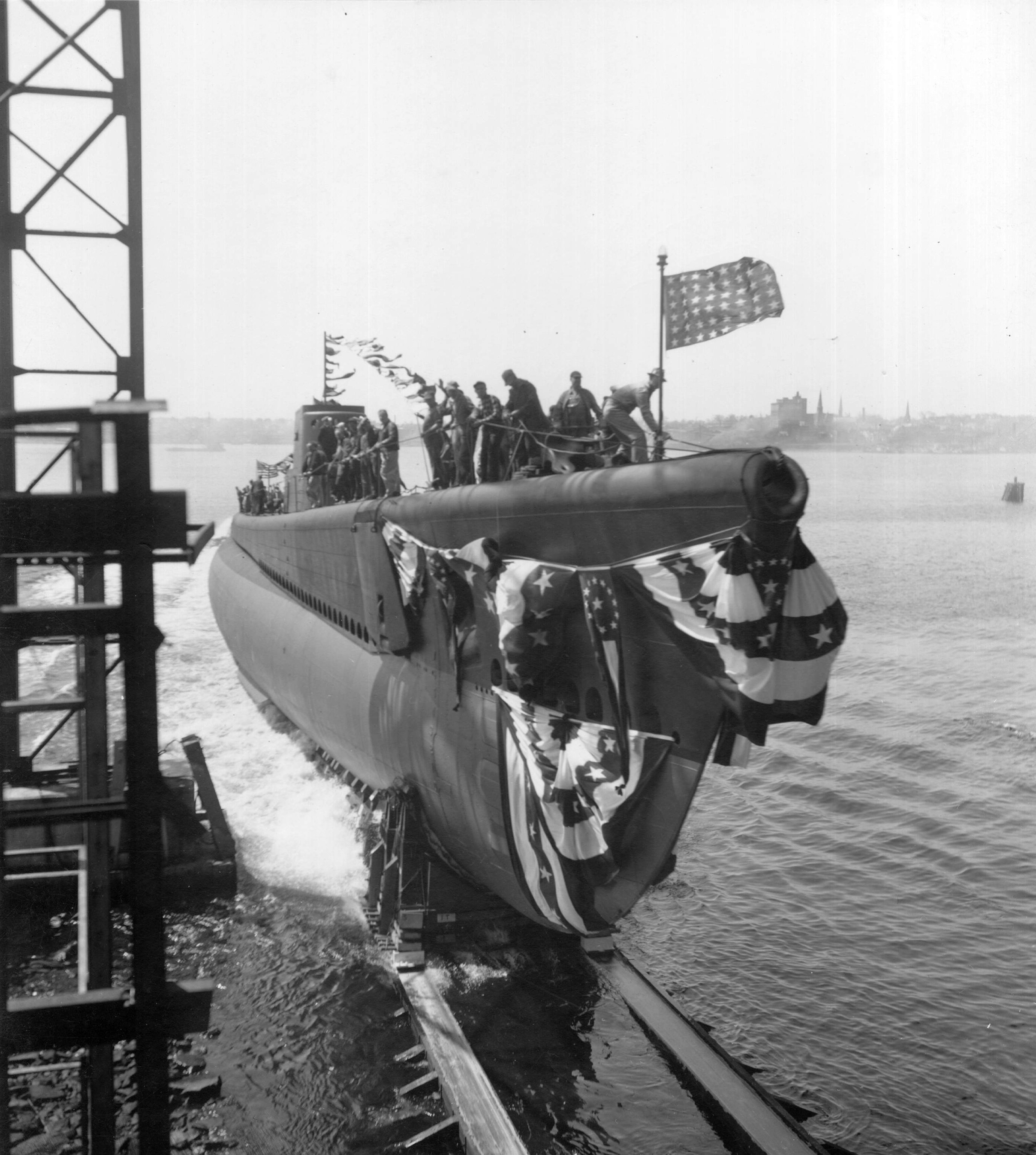
- USS Corvina SS-226

History

United States
- Name: Corvina
- Builder: Electric Boat Company, Groton, Connecticut
- Laid down: 21 September 1942
- Launched: 9 May 1943
- Sponsored by: Mrs. R. W. Christie
- Commissioned: 6 August 1943
- Fate: Sunk south of Truk Lagoon, 16 November 1943

General characteristics
- Class & type: Gato-class diesel-electric submarine
- Displacement: 1,525 long tons (1,549 t) surfaced; 2,424 long tons (2,463 t) submerged
- Length: 311 ft 9 in (95.02 m)
- Beam: 27 ft 3 in (8.31 m)
- Draft: 17 ft (5.2 m) maximum
- Propulsion: 4 × General Motors Model 16-248 V16 Diesel engines driving electric generators; 2 × 126-cell Sargo batteries; 4 × high-speed General Electric electric motors with reduction gears; two propellers; 5,400 shp (4.0 MW) surfaced; 2,740 shp (2.0 MW) submerged
- Speed: 21 knots (39 km/h) surfaced; 9 kn (17 km/h) submerged
- Range: 11,000 nmi (20,000 km) surfaced at 10 kn (19 km/h)
- Endurance: 48 hours at 2 kn (3.7 km/h) submerged; 75 days on patrol
- Test depth: 300 ft (90 m)
- Complement: 6 officers, 54 men,82 when sunk
- Armament: 10 × 21-inch (533 mm) torpedo tubes; 6 forward, 4 aft; 24 torpedoes; 1 × 3-inch (76 mm) / 50 caliber deck gun; Bofors 40 mm and Oerlikon 20 mm cannon

USS Corvina (SS-226), a Gato-class submarine, was the only ship of the United States Navy to be named for the corvina, as well as the only American submarine ever sunk by an enemy submarine.

== Construction and commissioning ==
Corvina's keel was laid down by the Electric Boat Company of Groton, Connecticut, on 21 September 1942. She was launched on 9 May 1943, sponsored by Mrs. LaRene P. Christie, wife of Rear Admiral Ralph. W. Christie, commander of submarine operations in Fremantle, Australia, and commissioned on 6 August 1943.

== Service record ==
Clearing New London, Connecticut, on 18 September 1943, Corvina arrived at Pearl Harbor on 14 October. She put out from Pearl Harbor on her maiden war patrol on 4 November, topped up her fuel tanks at Johnston Island two days later, and was never heard from again.

Her assignment had been a dangerous one, to patrol as closely as possible to the heavily guarded stronghold of Truk and to intercept any Japanese sortie endangering the forthcoming American invasion of the Gilbert Islands. Japanese records report that the Japanese submarine I-176 launched three torpedoes at an enemy submarine south of Truk on 16 November, claiming two hits, which resulted in the explosion of the target. The submarine was reported as presumed lost on 23 December 1943. Her loss with her crew of 82 was announced 14 March 1944, making Corvina the only American submarine to have been sunk by a Japanese submarine in the entire war.

== See also ==
- List of U.S. Navy losses in World War II
