= Groton Iron Works =

Cargo ship builder during WW1

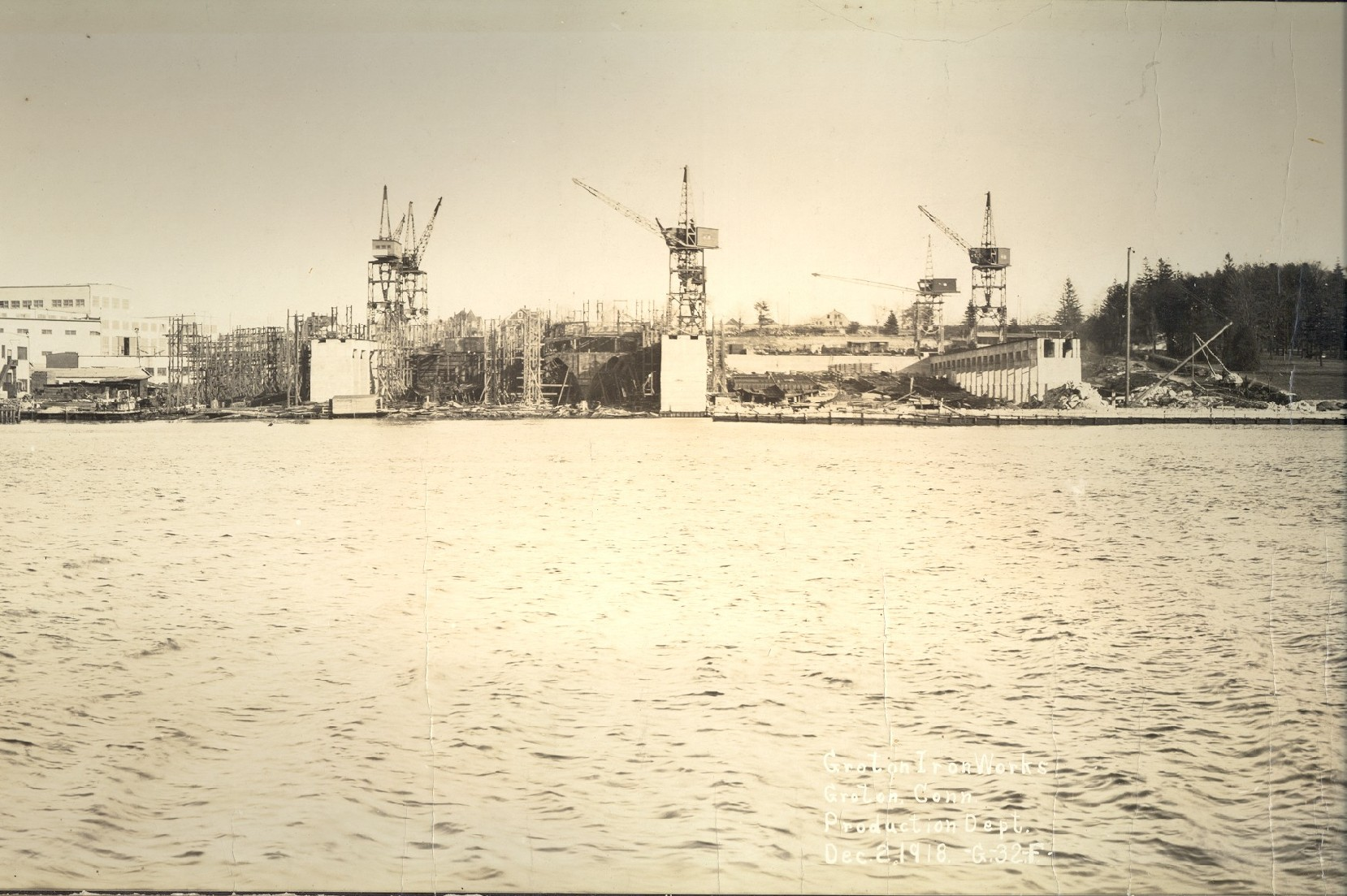
Groton Iron Works, DEC 1918

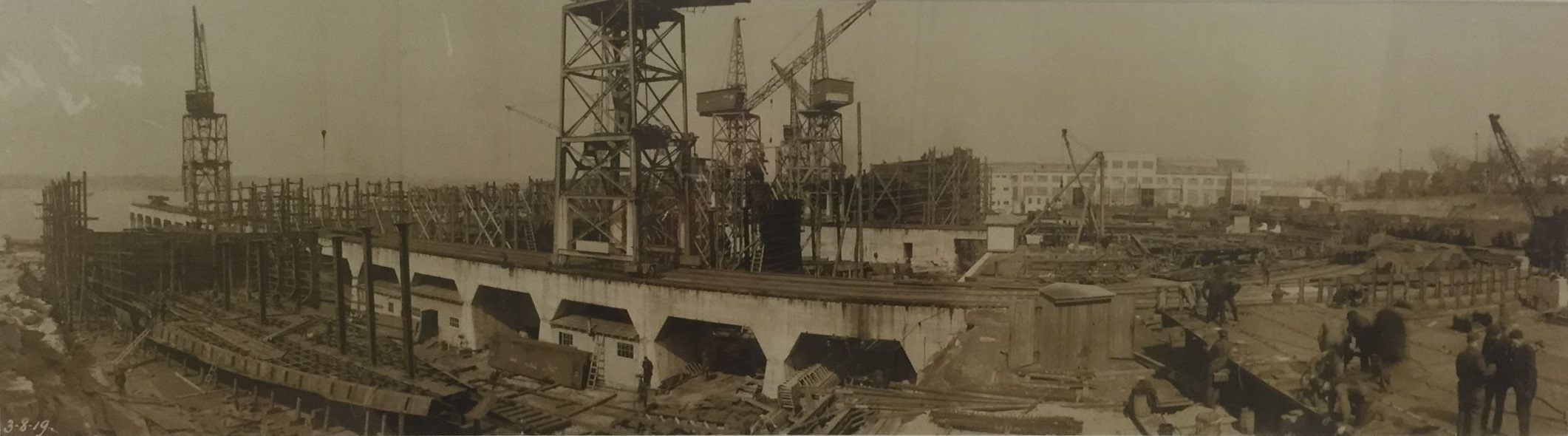
Groton Iron Works, MAR 1919

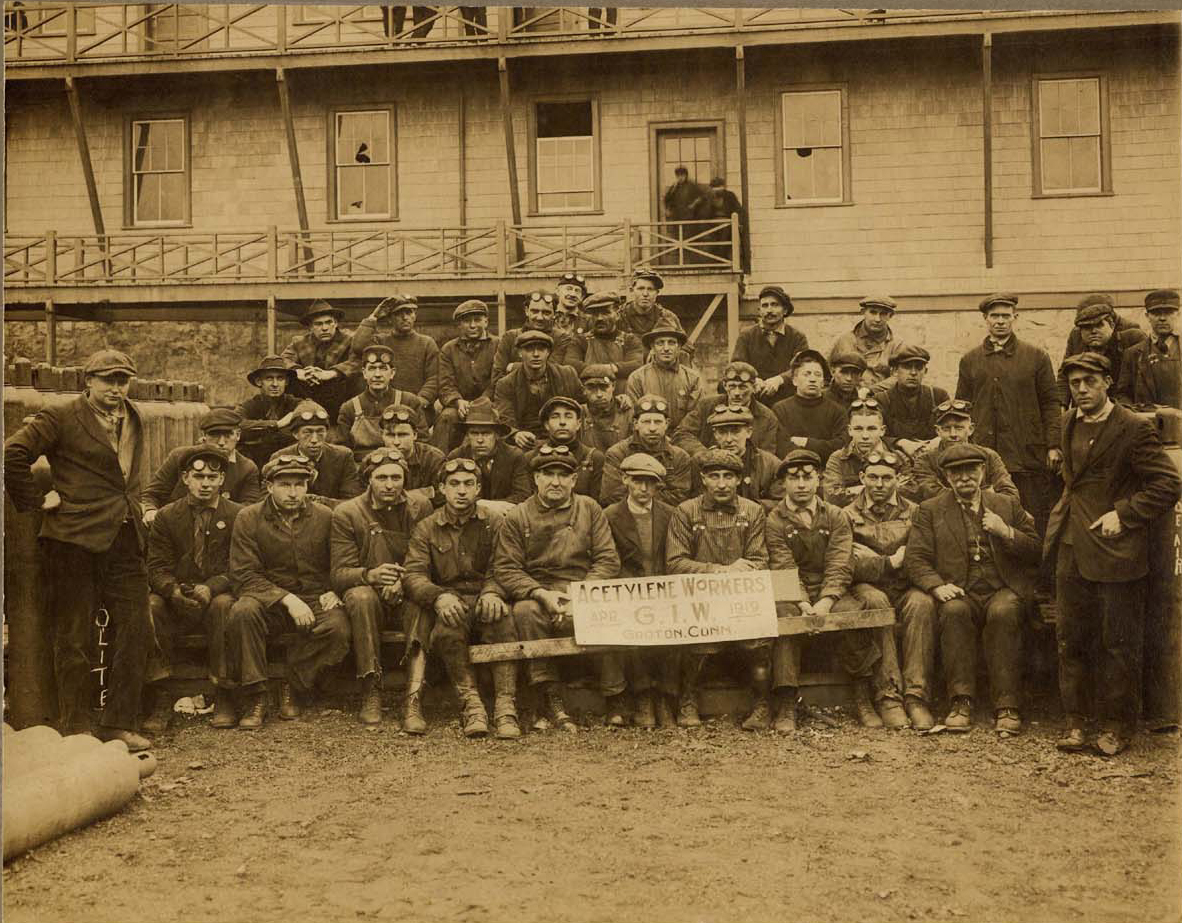
GIW Acetylene Workers, APR 1919

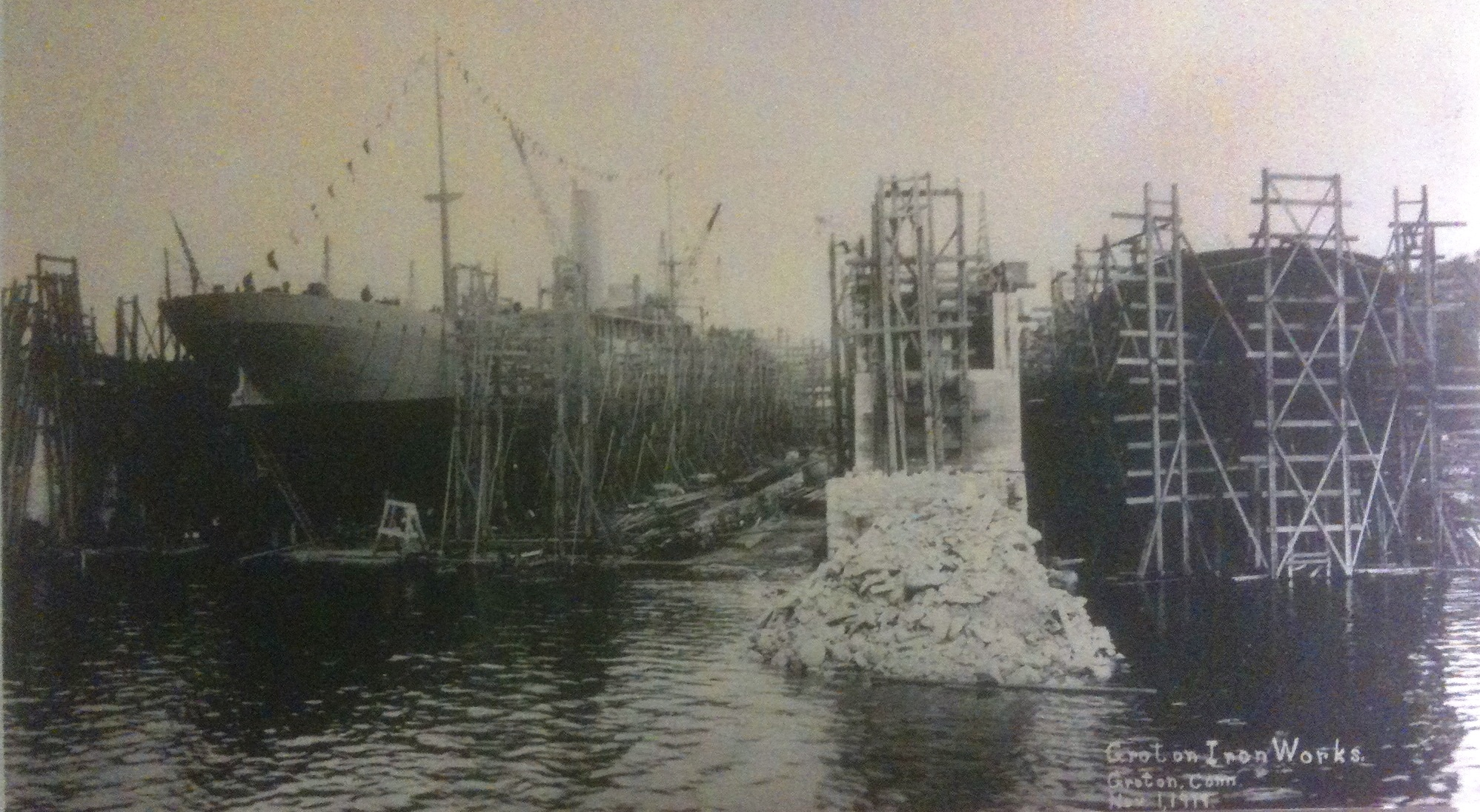
Quinnipiac Launch, NOV 1919

Groton Iron Works was a company formed in 1917 to build cargo ships for the United States Shipping Board during World War I. The company owned two shipyards: one in Noank, Connecticut for wooden ships; and the other in Groton, Connecticut for steel ships. The focus of this article is the Groton, Connecticut yard.

== Early property ownership ==
In 1916, Harry C. Rowe sold his 30-acre estate at Eastern Point to Charles W. Morse. Charles W. Morse was president of United States Steamship Company, which was the parent company of Groton Iron Works and Virginia Shipbuilding Corporation. 4,993 shares of the 5,000 total shares of Groton Iron Works stock was owned by United States Steamship Company. Qualifying shares were owned by the following: four shares by C.W. Morse and his three sons; one by Mr. Guggenheim; one by Mr. Loft; one unknown. $3,500,000 was spent to construct Groton Iron Works, which employed 3,600 men.

== Groton Iron Works officers ==
E.A. Morse, President

H.F. Morse, Vice President

B.W. Morse, Secretary

== Steel cargo ship contracts ==
Emergency Fleet Corporation contract #57 S.C. for six 8,800 dead-weight ton steamers was signed 11 August 1917.

Emergency Fleet Corporation contract #225 S.C. for six 9,400 dead-weight ton steamers was signed 20 April 1918. Three were eventually canceled due to the end of the war.

== Cargo ships built in Groton ==
Contract #	GIW Hull #	EFC Hull #	Name	Keel Laid	Launched	Delivered
57	1	372	Tollard	28 January 1918	9 November 1918	24 April 1919
57	2	373	Nameaug		8 July 1919	22 August 1919
57	3	374	Worcester		5 April 1919	30 June 1919
57	4	375	Quinnipiac		1 November 1919	12 December 1919
57	5	376	Merry Mount		20 September 1919	18 October 1919
57	6	377	Hartford		29 November 1919	31 December 1919
225	7	1542	Honnedaga		27 March 1920	July, 1920
225	8	1543	Provincetown		19 June 1920	September, 1920
225	9	1544	Hopatcong			December, 1920

== Subsequent property uses ==
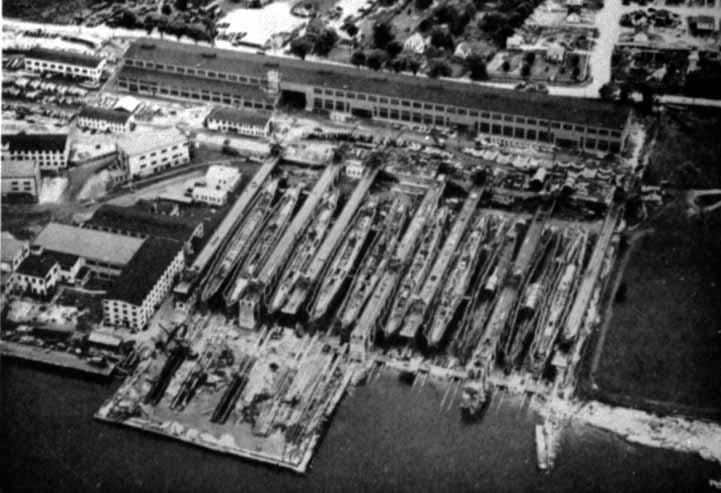
The yard in 1943

On 23 July 1922, the New York, New Haven and Hartford Railroad leased the property for use as a locomotive repair facility.

On 30 January 1926, Hickman Sea Sled announced the lease of the jointer shop building.

On 25 January 1927, Atlantic Coast Fisheries purchased the northern section of the property from Boston Iron and Metal Company, to fillet, freeze and package haddock. In 1929 they purchased the remaining property, then sold some to Shell Oil Company for the construction of a distributing center with seven tanks.

In January, 1941, a syndicate headed by Alfred Holter purchased most of the property, intending to build freighters for Britain. Purchase price was $550,000 cash.

On 5 February 1942, the US Navy purchased the property from Alfred Holter and Shell Oil Company for $222,000 using condemnation proceedings. $9.5 million was spent to construct the Victory Yard, where the Electric Boat Company began building submarines on 22 July 1942. On 3 November 1943 a Federal Court Committee awarded an additional $203,000 to the former owners.

On 13 January 1945, Electric Boat announced that $3,000,000 will be spent to convert the Victory Yard to manufacture 105mm shells.

On 18 December 1946, Pfizer Inc purchased the property from the War Assets Administration. Purchase price was $911,999.
