= USS Dorado (SS-248) =

Submarine of the United States

Coordinates: 12°21′N 78°50′W

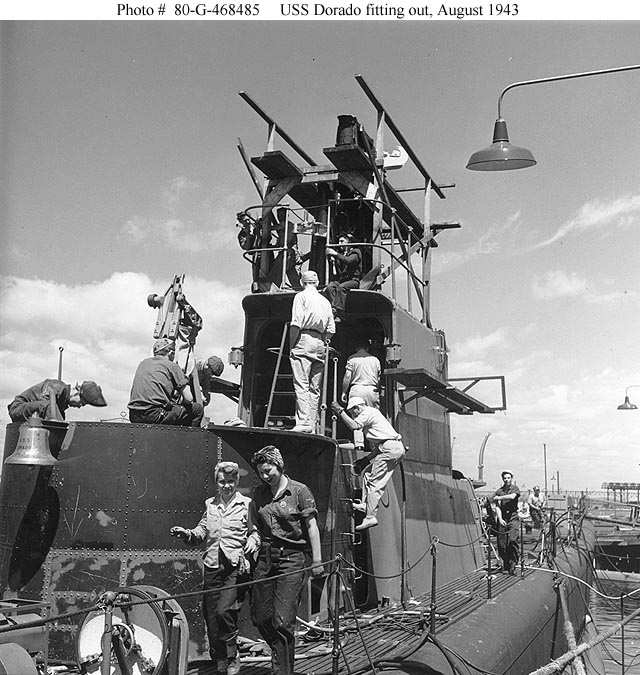
- Dorado fitting out, the final stage of construction, in August 1943.

History

United States
- Builder: Electric Boat, Groton, Connecticut
- Laid down: 27 August 1942
- Launched: 23 May 1943
- Sponsored by: Mrs. Ezra G. Allen
- Commissioned: 28 August 1943
- Fate: Missing after 6 October 1943; Possibly sunk off Panama 12 October 1943

General characteristics
- Class & type: Gato-class diesel-electric submarine
- Displacement: 1,525 long tons (1,549 t) surfaced, 2,424 long tons (2,463 t) submerged
- Length: 311 ft 9 in (95.02 m)
- Beam: 27 ft 3 in (8.31 m)
- Draft: 17 ft (5.2 m) maximum
- Propulsion: 4 × General Motors Model 16-248 V16 Diesel engines driving electric generators; 2 × 126-cell Sargo batteries; 4 × high-speed General Electric electric motors with reduction gears; two propellers; 5,400 shp (4.0 MW) surfaced; 2,740 shp (2.0 MW) submerged
- Speed: 21 kn (39 km/h) surfaced, 9 kn (17 km/h) submerged
- Range: 11,000 nmi (20,000 km) surfaced @ 10 kn (19 km/h)
- Endurance: 48 hours @ 2 kn (3.7 km/h) submerged, 75 days on patrol
- Test depth: 300 ft (91 m)
- Complement: 6 officers, 54 enlisted
- Armament: 10 × 21-inch (533 mm) torpedo tubes; 6 forward, 4 aft; 24 torpedoes; 1 × 3-inch (76 mm) / 50 caliber deck gun; Bofors 40 mm and Oerlikon 20 mm cannon

USS Dorado (SS-248), a Gato-class submarine, was the first submarine of the United States Navy to be named for the dorado.

== Construction and commissioning ==
Dorado′s keel was laid down on 27 August 1942 by the Electric Boat Company of Groton, Connecticut. She was launched on 23 May 1943, sponsored by Mrs. Ezra G. Allen, wife of Rear Admiral Ezra G. Allen, Budget Officer of the United States Department of the Navy, and commissioned on 28 August 1943.

== Service history ==
Dorado's sea trials proved the readiness of the crew, and she sailed from Naval Submarine Base New London in Groton, Connecticut, on 6 October 1943 for the Panama Canal Zone. She did not arrive.

The standard practice of imposing bombing restrictions within an area 50 nautical miles (93 km; 58 mi) ahead, 100 nmi (185 km; 115 mi) astern, and 15 nmi (28 km; 17 mi) on each side of the scheduled position of an unescorted submarine making passage in friendly waters had been carried out and all concerned had been notified. However, the crew of 210-P-9, a PBM Mariner flying boat of Patrol Squadron 210 (VP-210) based at Guantanamo Bay Naval Base in Guantánamo Bay, Cuba, assigned to provide air coverage on the evening of 12 October 1943 had received an incorrect description of the restriction area, 31 nmi (57 km; 36 mi) out of place.

At 2051 local time, under a moonlit but stormy sky, that plane attacked an unidentified submarine that it believed was outside the restriction area with three Mark-47 depth charges and a 100 lb (45 kg) Mark-4 Mod-4 demolition bomb. The visual sighting had been very short, only just a few seconds, but the aircraft crew were initially confident that it was a German U-boat. The fall of the ordnance was not observed, as it was behind the aircraft upon impact with the water, and the drone of the aircraft engines drowned out any noise from the ordnance detonations. However, the aircraft crew and the subsequent investigation board members were confident that at least two of the depth charges would have detonated.

The aircraft commander immediately put the aircraft into a tight left turn with the intent to circle back around and re-attack. They arrived over the attack datum point one minute later and dropped a yellow flare. All that could be seen was a large patch of white disturbed water and bubbles. No wreckage or oil slick was observed. The aircraft took no further action and continued on patrol. At 9:50 pm local the crew of 210-P-9, having earlier reported their attack, received a message warning them that a friendly submarine was in the area.

Unbeknownst to anyone, German submarine U-214 was in the same general vicinity and actually sighted the yellow flare ahead and to the left of their position, off in the distance. They noted it in their log and continued on their route back to Germany.

At 10:33 pm local time, 210-P-9 gained radar contact on a second submarine. Now cautious, the crew of 210-P-9 attempted to exchange recognition signals. This second submarine fired upon the plane, forcing it to veer off, then immediately dived. This incident is noted in the log of U-214, proving that the second attack was on them. Neither the aircraft nor the U-boat was damaged in this incident.

The convoy scheduled to pass through the restricted area surrounding Dorado on the evening of 12 October 1943 reported no contact.

== Mine strike theory ==
U-214 had been on a mission to lay a minefield of 15 type SMA mines off the Caribbean entrance to the Panama Canal. She successfully completed that mission on 08 October 1943 before heading for home. It has been theorized that Dorado struck one of these mines and sank. However, recent research shows that this is very unlikely. The mine field was laid in a west to east line approximately 5 nautical miles (9.3 km; 5.8 mi) north of the entrance of the canal. The final navigation waypoint of Dorado was 8 nautical miles (15 km; 9.2 mi) to the north of this line. She was to rendezvous with a U.S. warship which was to escort her on the surface beyond that point. Furthermore, the mine field had already been discovered and was in the process of being swept by 14 October, the date of the rendezvous. 10 of the 15 mines were eventually swept or accounted for. The rest either sank without deploying or broke free from their cables. Any mines that may have broken free and drifted would have traveled east-northeast on the prevailing current and out of the path of the submarine. Therefore there were none left for Dorado to strike. This makes the theory of Dorado's loss to a mine strike very unlikely.

== Aftermath of the 12 October 1943 incident ==
- 14 October 1943. Dorado does not arrive at her scheduled rendezvous point 15 nautical miles (28 km; 17 mi) north of the Cristobal Breakwater. There she was to rendezvous with a U.S. warship and be escorted on the surface into Submarine Base Coco Solo, Panama. Searches all along her plotted track in the Caribbean are launched, but nothing is found.
- 15 October 1943. A Board of Investigation (BOI) is initiated at Naval Operating Base Guantanamo, the operating base of VP-210 and aircraft 210-P-9.
- 24 October 1943. With no hope remaining that Dorado would be found, the U.S. Navy officially declares her overdue and presumed lost.
- 26 October 1943. On the same day that the BOI is concluded, a full scale formal Court of Inquiry (COI) is launched by the Navy Department in Washington under the auspices of the Chief of Naval Operations, Fleet Admiral Ernest J. King. The two investigative bodies come to different conclusions. The BOI concludes that both submarine sightings on the night of 12 October 1943 were the same submarine and that it was a U-boat. The COI concludes that "it is highly probable that USS DORADO was lost through the attack by plane No. 210-P-9." The COI, while not faulting the actions of the crew of 210-P-9, also found that they had not been properly trained in the identification of German or U.S. submarines, or in submarine sanctuary zone operating doctrine.

== Conclusions from information in the official inquiries ==
- No other U.S. submarine was in the central Caribbean on the night of 12 October 1943, and the only German U-boat within 800 nautical miles (1,500 km; 920 mi) was U-214.
- The first attack by 210-P-9 was not on U-214, but the second certainly was.
- Dorado, based on her navigation orders, was in the central Caribbean on the night of 12 October 1943.
- Dorado did not strike one of the mines laid by U-214 near the entrance of the Panama Canal.

Therefore it is likely that Dorado was lost as a result of the attack by 210-P-9 on the night of 12 October 1943 and sank in the vicinity of the attack.

There are other possible explanations for Dorado's loss. Those include weather and a torpedo attack by a German U-boat. Examination of U.S. and German records definitively rule out these two causes. Another explanation is a mechanical failure or an operational accident. While these remain possibilities, their probability is low due to the fact that Dorado was a brand new submarine at the time.

Dorado was one of only two U.S. Navy submarines lost in the Atlantic theater during World War II. The other was USS R-12, which sank during a training dive near Key West, Florida.

== Legacy ==
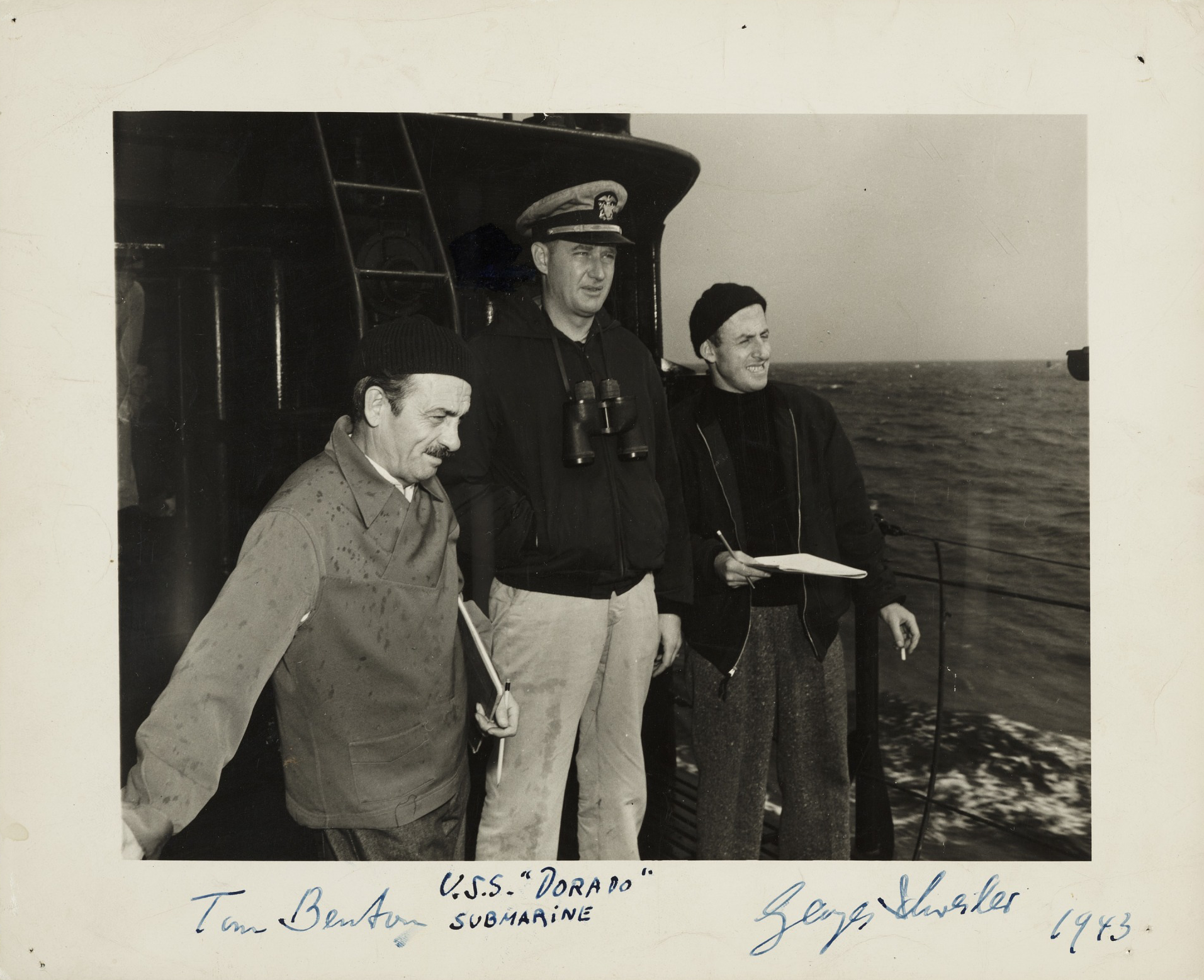
Artists Thomas Hart Benton and Georges Schreiber with Dorado′s commanding officer Earle Caffrey Schneider on the deck of USS Dorado in the summer of 1943.

A memorial to Dorado stands on the Arkansas River in Veterans Memorial Park in Wichita, Kansas.

A 614-page book entitled USS Dorado (SS-248): On Eternal Patrol was published by Douglas E. Campbell in November 2011.

Before she was lost, the American painter Thomas Hart Benton sailed aboard Dorado on her shakedown cruise, using that experience as the basis for his paintings Score Another for the Subs, In Slumber Deep, and The Claustrophobic Confines.

== See also ==
- French submarine Surcouf a French submarine sunk in the same area under similar circumstances
