= USS Croaker =

Submarine of the United States

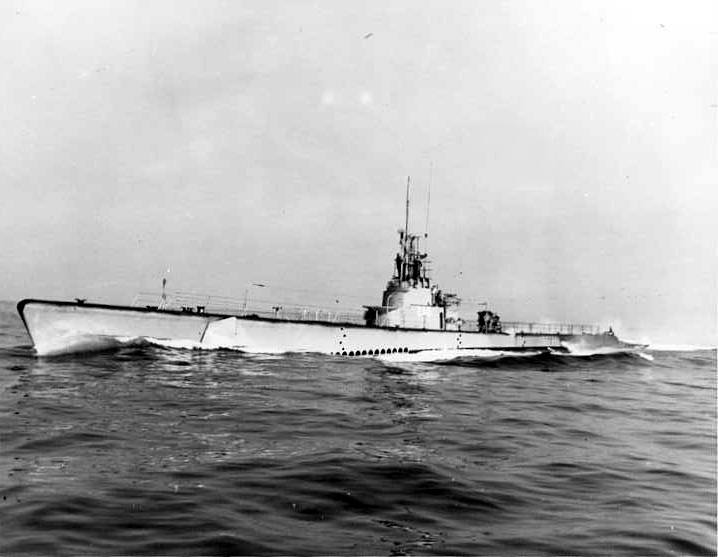
- Croaker (SS-246), underway, c. 1944–45.

History

United States
- Name: Croaker
- Namesake: Croaker, Fish
- Builder: General Dynamics Electric Boat, Groton, Connecticut
- Laid down: 1 April 1943
- Launched: 19 December 1943
- Sponsored by: Mrs. W. H. P. Blandy
- Commissioned: 21 April 1944
- Decommissioned: 15 June 1946
- Recommissioned: 7 May 1951
- Decommissioned: 18 March 1953
- Recommissioned: 11 December 1953
- Decommissioned: 2 April 1968
- Stricken: 20 December 1971
- Status: Museum ship at Groton, Connecticut on 27 June 1976, then to Buffalo, New York since 1988.
- Badge

General characteristics
- Class & type: Gato-class diesel-electric submarine
- Displacement: 1,525 tons (1,549 t) surfaced, 2,424 tons (2,460 t) submerged
- Length: 311 ft 9 in (95.02 m)
- Beam: 27 ft 3 in (8.31 m)
- Draft: 17 ft (5.2 m) maximum
- Propulsion: 4 × General Motors Model 16-248 V16 Diesel engines driving electric generators; 2 × 126-cell Sargo batteries; 4 × high-speed General Electric electric motors with reduction gears; two propellers; 5,400 shp (4.0 MW) surfaced; 2,740 shp (2.0 MW) submerged
- Speed: 21 kn (39 km/h) surfaced, 9 kn (17 km/h) submerged
- Range: 11,000 nmi (20,000 km) surfaced @ 10 kn (19 km/h)
- Endurance: 48 hours @ 2 kn (3.7 km/h) submerged, 75 days on patrol
- Test depth: 300 ft (91 m)
- Complement: 6 officers, 54 enlisted
- Armament: 10 × 21-inch (533 mm) torpedo tubes; 6 forward, 4 aft; 24 torpedoes; 1 × 3-inch (76 mm) / 50 caliber deck gun; Bofors 40 mm and Oerlikon 20 mm cannon
- USS Croaker
- U.S. National Register of Historic Places
- New York State Register of Historic Places
- Location within New York
- Location: Buffalo and Erie County Naval & Military Park, Buffalo, New York
- Coordinates: 42°52′42″N 78°52′54″W
- NRHP reference No.: 08000863
- NYSRHP No.: 02940.024293

Significant dates
- Added to NRHP: 12 September 2008
- Designated NYSRHP: 3 July 2008

USS Croaker (SS/SSK/AGSS/IXSS-246), a Gato-class submarine, was the first ship of the United States Navy to be named for the croaker, any of various fishes which make throbbing or drumming noises.

== Construction and commissioning ==
Croaker′s keel was laid down on 1 April 1943 by Electric Boat Company in Groton, Connecticut. She was launched on 19 December 1943, sponsored by the wife of Admiral William H. P. Blandy, and commissioned on 21 April 1944, with Commander John E. Lee in command.

== Service history ==
=== World War II ===
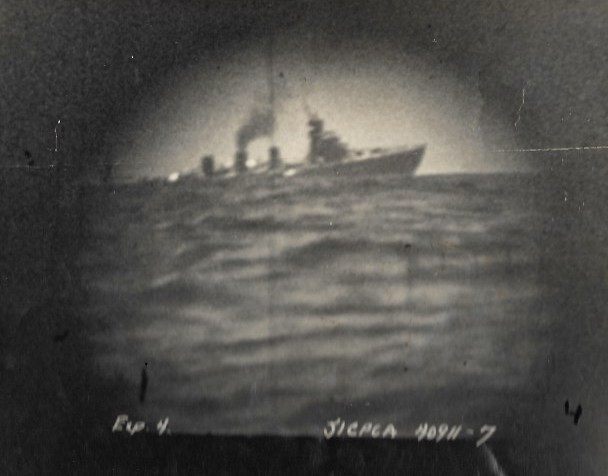
Periscope view from Croaker of Nagara sinking, 7 August 1944

Croaker arrived at Pearl Harbor from New London on 26 June 1944, and on 19 July put to sea on her first war patrol, sailing to the East China and Yellow Seas. In a series of brilliantly successful attacks which won her the Navy Unit Commendation, she sank the cruiser Nagara on 7 August, an auxiliary minesweeper, Taito Maru, on 16 August, and two freighters, Daigen Maru No. 7 on 14 August and Yamateru Maru on 17 August. During this patrol, she served as lifeguard during air strikes on the Bonin Islands. She refitted at Midway Atoll from 31 August to 23 September, when she sailed in a coordinated attack group for the same area on her second war patrol. Again successful, she sank the freighters Shinki Maru on 9 October, and Hakuran Maru on 23 October. She shadowed a convoy on 23–24 October, sank the freighter Mikage Maru, and damaged Gassan Maru with her last torpedo. Tubes empty, she returned to Midway to fuel, and pushed on to Pearl Harbor, arriving for refit on 10 November.

Croaker's third war patrol, in the Luzon Straits and South China Sea from 13 December 1944 to 12 February 1945, found her making no contacts with enemy shipping, but providing essential lifeguard service during strikes on Luzon preparatory to the invasion landings in Lingayen Gulf. She refitted at Fremantle, Australia, and on 12 March sailed for a patrol off the coast of Indo-China twice interrupted by the need to return to Australia for repairs. She refitted at Subic Bay, Philippines from 22 April to 15 May, then sailed for her fifth war patrol, in the Java Sea. On 30 May, she attacked a convoy of three small oilers guarded by an escort, with unconfirmed results, and on 5 June returned to Fremantle. Her final war patrol – from 1 July to 13 August – found her assigned to lifeguard duties in the South China Sea and off Hong Kong as the final series of air attacks on Japan were carried out.

Returning to Subic Bay, Croaker sailed for Saipan and continued on to Galveston, Tex., and New London, where she was then decommissioned and placed in reserve 15 May 1946 in the Atlantic Reserve Fleet.

=== Post-War ===
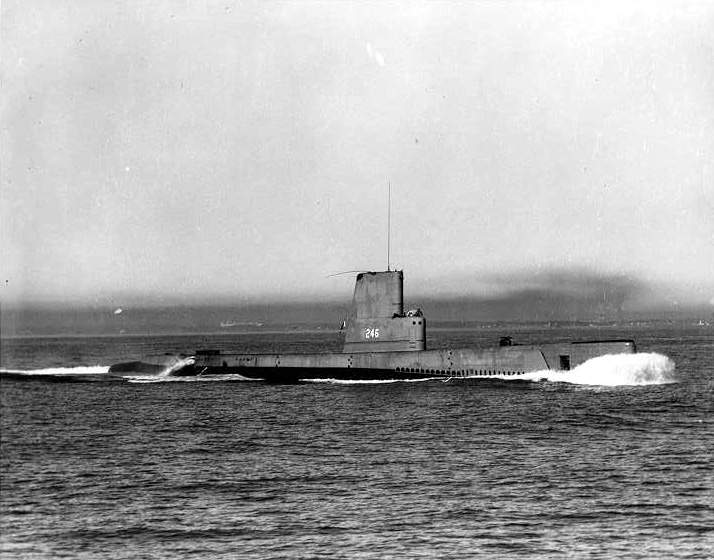
Croaker (SSK-246) underway in hunter-killer configuration, c. mid-1950s.

Recommissioned on 7 May 1951, she served as schoolship out of New London until 18 March 1953, when she was again decommissioned at Portsmouth Naval Shipyard for conversion to a hunter-killer submarine. She was reclassified SSK-246 on 9 April 1953, and was recommissioned on 11 December 1953. Returning to active duty in February 1954, she operated along the East Coast and in the Caribbean, visiting ports in England while taking part in NATO exercises in 1957 and 1958.

Croaker was reclassified SS-246 again in August 1959. Special submarine exercises took her to England once more in February 1960, after which she resumed local operations out of New London. In September 1960, Croaker departed on a cruise which saw her sailing through the Mediterranean and Suez Canal to call at various Near Eastern ports and Karachi, Pakistan. She returned to New London in mid-December, retracing her outward track.

She was reclassified Auxiliary Submarine AGSS-246 in May 1967. Decommissioned for the last time on 2 April 1968, Croaker was struck from the Naval Vessel Register on 20 December 1971 and reclassified Miscellaneous Unclassified Submarine IXSS-246 in December 1971. From 1977 to 1987, Croaker was displayed as a private attraction in Groton, Connecticut by the Submarine Memorial Association until the Navy revoked its agreement with the group citing a requirement for historical preservation of the vessel. Since 1988, Croaker has served as a museum ship at the Buffalo and Erie County Naval & Military Park in Buffalo, New York.

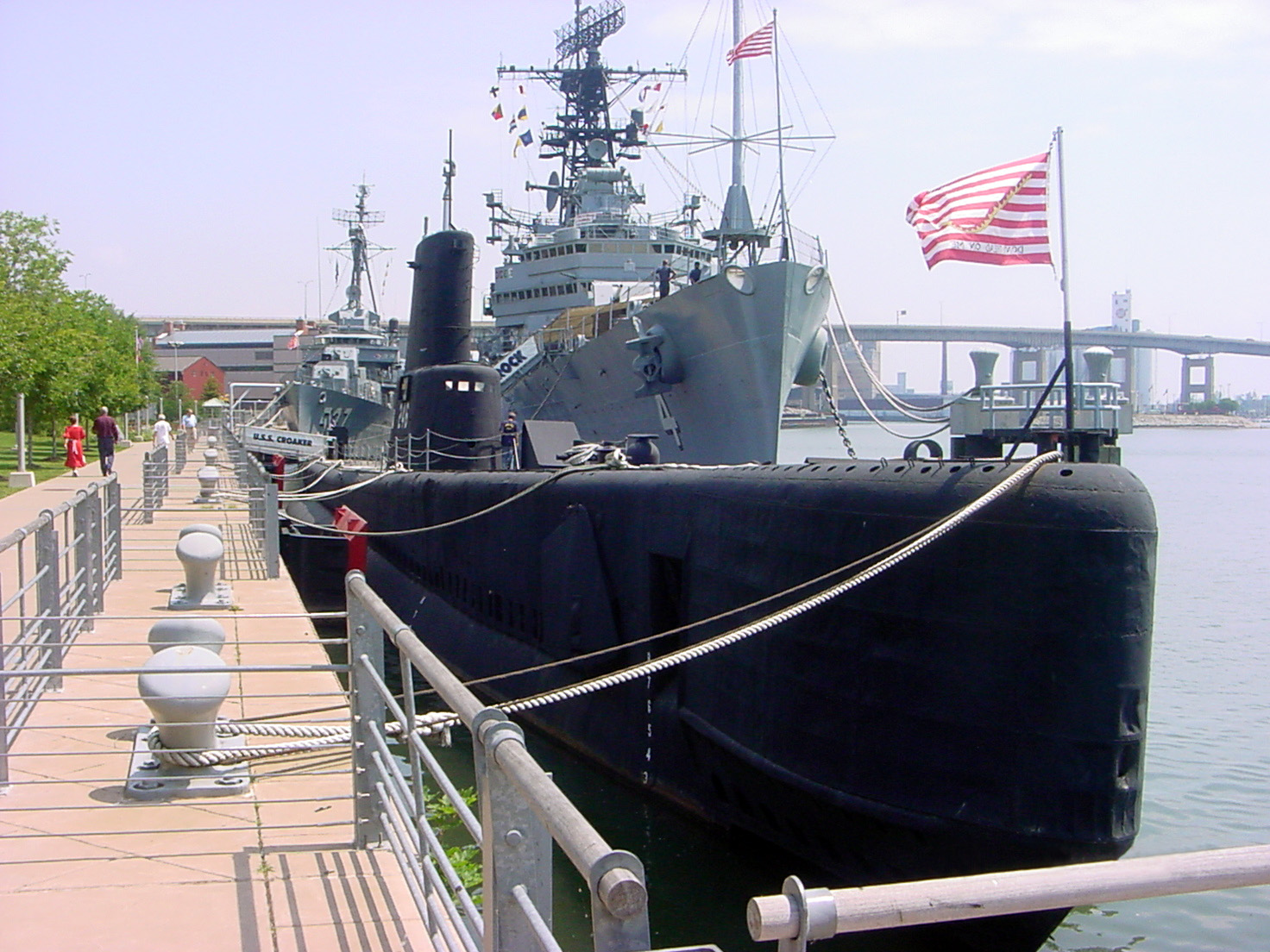
U.S.S. Croaker at the Buffalo and Erie County Naval & Military Park

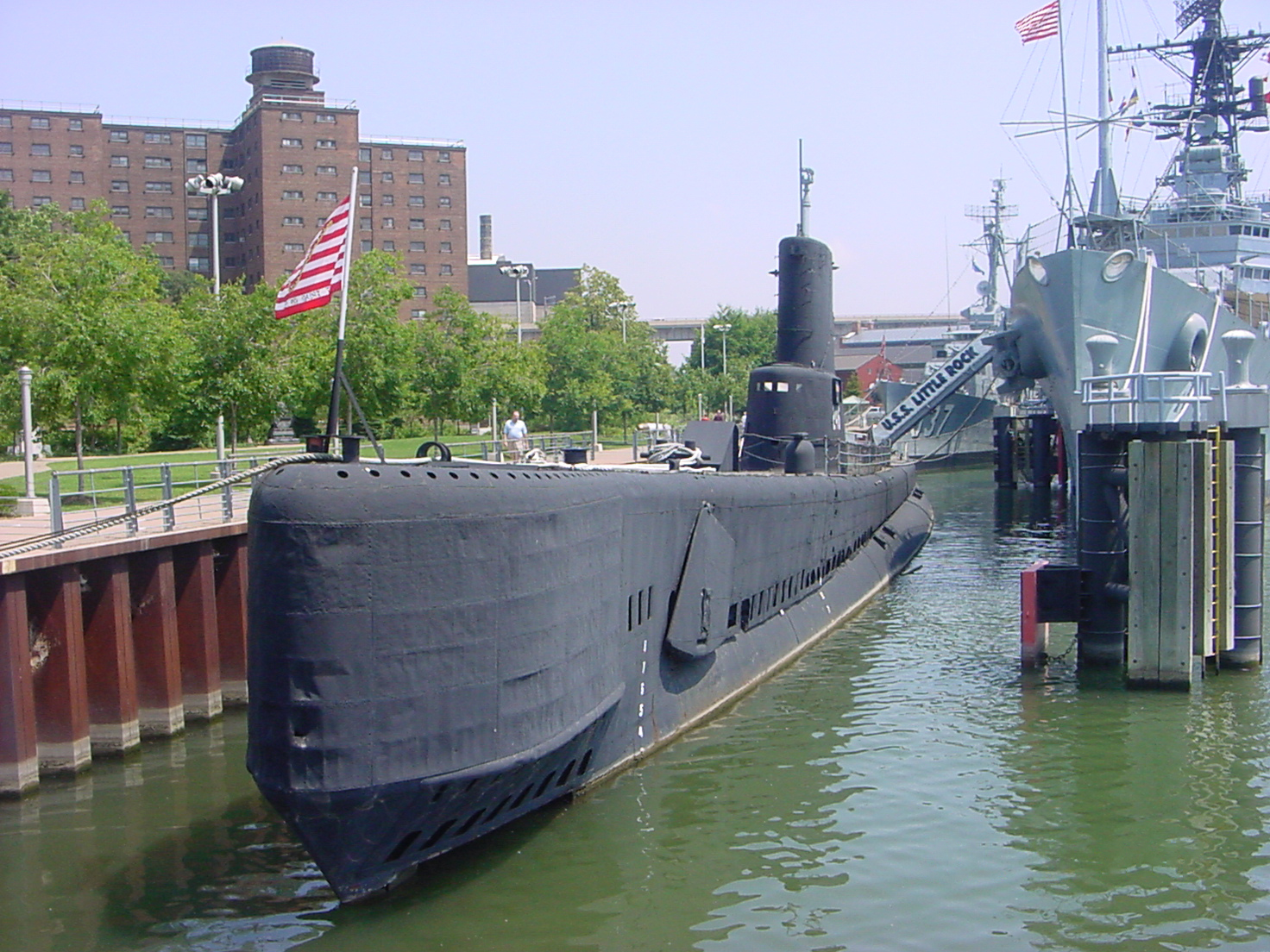

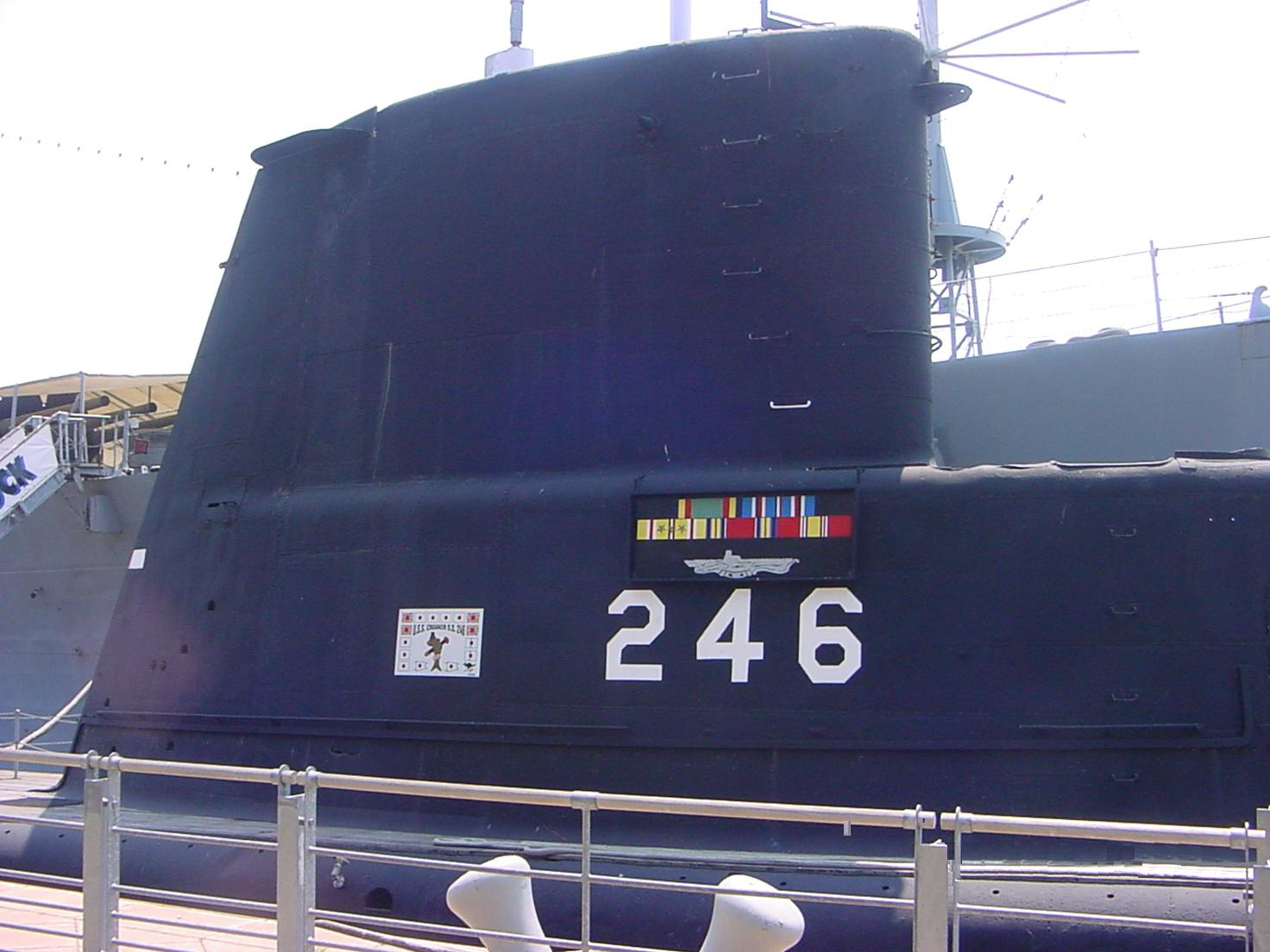

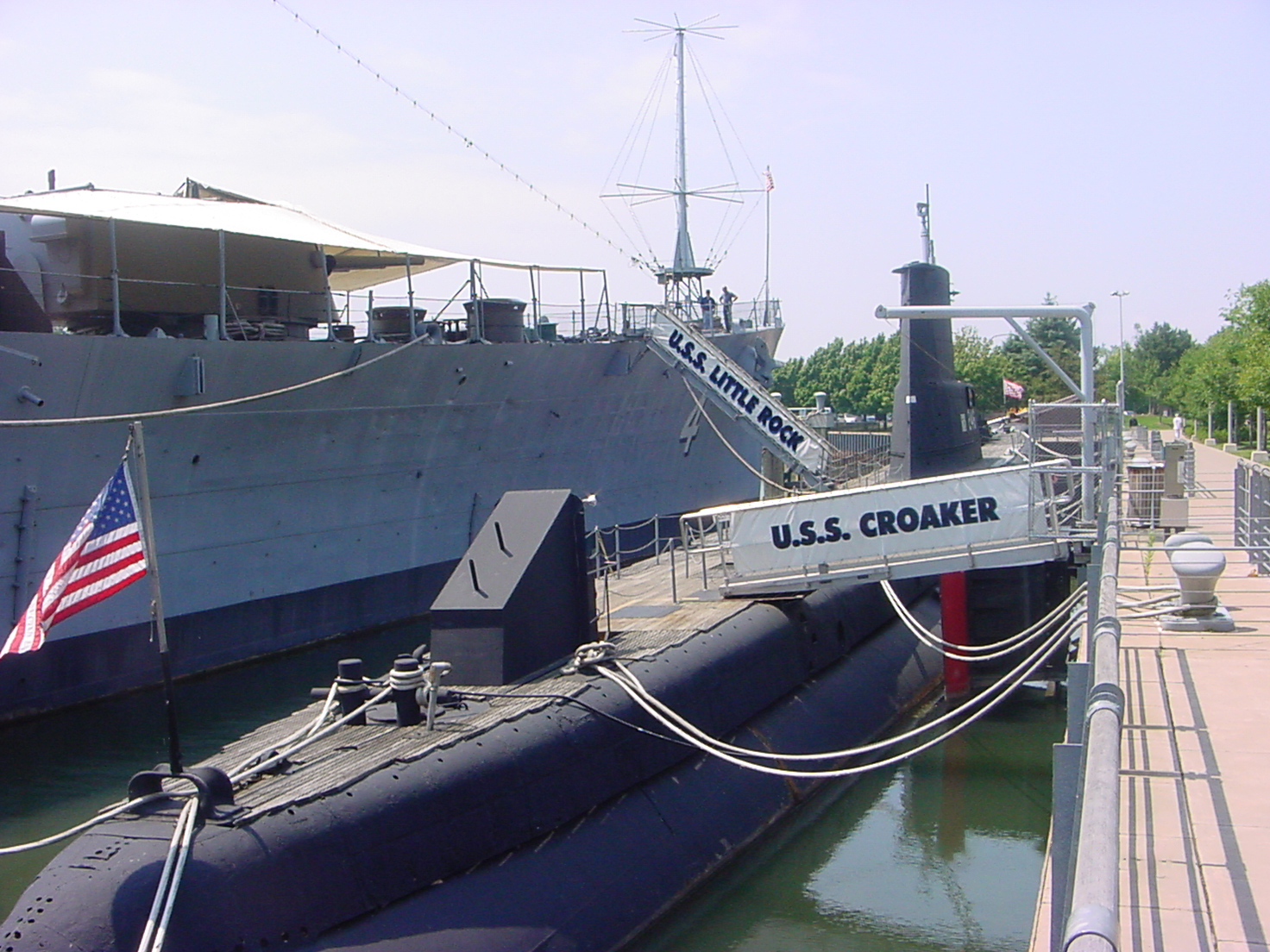

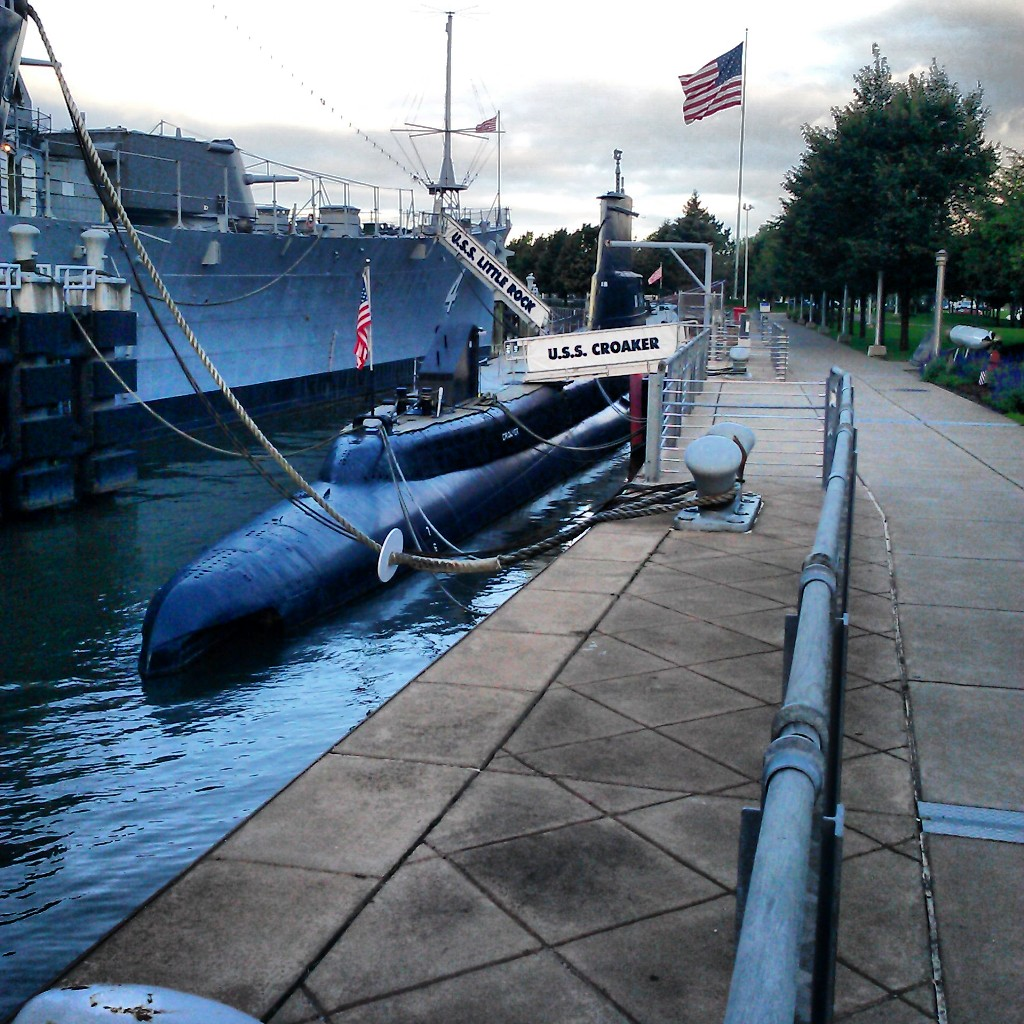

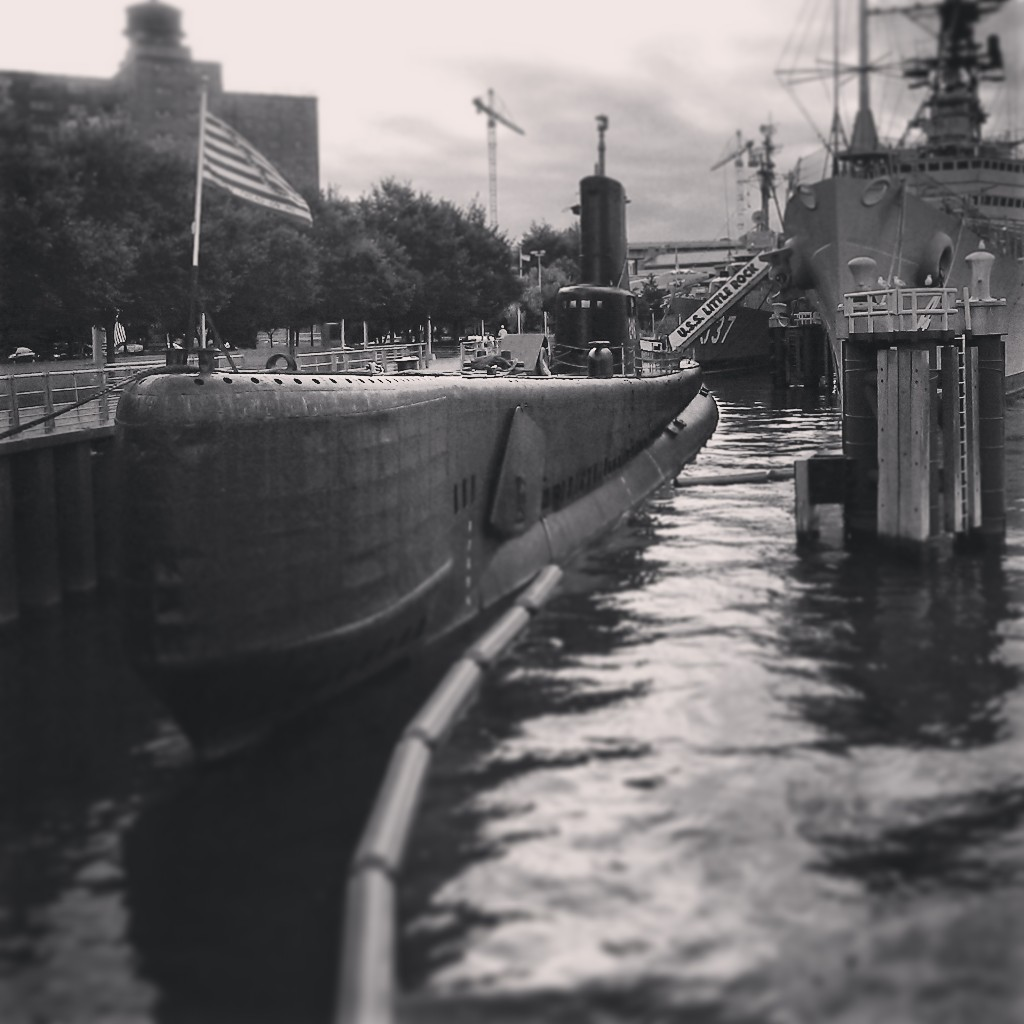

== Awards ==
- Navy Unit Commendation
- American Campaign Medal
- Asiatic-Pacific Campaign Medal with three battle stars
- World War II Victory Medal
- National Defense Service Medal with star

Along with the Navy Unit Commendation, Croaker received three battle stars for those of her war patrols designated as "successful": the first, second, and fifth of her six. She is credited with having sunk 19,710 tons of shipping.

Croaker was listed on the National Register of Historic Places on 12 September 2008.

== See also ==
- Gato-class submarine#Hunter-killer - details of SSK conversion
- Attack submarine - discusses origins of SSK program
