= Japanese submarine I-176 =

World War II submarine

History

Empire of Japan
- Name: I-176
- Ordered: 1939
- Builder: Kure Naval Arsenal
- Laid down: 22 June 1940
- Launched: 7 June 1941
- Commissioned: 4 August 1942
- Fate: Sunk 16 May 1944

General characteristics
- Class & type: Kaidai type, KD7-class
- Displacement: 1,630 long tons (1,656 t) surfaced; 2,602 long tons (2,644 t) submerged
- Length: 105.5 m (346 ft)
- Beam: 8.25 m (27.1 ft)
- Draft: 4.6 m (15 ft)
- Propulsion: 2 × Kampon Mk.1B Model 8 diesels, 2 shafts; 8,000 bhp; Electric motors: 1,800 shp
- Speed: 23.1 knots (42.8 km/h; 26.6 mph) surfaced; 8 knots (15 km/h; 9.2 mph) submerged
- Range: 8,000 nmi (15,000 km; 9,200 mi) at 16 knots (30 km/h; 18 mph) surfaced; 50 nmi (93 km; 58 mi) at 5 knots (9.3 km/h; 5.8 mph) submerged
- Test depth: 80 m (260 ft)
- Complement: 86
- Armament: 6 × 533 mm forward torpedo tubes; 12 × Type 95 torpedoes; 1 × 120 mm (4.7 in) 11th Year Type Naval gun; 2 × Type 96 25mm AA guns

The Japanese submarine I-176 (I-76, until 20 May 1942) was a "Kaidai" type of cruiser submarine active in World War II. A KD7 sub-class boat, I-176 was built for the Imperial Japanese Navy (IJN) in the early 1940s.

The most successful submarine of her class, she severely damaged the heavy cruiser USS Chester in October 1942 and sank the submarine USS Corvina in November 1943, the only Japanese submarine to sink one of her American counterparts. I-176 was sunk in May 1944 in the western Pacific by the American destroyers Franks, Haggard and Johnston.

== Service ==
I-176 was ordered in 1939 but construction did not begin until 1941 at the Kure Naval Arsenal in Hiroshima Prefecture. On completion in 1942 the vessel was renamed from I-76 to I-176 and was sent initially to Truk in September 1942. On October 13, an American carrier group was sighted off the Solomon Islands. Japanese submarines in the area, including the I-176, were ordered to travel north to carry out an attack but the I-176 was the only Japanese vessel to successfully engage one of the US vessels. She attacked USS Chester (CA-27) on October 20, 1942, at 13°31′S 163°17′E some 120 miles (190 km) southeast of the island of Makira (then known as San Cristobal). The cruiser was badly damaged, suffering 11 killed and 12 wounded. After returning to Sydney, Australia, to carry out repairs, Chester had to withdraw to Norfolk, Virginia, for repairs which kept her out of the war until September 1943.

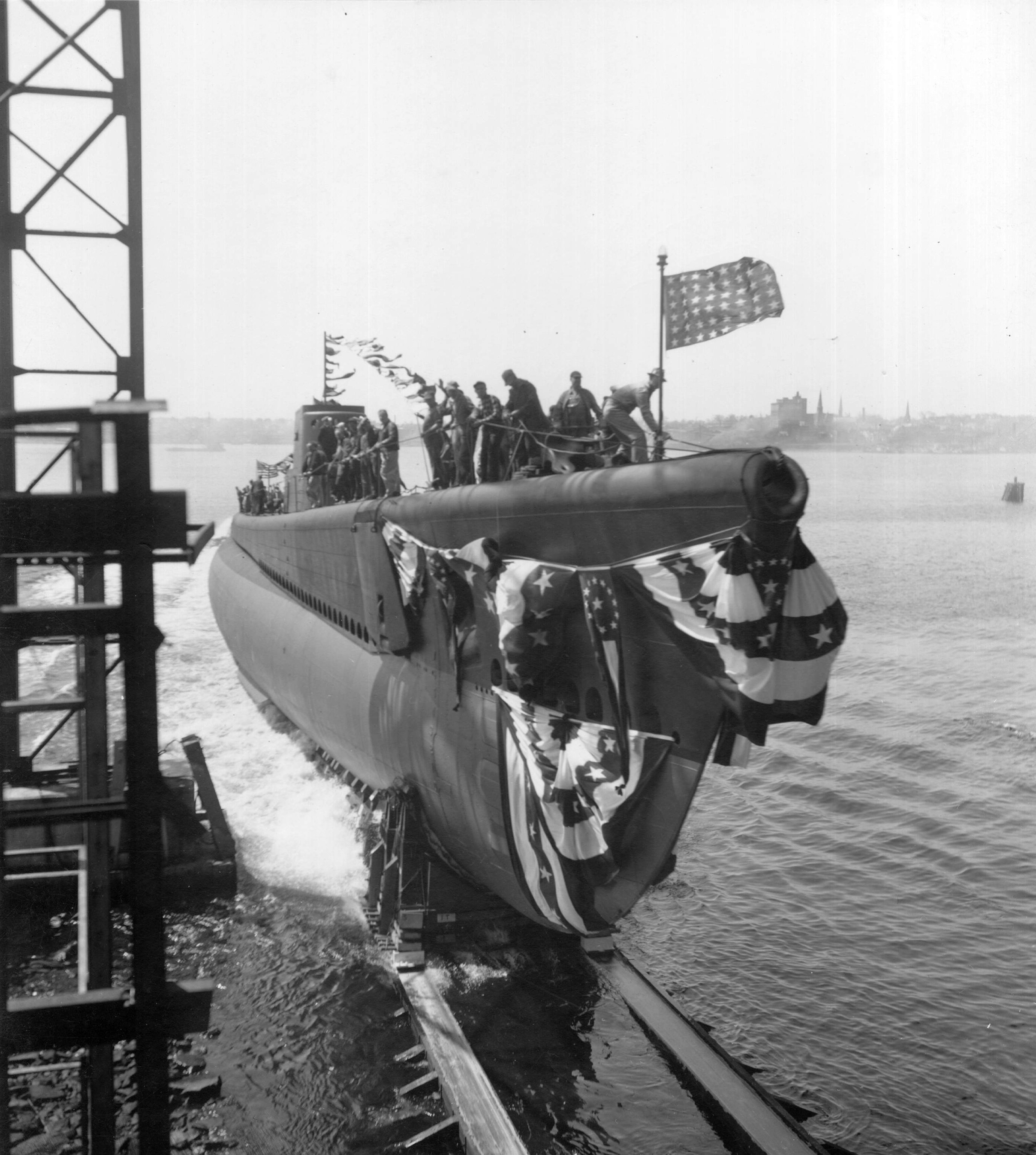
USS Corvina, sunk by I-176 on November 16, 1943

I-176 was subsequently converted to a transport role, with her 120 mm (4.7 in) gun being removed and fittings for a landing craft being added. She was ordered to Guadalcanal, where she successfully carried out the first submarine resupply operation of the Japanese garrison on the island in December 1942. A second supply mission the following month failed. In March 1943 I-176 narrowly avoided destruction when she was attacked at Lae, Papua New Guinea by US B-25 Mitchell bombers while unloading supplies. Her commander, Yahachi Tanabe, was wounded by machine-gun fire from the bombers and had to relinquish command a few days later.

After several months of repairs in Japan, I-176 returned to Lae, Sio and Finschhafen in New Guinea to carry out a number of successful supply runs between July and October 1943. The submarine was ordered to Truk in November 1943 but her instructions were intercepted by US signals intelligence. Several American submarines in the Truk area were informed that a Japanese submarine was in the vicinity. A message from I-176 was intercepted which reported that the vessel had "Received direct torpedo hit en route to Truk, no damage". It had presumably been attacked by an American submarine but had escaped damage, most likely due to a defective torpedo. On November 16, the probable attacker, USS Corvina, was itself sunk by I-176. The I-176's log recorded that it had fired three torpedoes, claiming two hits which destroyed the target. The loss of the Corvina was not announced until March 14, 1944; she was the only American submarine to be sunk by a Japanese submarine in the entire war.

I-176 returned to Kure in Japan for an overhaul between the end of November 1943 and mid-March 1944. She subsequently returned to Truk in April 1944 and was despatched to Buka Island at the far western end of the Solomon Islands archipelago, where she was to undertake another supply run. She was spotted by a US patrol plane whose radio reports summoned the destroyers USS Franks (DD-554), USS Haggard (DD-555) and USS Johnston (DD-557) to the scene. On the morning of May 16, the destroyers began to comb the waters off Buka. Haggard made a sonar contact at 4°1′S 156°29′E. at 21:45 and began dropping depth charges. The other destroyers joined in, carrying out a series of depth-charge attacks that continued for several hours. The following morning, the destroyers found evidence of the destruction of I-176 – fragments of sandalwood and cork and paper marked with Japanese words. There were no survivors. I-176 was presumed lost on June 11, 1944, and was removed from the Japanese Navy List on July 10.
