= USS Blackfin =

Submarine of the United States

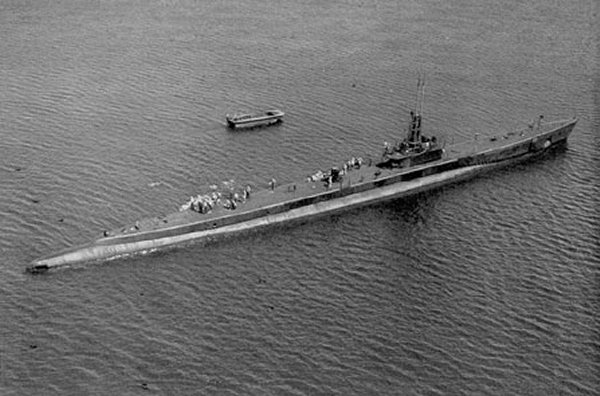
- Blackfin in 1944

History

United States
- Name: USS Blackfin
- Namesake: Blackfin cisco
- Builder: Electric Boat Company, Groton, Connecticut
- Laid down: 10 June 1943
- Launched: 12 March 1944
- Commissioned: 4 July 1944
- Decommissioned: 19 November 1948
- Recommissioned: 15 May 1951
- Decommissioned: 15 September 1972
- Stricken: 15 September 1972
- Fate: Sunk as target off San Diego, California, 13 May 1973

General characteristics (As completed)
- Class & type: Balao-class diesel-electric submarine
- Displacement: 1,526 long tons (1,550 t) surfaced; 2,424 tons (2,463 t) submerged
- Length: 311 ft 9 in (95.02 m)
- Beam: 27 ft 3 in (8.31 m)
- Draft: 16 ft 10 in (5.13 m) maximum
- Propulsion: 4 × General Motors Model 16-278A V16 diesel engines driving electrical generators; 2 × 126-cell Sargo batteries; 4 × high-speed General Electric electric motors with reduction gears; 2 × propellers; 5,400 shp (4.0 MW) surfaced; 2,740 shp (2.0 MW) submerged
- Speed: 20.25 knots (38 km/h) surfaced; 8.75 knots (16 km/h) submerged
- Range: 11,000 nautical miles (20,000 km) surfaced at 10 knots (19 km/h)
- Endurance: 48 hours at 2 knots (3.7 km/h) submerged; 75 days on patrol
- Test depth: 400 ft (120 m)
- Complement: 10 officers, 70–71 enlisted
- Armament: 10 × 21-inch (533 mm) torpedo tubes; 6 forward, 4 aft; 24 torpedoes; 1 × 5-inch (127 mm) / 25 caliber deck gun; Bofors 40 mm and Oerlikon 20 mm cannon

General characteristics (Guppy IA)
- Class & type: none
- Displacement: 1,830 tons (1,859 t) surfaced; 2,440 tons (2,479 t) submerged
- Length: 307 ft 7 in (93.75 m)
- Beam: 27 ft 4 in (8.33 m)
- Draft: 17 ft (5.2 m)
- Propulsion: Snorkel added; Batteries upgraded to Sargo II
- Speed: Surfaced: 17.3 knots (32.0 km/h) maximum; 12.5 knots (23.2 km/h) cruising; Submerged: 15.0 knots (27.8 km/h) for ½ hour; 7.5 knots (13.9 km/h) snorkeling; 3.0 knots (5.6 km/h) cruising
- Range: 17,000 nmi (31,000 km) surfaced at 11 knots (20 km/h)
- Endurance: 36 hours at 3 knots (6 km/h) submerged
- Complement: 10 officers; 5 petty officers; 64–69 enlisted men
- Armament: 10 × 21 inch (533 mm) torpedo tubes; (six forward, four aft); all guns removed

USS Blackfin (SS-322), a Balao-class submarine in commission from 1944 to 1948 and from 1951 to 1972, was a ship of the United States Navy named for the blackfin cisco.

During World War II, Blackfin completed five war patrols in the Philippine Islands, South China Sea, and Yellow Sea. She sank the Japanese destroyer Shigure, which until then was known for her legendary luck, surviving for most of the war and a number of important Japanese naval operations. Blackfin also sank a Japanese cargo ship. After World War II, Blackfin served in the United States Pacific Fleet, and saw service in the Vietnam War.

== Construction and commissioning ==
Blackfin′s keel was laid on 10 June 1943 by the Electric Boat Company at Groton, Connecticut. She was launched on 12 March 1944, sponsored by Mrs. Phyllis Irwin Lockwood, wife of Rear Admiral Charles A. Lockwood, and commissioned on 4 July 1944 with Lieutenant Commander George H. Laird, Jr., in command.

== Service history ==
=== World War II ===
==== July–September 1944 ====
After shakedown training in the waters off New London, Connecticut, Blackfin got underway to join the war in the Pacific on 14 August 1944. She transited the Panama Canal on 29 August and arrived at Pearl Harbor, Hawaii, on 11 September 1944. She spent the rest of September 1944 undergoing repairs and engaged in training in the waters of the Hawaiian Islands.

==== First war patrol ====
On 30 September 1944, Blackfin set out from Pearl Harbor on her first war patrol. She topped off her fuel tanks at Saipan in the Mariana Islands on 10 October 1944 and then continued on her way to her patrol area in the northern approaches to the Palawan Passage in the Philippine Islands.

Blackfin operated in Philippine waters as the Philippines campaign of 1944–1945 began with the U.S. invasion of Leyte on 20 October 1944, which led to the Battle of Leyte Gulf of 23–26 October 1944. She made her first contact with Japanese ships on 26 October and began an approach, but one of the Japanese ships began racing toward her and forced her to dive to evade an attack.

On the morning of 1 November 1944, Blackfin′s lookouts spotted smoke on the horizon. Shortly thereafter, a Japanese merchant ship — the 2,745-gross register ton cargo ship No. 12 Unkai Maru — with four escorts appeared on the horizon. Blackfin fired six torpedoes at No. 12 Unkai Maru and sent her to the bottom. On 3 November, Blackfin sighted a lighted Japanese ship but soon positively identified her as a hospital ship, and therefore immune from attack. On 7 November 1944, Blackfin sighted a large Japanese tanker with three escorts and attacked, observing two torpedoes hit the tanker, which was only damaged.

Blackfin continued her patrol uneventfully until she received orders on 18 November 1944 to conduct a special mission. Accordingly, on 24 November she rendezvoused off Mindoro′s northern coast with a United States Army commando team which had captured a small Japanese patrol boat carrying many current Japanese ciphers and codebooks. She picked up three bags of the classified material and proceeded south toward Morotai. Off Point Anna, she transferred the bags to the Royal Australian Navy corvette HMAS Kiama.

After parting company with Kiama, Blackfin headed for Australia. She paused briefly at Darwin in Australia's Northern Territory before concluding her patrol with her arrival at Fremantle, Western Australia, on 4 December 1944. She moored alongside the submarine tender USS Euryale (AS-22) there for a refit. Upon its completion, she carried out training activities.

==== Second war patrol ====
On 2 January 1945, Blackfin got underway for her second war patrol, assigned a patrol area in the South China Sea. Upon reaching her station off the eastern coast of the Malay Peninsula, she joined a coordinated attack group of U.S. submarines covering the area. In the early morning of 24 January 1945, she contacted a Japanese convoy consisting of a large tanker and four escorts, some of them destroyers. She soon gained position for an attack on the tanker, but shortly after she fired torpedoes from her bow torpedo tubes at it, one of the Japanese destroyers came dangerously close to Blackfin. Blackfin then attacked the destroyer, and one of her torpedoes hit it just abaft the bridge. The target, later identified as Shigure, was enveloped in a large cloud of white smoke and sank at 06°00′N 103°48′E. Until her encounter with Blackfin, Shigure had been known for her legendary luck, surviving a number of important Japanese naval operations since the beginning of the war in the Pacific in December 1941.

After torpedoing Shigure, Blackfin swung around to bring her stern torpedo tubes to bear on the tanker and scored one hit before another escort opened fire on Blackfin. Blackfin broke off her attack and cleared the area. She then reestablished contact with the convoy and later that night, while she prepared to renew her attack, she sighted a Japanese ship and an escort she had not seen before through her high periscope. She began closing in on this second group of Japanese ships to make an attack, but a Japanese plane arrived on the scene and forced her to dive.

On the afternoon of 25 January 1945, Blackfin made contact with the submarine USS Hardhead (SS-365). Since both Japanese convoys Blackfin had sighted were in shallow waters nearing Singapore, the commanding officers of the two submarines agreed to abandon the chase. Later that night, Blackfin came across a Japanese antisubmarine warfare group searching for American submarines. The Japanese ships began chasing Blackfin, but she escaped unharmed.

A few days later, Blackfin received orders to take station off Saigon in Japanese-occupied French Indochina for lifeguard duty in support of Allied airstrikes. No activity was seen in the area, so Blackfin moved to patrol the southern approaches to the Palawan Passage and Balabac Strait. She then moved farther west to join a submarine scouting line in an attempt to contact a large Japanese naval force heading north from Singapore to Japan. On the afternoon of 12 February 1945, she spotted a Japanese force consisting of two battleships, a heavy cruiser, and at least three destroyers. She headed north into heavy seas in order to get into position for an attack. As she closed the Japanese task force, one of the Japanese destroyers broke away from the formation and headed toward her, forcing her to open the range while trying to maintain contact. Faster than Blackfin, the Japanese ships gradually opened the range and disappeared.

Blackfin then received orders to proceed to Subic Bay on Luzon in the Philippine Islands, where she concluded her patrol on 15 February 1945. She was one of the first three American submarines to arrive at the newly established base, and U.S. Army forces were still fighting the Japanese for control of the town of Olongapo, the main seaport on Subic Bay, when she arrived. The base lacked its full complement of personnel, and the resulting manpower shortage meant that Blackfin′s crew carried out its own refit with some help from the crew of the submarine tender USS Griffin (AS-13).

==== Third war patrol ====
On 6 March 1945, Blackfin set out from Subic Bay on her third war patrol. She was assigned a patrol area in the South China Sea off the coast of French Indochina near Camranh Bay as part of a large coordinated attack group of U.S. submarines.

Late in March 1945, the coordinated attack group received a report of a heavily escorted Japanese convoy moving up the coast of French Indochina. On the morning of 28 March, Blackfin spotted the masts of several ships north of Camranh Bay. Since the convoy was hugging the coastline to make submarine attacks more difficult, she had to enter shallow water to press home her attack. Just as she closed to within torpedo range of the largest ship of the convoy, one of the escorts began dropping depth charges. The first depth-charge attack nearly sank Blackfin and put most of her equipment out of commission. She stayed on the bottom in 150 feet (46 m) of water for several hours in the hope of shaking the Japanese escorts. The Japanese ships finally gave up the hunt, and Blackfin cleared the area and headed for the open sea to begin repairing her damage.

After Blackfin′s crew had more fully surveyed her damage, orders arrived for her to proceed to Fremantle for repairs. On 9 April 1945, she arrived at Fremantle and began repairs and a refit, completing her patrol.

==== Fourth war patrol ====
On 7 May 1945, Blackfin departed Fremantle to begin her fourth war patrol, assigned a patrol area in the vicinity of Singapore. After only two days on station, engineering failures forced her to proceed to Subic Bay for repairs. She moored alongside the submarine tender USS Anthedon (AS-24) there, but Anthedon′s crew found the necessary repairs to be beyond their capacity. As a result, orders came sending Blackfin to Pearl Harbor. She made a fuel stop at Saipan on the way and reached Pearl Harbor in mid-June 1945.

==== June–August 1945 ====
After three weeks of repairs at Pearl Harbor, Blackfin got underway on 17 July 1945 for the western Pacific. She stopped at Midway Atoll in the Northwestern Hawaiian Islands from 21 to 29 July 1945 for further repairs and training. She then departed for Saipan, arriving there on 7 August 1945.

==== Fifth war patrol ====
On 11 August 1945, Blackfin got underway from Saipan to embark upon her fifth war patrol. She was in the eastern approaches to the Ryukyu Islands en route to her patrol area in the Yellow Sea when World War II ended with the cessation of hostiities with Japan on 15 August 1945. She nonetheless continued on to the Yellow Sea, where she began sinking floating naval mines. She sank 61 mines before receiving orders on 29 August 1945 set a course for Guam in the Mariana Islands. After weathering a typhoon, she concluded her patrol with her arrival at Guam on 5 September 1945.

=== 1945–1948 ===
After undergoing repairs and fueling at Guam, Blackfin proceeded to San Diego, California, where she joined Submarine Squadron 1 and began local operations off the coast of California. On 2 January 1946, she got underway for Guam with other units of the squadron. She remained at Guam until 20 February 1946, when she headed back to the United States West Coast.

After an overhaul at the Mare Island Naval Shipyard on Mare Island in Vallejo, California, Blackfin stood out of San Francisco Bay on 28 June 1946 to participate in Operation Iceberg. She paused at Pearl Harbor to top off fuel and supplies, and then left in company with the submarine USS Trumpetfish (SS-425) bound for the Arctic Ocean. At Dutch Harbor on Amaknak Island in the Aleutian Islands, the submarines USS Cusk (SS-348) and USS Diodon (SS-349) joined the mission, and the group proceeded north through the Bering Sea and the Bering Strait to the Arctic Ocean and the Arctic ice pack. Blackfin crossed the Arctic Circle before leaving the Arctic Ocean on 30 July 1946 and heading for Guam. She reached Apra Harbor on Guam on 12 August 1946.

Blackfin provided antisubmarine warfare training services at Guam and also made a brief trip to Truk in the Caroline Islands. She returned to Pearl Harbor on 26 December 1946 and carried out independent ship's exercises and multiship maneuvers in Hawaiian waters through 8 July 1947, when she shaped a course for San Diego. On 23 July 1947, she arrived at San Diego and reported to Submarine Squadron 3 for temporary duty. She provided antisubmarine warfare training services in the San Diego operating area until 6 September 1947, when she got underway to return to duty with Submarine Squadron 1 at Pearl Harbor. In October 1947, soon after her return to Pearl Harbor, she entered the Pearl Harbor Naval Shipyard for an overhaul.

After the completion of her overhaul, Blackfin resumed local operations in Hawaiian waters in February 1948. On 21 May 1948, she left Parl Harbor on a simulated war patrol and stopped at Adak in the Aleutian Islands and at Kodiak on Kodiak Island before completing the patrol on 1 July 1948 at Mare Island Naval Shipyard, where she was scheduled for inactivation. She was decommissioned there on 19 November 1948.

=== 1950–1955 ===
Reactivation preparations for Blackfin began at Mare Island Naval Shipyard on 1 November 1950. Under the Greater Underwater Propulsion Power (GUPPY) Program, she underwent a conversion to a "GUPPY 1A" submarine. When her conversion was completed, Blackfin was recommissioned on 15 May 1951. After four weeks of sea trials, she proceeded to San Diego to rejoin Submarine Squadron 3 and operated from San Diego until December 1951.

On 14 December 1951, Blackfin departed San Diego for the Far East. Following a stop at Pearl Harbor, she reached United States Fleet Activities Yokosuka at Yokosuka, Japan, on 4 January 1952 and subsequently provided services to surface and aviation units, as well as carrying out training exercises. On 8 February 1952, she got underway for Okinawa and held "hunter-killer" antisubmarine warfare exercises en route. She departed Okinawa on 24 February 1952 and returned to Yokosuka on 1 March. She commenced a patrol from Yokosuka on 18 March 1953. After a 50-day stint underway, she returned to Yokosuka on 15 May 1952. She got underway on 24 May 1952 to return to her home port of San Diego. She paused briefly at Pearl Harbor before reaching San Diego on 14 June 1952 and resuming her duties with Submarine Squadron 3.

After extended local operations in the San Diego area, Blackfin departed for the Hunters Point Naval Shipyard at San Francisco, California, in late February 1953 for overhaul. She conducted post-overhaul sea trials in June 1953 and departed the U.S. West Coast on 2 July 1953 en route Pearl Harbor. After a period of replenishment, she departed Pearl Harbor on 16 July 1953 on a special patrol. She completed that cruise with her return to Pearl Harbor on 11 September 1953. On 13 September she got underway for San Diego. She reached San Diego on the 21 September 1953 and resumed local operations.

On 8 March 1954, Blackfin′s home port became Pearl Harbor. She arrived there on 23 March 1954 and began local operations and training exercises in Hawaiian waters. She entered the Pearl Harbor Naval Shipyard on 1 June 1954 for an overhaul. It was completed on 5 October 1954, and she resumed local operations.

Blackfin left Pearl Harbor on 4 January 1955 to begin another tour in Far Eastern waters. On 18 January she arrived at Yokosuka and was assigned to the United States Seventh Fleet. She provided services to antisubmarine warfare forces, visited Okinawa twice, took part in exercises with Republic of China Navy forces, and spent four days at Hong Kong. She returned to Pearl Harbor on 28 June 1955 and took up a routine of local operations and upkeep.

=== 1956–1960 ===
From January to October 1956, Blackfin participated in submarine crew training exercises and provided services to surface and air antisubmarine forces operating in the Hawaiian Islands. On 12 October 1956, she entered the Pearl Harbor Naval Shipyard for an overhaul which was completed on 1 March 1957. She then conducted refresher training.

Blackfin departed Pearl Harbor on 6 May 1957 for a six-month western Pacific cruise. During the cruise, she took part in exercises with other U.S. Navy and Republic of China Navy units, carried out submarine crew training, and conducted two patrols. She made port calls at Yokosuka, Japan; Kaohsiung, Taiwan; and Hong Kong. On 1 July 1957, she was assigned to Submarine Division 72, a subordinate part of Submarine Squadron 7. She returned to Pearl Harbor on 1 November 1957 and conducted local operations and upkeep until the autumn of 1958.

On 31 October 1958, Blackfin left Pearl Harbor and proceeded to the western Pacific. She took part in exercises with the Philippine Navy, the Republic of China Navy, and the Republic of Korea Navy. Among the ports she visited were Yokosuka, Kobe, Sasebo, Iwakuni, and Beppu, Japan; Subic Bay in the Philippines; Chinhae, South Korea; Kaohsiung, Taiwan; and Guam in the Mariana Islands. She departed Guam in April 1959 and set a course for Australia to join in ceremonies commemorating the May 1942 Battle of the Coral Sea during World War II. She visited Brisbane and Newcastle, Australia. She left Newcastle on 4 May 1959 and arrived at Pearl Harbor on 15 May 1959.

From June through October 1959, Blackfin participated in local operations in Hawaiian waters and made recreation trips to Kailua-Kona on the island of Hawaii and Wailuku on Maui. On 9 November 1959, she commenced an overhaul at the Pearl Harbor Naval Shipyard.

=== 1960–1965 ===
With her overhaul complete, Blackfin was ready to resume operations on 16 May 1960, and she began refresher training and preparations for deployment. On 19 August 1960, she embarked upon her fifth western Pacific tour of duty. During the cruise, she participated in training with the U.S. Seventh Fleet as well as ships from the Japan Maritime Self-Defense Force and the Republic of Korea Navy. She visited ports in Japan, South Korea, Taiwan, Okinawa, and the Philippines. After a liberty call at Hong Kong, Blackfin returned to Pearl Harbor in February 1961.

Following a short leave and upkeep period, Blackfin resumed local operations in Hawaiian waters. In September 1961, she left Hawaii for a cold-weather training cruise to Alaska. While in Alaskan waters, she visited Adak in the Aleutian Islands and Kodiak in the Kodiak Islands before returning to Pearl Harbor late in October 1961. She spent the next six months operating locally out of Pearl Harbor.

In early April 1962, Blackfin left Pearl Harbor bound for the Pacific Northwest. During her deployment, she provided services to various aviation squadrons and United States Naval Reserve submarine divisions and conducted guest cruises. She visited Portland, Oregon; Victoria and Vancouver, British Columbia, Canada; and Port Angeles and Seattle, Washington. At Seattle, she was present at the opening of the Century 21 Exposition, also known as the Seattle World's Fair, on 21 April 1962. She returned to Pearl Harbor late in June 1962 and resumed local operations in Hawaii until early November 1962, when she began an overhaul at the Pearl Harbor Naval Shipyard.

On 15 March 1963, Blackfin began refresher training in Hawaiian waters. She left Pearl Harbor on 17 April 1963 and shaped a course for the U.S. West Coast. She stopped first at Newport, Oregon, on 27 April. On 30 April, she got underway for Dabob Bay, Washington, to undergo a fire control alignment inspection. Upon completing the tests, she made calls at Seattle, Vancouver, San Francisco, and San Diego. She also stopped at Long Beach Naval Shipyard in Long Beach, California, where scenes for the 1963 movie Move Over, Darling with Doris Day, James Garner, and Polly Bergen, which began filming in May 1963, were shot aboard her. She headed back to Pearl Harbor in mid-June 1963 and provided services to air and surface units at Pearl Harbor until November 1963.

On 27 November 1963, Blackfin began a transit to Yokosuka. After her arrival in early December 1963, she operated with other U.S. Seventh Fleet units, then spent the Christmas holidays in late December 1963 in port at Sasebo. She remained in Japanese waters through March 1964, providing services to U.S. Navy forces and the Japan Maritime Self-Defense Force and participating in fleet and special operations. She then proceeded to Naha, Okinawa, and Subic Bay. In late April 1964 she proceeded to Brisbane and Mackay, Australia, for the annual celebration of the Battle of the Coral Sea. She returned to Pearl Harbor in mid-May 1964 and soon resumed local operations. She remained in the Pearl Harbor area through the end of 1964.

Blackfin spent most of the time between January and March 1965 in port at Pearl Harbor, only putting to sea very occasionally for a brief local mission. In March 1965, she again deployed to the western Pacific. Among her ports of call were Yokosuka and Sasebo, Japan; Subic Bay in the Philippines; Hong Kong; and Bangkok, Thailand. After five months with the U.S. Seventh Fleet, she returned to Pearl Harbor early in September 1965 and spent the next few weeks in a leave-and-upkeep status. From mid-October through early December 1965, she provided local services in Hawaiian waters and participated in the antisubmarine warfare exercise SUBASWEX 4-65.

=== 1966–1972 ===
In early 1966, Blackfin entered the Pearl Harbor Naval Shipyard for an overhaul, during which a new fiberglass conning tower fairwater was added along with a new forward superstructure. She left the shipyard in August 1966 and began a series of exercises, torpedo firings, and refresher training.

On 16 November 1966, Blackfin departed Pearl Harbor bound for Yokosuka. Arriving there on 30 November 1966, Blackfin underwent repairs before resuming operations with the U.S. Seventh Fleet. She spent the Christmas holidays in late December 1966 in port at Okinawa and the end of 1966 found her in the South China Sea heading for Subic Bay. From January to March 1967, Blackfin shuttled between Subic Bay and the Gulf of Tonkin, operated off the coast of North Vietnam with U.S. Seventh Fleet forces in support of U.S. operations in the Vietnam War. She headed south from Subic Bay on 15 April 1967 and paused at Mindanao′s Zamboanga Peninsula in the Philippines for a two-day goodwill visit before pushing on to Fremantle, Australia, where she stopped from 30 April to 5 May 1967 and took part in the celebration of the 25th anniversary of the Battle of the Coral Sea. Shen then visited Hobart, Tasmania, from 11 to 15 May 1967 and made a stop at Pago Pago on Tutuila in American Samoa before returning to Pearl Harbor on 6 June 1967. After a four-week leave and upkeep period, she resumed local operations for the remainder of 1967. During filming of the 1968 movie Ice Station Zebra with Rock Hudson, Ernest Borgnine, and Patrick McGoohan, which took place between June and October 1967, scenes depicting the movie's fictional submarine USS Tigerfish submerging and surfacing were shot off Hawaii aboard Blackfin.

Blackfin entered drydock briefly in January 1968 and then took up local operations once again until late March 1968. On 28 March 1968, she left Pearl Harbor to return to the western Pacific. She reached Yokosuka on 11 April 1968 but departed for special operations on 20 April. On 12 June 1968, she returned to Yokosuka and entered drydock for repairs. On 26 June 1968, she got underway for visits to Buckner Bay on Okinawa and Hong Kong. She returned to Yokosuka on 20 July 1968 but left again on 26 July for another series of special operations. These ended at Yokosuka on 19 September 1968 with a two-week leave and upkeep period. Early in October 1968, she got underway for Pearl Harbor, which she reached on 16 October 1968. During November and December 1968, she carried out local operations and training exercises in Hawaiian waters.

On 23 January 1969, Blackfin departed Pearl Harbor. She arrived at the Mare Island Naval Shipyard on 5 February 1969 to begin an overhaul. She completed the overhaul and her ensuing sea trials on 10 July 1969 and left the San Francisco Bay bound for her new home port, San Diego. She again put to sea on 21 July 1969 to visit Mazatlan, Mexico. Upon her return to San Diego, she conducted refresher training. Weapons systems accuracy trials in Dabob Bay, Washington, followed between 14 and 24 August 1969 and brought shore leave for her crew at Seattle and Vancouver. She departed Vancouver on 31 August 1969 to return to San Diego, where she spent September 1969 in upkeep and in-port training. On 6 October 1969, she moved to the San Francisco Bay area to provide training to U.S. Naval Reserve submarine units. She returned to San Diego on 12 October 1969 and devoted the next four-and-a-half months to an extensive diesel engine overhaul.

=== 1970–1972 ===
In mid-March 1970, after the completion of her engine overhaul, Blackfin held two weeks of submarine crew training. She then provided services to aviation units at San Diego.

Blackfin departed San Diego on 6 August 1970 to begin a western Pacific deployment. She stopped at Pearl Harbor for a week of training and briefings before resuming her westward voyage. She reached Yokosuka on 4 September 1970, underwent repairs, and then proceeded to Kobe, Japan, to visit Expo '70, a world's fair at Osaka, Japan. She returned to Yokosuka on 19 September, but resumed operations on 22 October 1970 to provide services at sea to ships of the Japan Maritime Self- Defense Force and destroyers of the U.S. Seventh Fleet. She stopped at Subic Bay on 16 November 1970 for repairs, then returned to sea. From 26 November through 3 December 1970, she provided services to ships of the Republic of China Navy. On 5 December, she returned to Subic Bay for five days of upkeep. She got back underway on 10 December for a major fleet antisubmarine warfare exercise. Upon its completion, she visited Hong Kong for a shore leave period over the Christmas holidays in late December 1970. The end of 1970 found her providing services to antisubmarine warfare units of the U.S. Seventh Fleet off Vietnam. After pausing briefly at Subic Bay, she got underway on 23 January 1971 to head for Australia. She moored at Brisbane on 6 February and began a six-day shore leave period. She then commenced the voyage back to San Diego, with stops en route at Suva in the Fiji Islands, and Pago Pago, American Samoa. She reached San Diego on 10 March 1971 after an absence of over seven months.

In April 1971, Blackfin resumed training duties with aviation and surface antisubmarine warfare units of the U.S. Pacific Fleet. She entered drydock at San Diego on 23 August 1971 for repairs, then returned to duty on 15 September 1971 and began a final upkeep and loading period in preparation for a goodwill visit to several countries in Central America and South America. On 26 October 1971, she departed San Diego bound for Corinto, Nicaragua, which she visited from 4 to 9 November 1971. She then continued southward and made port calls at Buenaventura, Colombia; Guayaquil, Ecuador; Salaverry and Callao, Peru; and Acapulco, Mexico, before returning to San Diego on 20 December 1971.

From January to June 1972, Blackfin operated along the U.S. West Coast, visiting San Francisco, Avalon, and Monterey, California; Seattle and Port Angeles, Washington; and Vancouver, British Columbia. She then began preparations for deactivation and was decommissioned on 15 September 1972. She simultaneously was struck from the Naval Vessel Register.

== Disposal ==
Blackfin was sunk as a torpedo target in the "SubSinkEx Project Thurber" project off San Diego on 13 May 1973. Some sources indicate that the sinking was by deliberate partial flooding to acquire acoustic data on submarine implosions and that no torpedoes were used.

== Honors and awards ==
- Asiatic-Pacific Campaign Medal with three battle stars for World War II service
- World War II Victory Medal
- Navy Occupation Service Medal with "ASIA" clasp
- National Defense Service Medal
- Armed Forces Expeditionary Medal
- Vietnam Service Medal with four battle stars for Vietnam War service
