= USS Greenfish =

Submarine of the United States

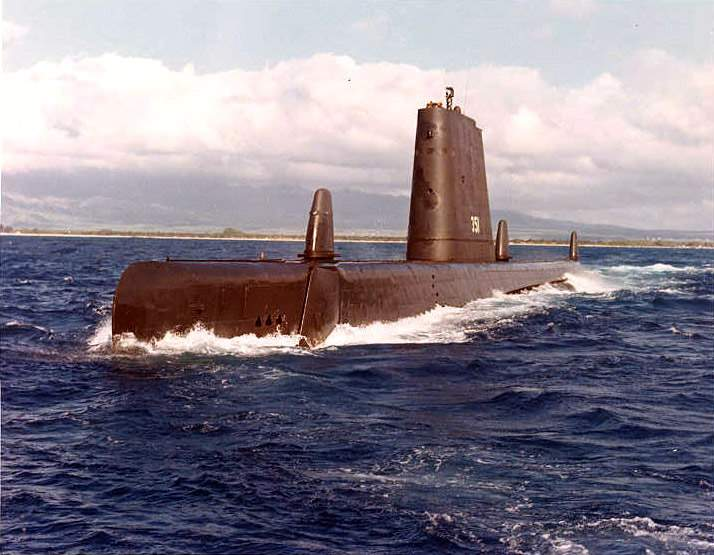
- Greenfish (SS-351) c. 1960s with the three distinctive shark-fin domes of the PUFFS sonar.

History

United States
- Name: USS Greenfish
- Builder: Electric Boat Company, Groton, Connecticut
- Laid down: 29 June 1944
- Launched: 21 December 1945
- Commissioned: 7 June 1946
- Decommissioned: 29 October 1973
- Stricken: 29 October 1973
- Fate: Transferred to Brazil, 19 December 1973

Brazil
- Name: Amazonas
- Acquired: 19 December 1973
- Stricken: 15 October 1992
- Identification: S-16
- Fate: Scrapped in 2001

General characteristics
- Class & type: Balao-class diesel-electric submarine
- Displacement: 1,526 long tons (1,550 t) surfaced; 2,424 tons (2,463 t) submerged
- Length: 311 ft 9 in (95.02 m)
- Beam: 27 ft 3 in (8.31 m)
- Draft: 16 ft 10 in (5.13 m) maximum
- Propulsion: 4 × General Motors Model 16-278A V16 diesel engines driving electrical generators; 2 × 126-cell Sargo batteries; 4 × high-speed General Electric electric motors with reduction gears; 2 × propellers; 5,400 shp (4.0 MW) surfaced; 2,740 shp (2.0 MW) submerged
- Speed: 20.25 knots (38 km/h) surfaced; 8.75 knots (16 km/h) submerged
- Range: 11,000 nautical miles (20,000 km) surfaced at 10 knots (19 km/h)
- Endurance: 48 hours at 2 knots (3.7 km/h) submerged; 75 days on patrol
- Test depth: 400 ft (120 m)
- Complement: 10 officers, 70–71 enlisted
- Armament: 10 × 21-inch (533 mm) torpedo tubes; 6 forward, 4 aft; 24 torpedoes; 1 × 5-inch (127 mm) / 25 caliber deck gun; Bofors 40 mm and Oerlikon 20 mm cannon

General characteristics (Guppy II)
- Class & type: none
- Displacement: 1,870 tons (1,900 t) surfaced; 2,440 tons (2,480 t) submerged
- Length: 307 ft (94 m)
- Beam: 27 ft 4 in (8.33 m)
- Draft: 17 ft (5.2 m)
- Propulsion: Snorkel added; Batteries upgraded to GUPPY type, capacity expanded to 504 cells (1 × 184 cell, 1 × 68 cell, and 2 × 126 cell batteries); 4 × high-speed electric motors replaced with 2 × low-speed direct drive electric motors
- Speed: Surfaced: 18.0 knots (20.7 mph; 33.3 km/h) maximum; 13.5 knots (15.5 mph; 25.0 km/h) cruising; Submerged: 16.0 knots (18.4 mph; 29.6 km/h) for ½ hour; 9.0 knots (10.4 mph; 16.7 km/h) snorkeling; 3.5 knots (4.0 mph; 6.5 km/h) cruising
- Range: 15,000 nmi (28,000 km) surfaced at 11 knots (13 mph; 20 km/h)
- Endurance: 48 hours at 4 knots (5 mph; 7 km/h) submerged
- Complement: 9–10 officers; 5 petty officers; 70 enlisted men
- Sensors & processing systems: WFA active sonar; JT passive sonar; Mk 106 torpedo fire control system
- Armament: 10 × 21 inch (533 mm) torpedo tubes; (six forward, four aft); all guns removed

General characteristics (Guppy III)
- Class & type: none
- Displacement: 1,975 tons (2,007 t) surfaced; 2,450 tons (2,489 t) submerged
- Length: 321 ft (98 m)
- Beam: 27 ft 4 in (8.33 m)
- Draft: 17 ft (5.2 m)
- Speed: Surfaced: 17.2 knots (19.8 mph; 31.9 km/h) maximum; 12.2 knots (14.0 mph; 22.6 km/h) cruising; Submerged: 14.5 knots (16.7 mph; 26.9 km/h) for ½ hour; 6.2 knots (7.1 mph; 11.5 km/h) snorkeling; 3.7 knots (4.3 mph; 6.9 km/h) cruising
- Range: 15,900 nmi (29,400 km) surfaced at 8.5 knots (10 mph; 16 km/h)
- Endurance: 36 hours at 3 knots (3 mph; 6 km/h) submerged
- Complement: 8–10 officers; 5 petty officers; 70-80 enlisted men
- Sensors & processing systems: BQS-4 active search sonar; BQR-2B passive search sonar; BQG-4 passive attack sonar

USS Greenfish (SS-351) was a Balao-class submarine of the United States Navy. It was named for the greenfish.

Greenfish (SS-351) was launched by the Electric Boat Co., Groton, Connecticut, 21 December 1945; sponsored by Mrs. Thomas J. Doyle; and commissioned 7 June 1946.

Greenfish's shakedown cruise 22 July to 13 September 1946, took her to Barranquilla, Colombia; the Canal Zone; Callao, Peru; and St. Thomas, Virgin Islands. Exercises out of New London and in Chesapeake Bay carried her through the year, and the early months of 1947 found Greenfish back in the Caribbean for fleet exercises. On 11 February 1947 she effected one of the first transfers of personnel from an aircraft carrier, Franklin D. Roosevelt, to a submarine by helicopter.

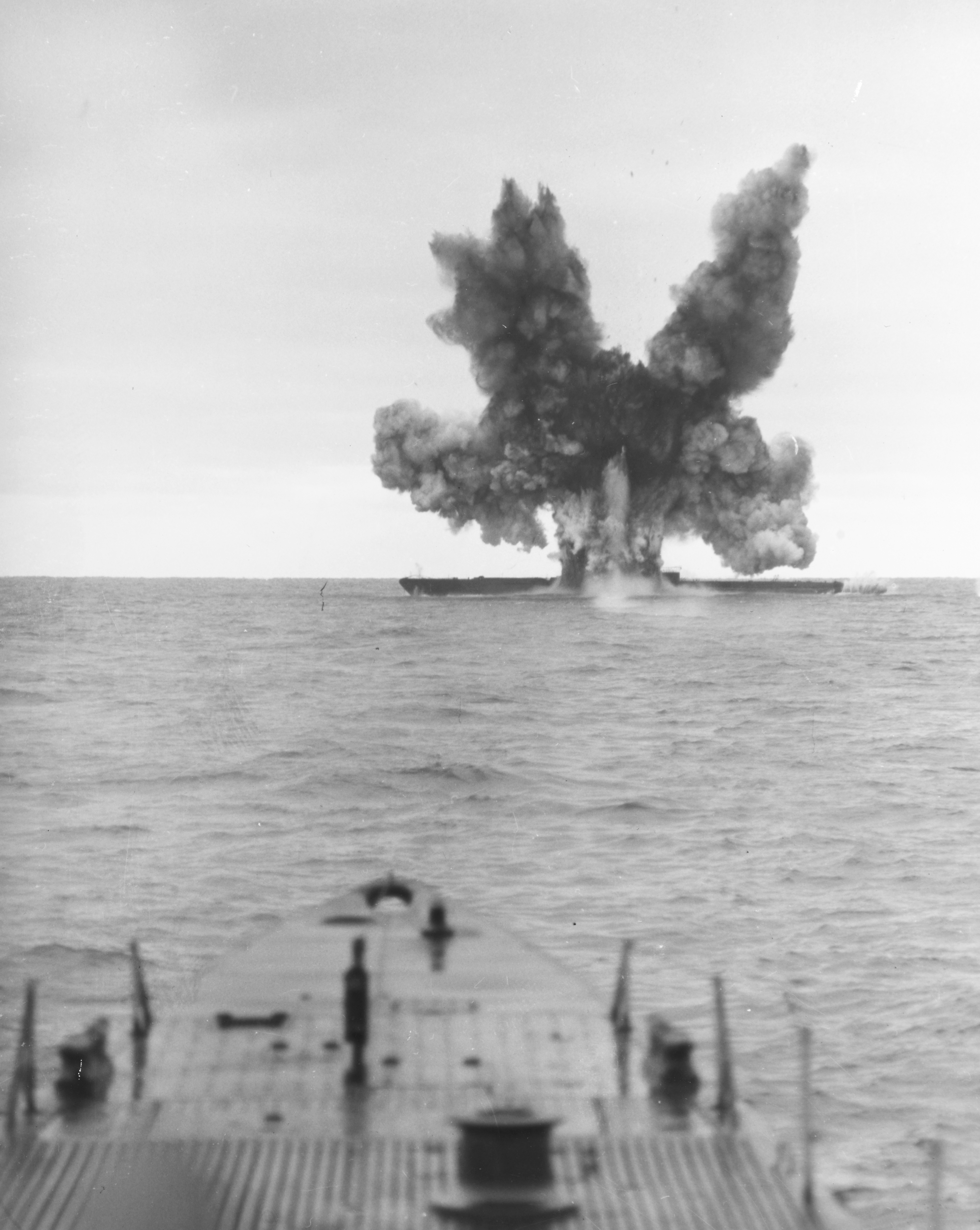
USS Greenfish torpedo sinks U-234 off Cape Cod, Mass 20 November 1947.

Various exercises along the American coast and in the Caribbean occupied Greenfish until 8 January 1948, when she entered the Electric Boat Co. yards for a GUPPY II conversion. This included the installation of snorkeling equipment on Greenfish, enabling her to run her diesel engines while submerged, which required the enlargement of her "sail". In addition, more batteries were installed to increase her submerged speed and permit the ship to remain completely submerged for longer periods.

Returning to New London 21 August 1948, Greenfish sailed on her "second" shakedown cruise 1 September, with Rear Admiral James J. Fife, Commander, Submarine Force, Atlantic Fleet, aboard. She transited the Panama Canal 9 September and engaged in exercises at Balboa before returning to New London 24 September.

The new GUPPY submarine was attached to the Pacific Fleet, and sailed for Pearl Harbor 23 October. She reached her new home 25 November 1948. With the exception of ASW and harbor defense exercises in Puget Sound in 1950 and a subsequent Mare Island overhaul, Greenfish operated out of Pearl Harbor on local exercises through 1951.

Departing Pearl Harbor 15 November 1951, Greenfish sailed to Yokosuka, Japan, for Korean War duty. After a patrol 31 January to 1 March 1952, She participated in exercises at Okinawa and then returned to Hawaii 2 June. Local and special operations filled her time until 5 November 1954, when she entered the Pearl Harbor Shipyard for another modernization overhaul.

Greenfish, overhaul completed 6 July 1955, sailed for deployment with the 7th Fleet 15 September and reached Yokosuka 29 September. From 19 October to 15 November she engaged in special operations, and then embarked on a tour of Southeast Asia. Ports visited by Greenfish during her 2-month cruise included Manila, Singapore, Rangoon, where she was the first submarine ever to visit and was inspected by Burmese Prime Minister U Nu, and Hong Kong. After further exercises off Okinawa and Yokosuka, Greenfish returned to Pearl Harbor 13 March 1956.

The following 5 years fell into a pattern for Greenfish—local operations out of Pearl Harbor, special operations, exercises along the American coast, and periodic overhauls. Greenfish entered Pearl Harbor Shipyard 15 December 1960 for a FRAM (Fleet Rehabilitation and Modernization) overhaul and extensive conversion to a GUPPY III class ship. This included cutting Greenfish in half and adding a 15-foot (5 m) section of hull to permit more batteries and other equipment.

Conversion completed, Greenfish departed 28 July 1961 for shakedown, operations at Pearl Harbor, and in December sailed to serve with the 7th Fleet. In addition to special operations, the submarine participated in various fleet and ASW exercises and visited several ports, including Hong Kong, Manila, and Okinawa. Returning to Pearl Harbor June 1962, Greenfish engaged in local operations until October, when the Cuban Missile Crisis sent her to Japan to strengthen the 7th Fleet. Upon return to Hawaii December 1962, she underwent a brief overhaul and then resumed her peace time schedule of local and special operations interspersed with training exercises.

Based at Pearl Harbor, she participated in various ASW exercises while maintaining the high tempo of training and readiness for her crew. From 30 March 1964 to 4 September she underwent overhaul; and, after a cruise to the Pacific Coast and back, Greenfish departed for the Far East 27 January 1965. She arrived Japan early in February and during the next 4 months operated with the 7th Fleet in waters from Japan to the Philippines. She returned to Pearl Harbor 1 August, continued type training into 1966, and deployed once again to the Western Pacific 1 February 1966. She completed her duty with the 7th Fleet 1 July and returned to Hawaii later that month to resume readiness exercises out of Pearl Harbor. Into 1967 she continued to serve in the Pacific Fleet's submarine force. In 1970 she underwent a yard overhaul at Hunters Point Naval Shipyard, San Francisco, CA. She then underwent weapons alignment in Bangor, WA. Greenfish Transited the Panama Canal and proceeded to Sub base New London. She made a Med cruise and North Atlantic cruise in 1971 and a springboard exercise in 1972.

== Brazilian submarine Amazonas (S-16) ==
Greenfish was decommissioned, struck from the US Naval Register 29 October 1973, and transferred (sold) under terms of the Security Assistance Program to Brazil, 19 December 1973, where she was renamed Amazonas (S-16), the eighth Brazilian Navy ship to be named for the Amazon River. She was struck 15 October 1992, originally to be transformed into a museum ship at the centro Histórico da Marinha in Rio de Janeiro. However, she was ultimately judged to be in too bad condition, and was scrapped in 2001.
