= USS Cubera =

Submarine of the United States

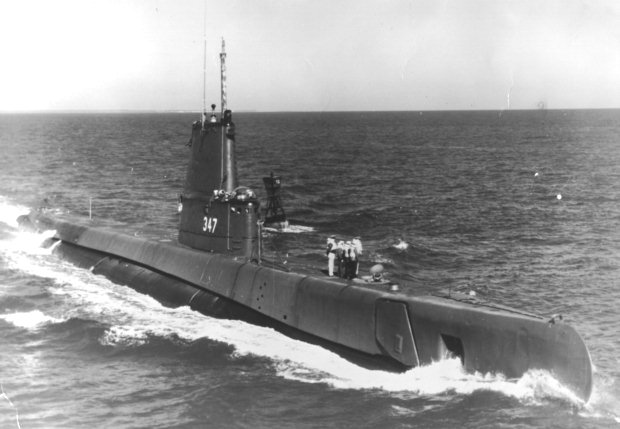
- Cubera (SS-347), after GUPPY modernization.

History

United States
- Name: USS Cubera
- Builder: Electric Boat Company, Groton, Connecticut
- Laid down: 11 May 1944
- Launched: 17 June 1945
- Commissioned: 19 December 1945
- Decommissioned: 5 January 1972
- Stricken: 5 January 1972
- Identification: SS-347
- Fate: Transferred to Venezuela, 5 January 1972

Venezuela
- Name: ARV Tiburon
- Acquired: 1972
- Identification: S-12
- Fate: Scrapped, 1989

General characteristics
- Class & type: Balao-class diesel-electric submarine
- Displacement: 1,526 long tons (1,550 t) surfaced; 2,424 tons (2,463 t) submerged
- Length: 311 ft 9 in (95.02 m)
- Beam: 27 ft 3 in (8.31 m)
- Draft: 16 ft 10 in (5.13 m) maximum
- Propulsion: 4 × General Motors Model 16-278A V16 diesel engines driving electrical generators; 2 × 126-cell Sargo batteries; 4 × high-speed General Electric electric motors with reduction gears; 2 × propellers; 5,400 shp (4.0 MW) surfaced; 2,740 shp (2.0 MW) submerged
- Speed: 20.25 knots (38 km/h) surfaced; 8.75 knots (16 km/h) submerged
- Range: 11,000 nautical miles (20,000 km) surfaced at 10 knots (19 km/h)
- Endurance: 48 hours at 2 knots (3.7 km/h) submerged; 75 days on patrol
- Test depth: 400 ft (120 m)
- Complement: 10 officers, 70–71 enlisted
- Armament: 10 × 21-inch (533 mm) torpedo tubes; 6 forward, 4 aft; 24 torpedoes; 1 × 5-inch (127 mm) / 25 caliber deck gun; Bofors 40 mm and Oerlikon 20 mm cannon

General characteristics (Guppy II)
- Class & type: none
- Displacement: 1,870 tons (1,900 t) surfaced; 2,440 tons (2,480 t) submerged
- Length: 307 ft (94 m)
- Beam: 27 ft 4 in (8.33 m)
- Draft: 17 ft (5.2 m)
- Propulsion: Snorkel added; Batteries upgraded to GUPPY type, capacity expanded to 504 cells (1 × 184 cell, 1 × 68 cell, and 2 × 126 cell batteries); 4 × high-speed electric motors replaced with 2 × low-speed direct drive electric motors
- Speed: Surfaced: 18.0 knots (20.7 mph; 33.3 km/h) maximum; 13.5 knots (15.5 mph; 25.0 km/h) cruising; Submerged: 16.0 knots (18.4 mph; 29.6 km/h) for ½ hour; 9.0 knots (10.4 mph; 16.7 km/h) snorkeling; 3.5 knots (4.0 mph; 6.5 km/h) cruising
- Range: 15,000 nmi (28,000 km) surfaced at 11 knots (13 mph; 20 km/h)
- Endurance: 48 hours at 4 knots (5 mph; 7 km/h) submerged
- Complement: 9–10 officers; 5 petty officers; 70 enlisted men
- Sensors & processing systems: WFA active sonar; JT passive sonar; Mk 106 torpedo fire control system
- Armament: 10 × 21-inch (533 mm) torpedo tubes; (six forward, four aft); all guns removed

USS Cubera (SS-347), a Balao-class submarine, was a ship of the United States Navy named for the cubera, a large fish of the snapper family found in the West Indies.

Cubera (SS-347) was launched 17 June 1945 by Electric Boat Co., Groton, Conn.; sponsored by Mrs. J. Taber; commissioned 19 December 1945 and reported to the Atlantic Fleet.

After shakedown training off New London, Cubera arrived at Key West, Fla., 19 March 1946. She tested sonar equipment, provided services to experimental antisubmarine warfare development projects in the Florida Straits, and joined in fleet exercises until 4 July 1947 when she sailed to Philadelphia Naval Shipyard for an extensive GUPPY II modernization.

Returning to Key West 9 March 1948 Cubera continued to operate locally out of this port, as well as taking part in fleet exercises in the Caribbean and Atlantic until 3 July 1952 when she arrived at Norfolk, her new home port.

Cubera appeared in Ray Harryhausen's It Came from Beneath the Sea (1955), playing an "atomic sub" used to dispatch the film's giant octopus.

Through 1957 Cubera conducted local operations, and participated in fleet exercises in the Caribbean, as well as cruising to Sydney, Nova Scotia, in June 1955. During 1959 and 1960, she was assigned to Task Force Alfa, a force conducting constant experiments to improve antisubmarine warfare techniques. With this group she cruised the western Atlantic from Nova Scotia to Bermuda.

== ARV Tiburon (S-12) ==
Cubera was decommissioned and sold under the Security Assistance Program to Venezuela 5 January 1972. The Venezuelan Navy renamed her ARV Tiburon (S-12) ("Tiburon" means shark in Spanish). She was subsequently scrapped by Venezuela in 1989.
