= USS Halfbeak =

US Navy submarine

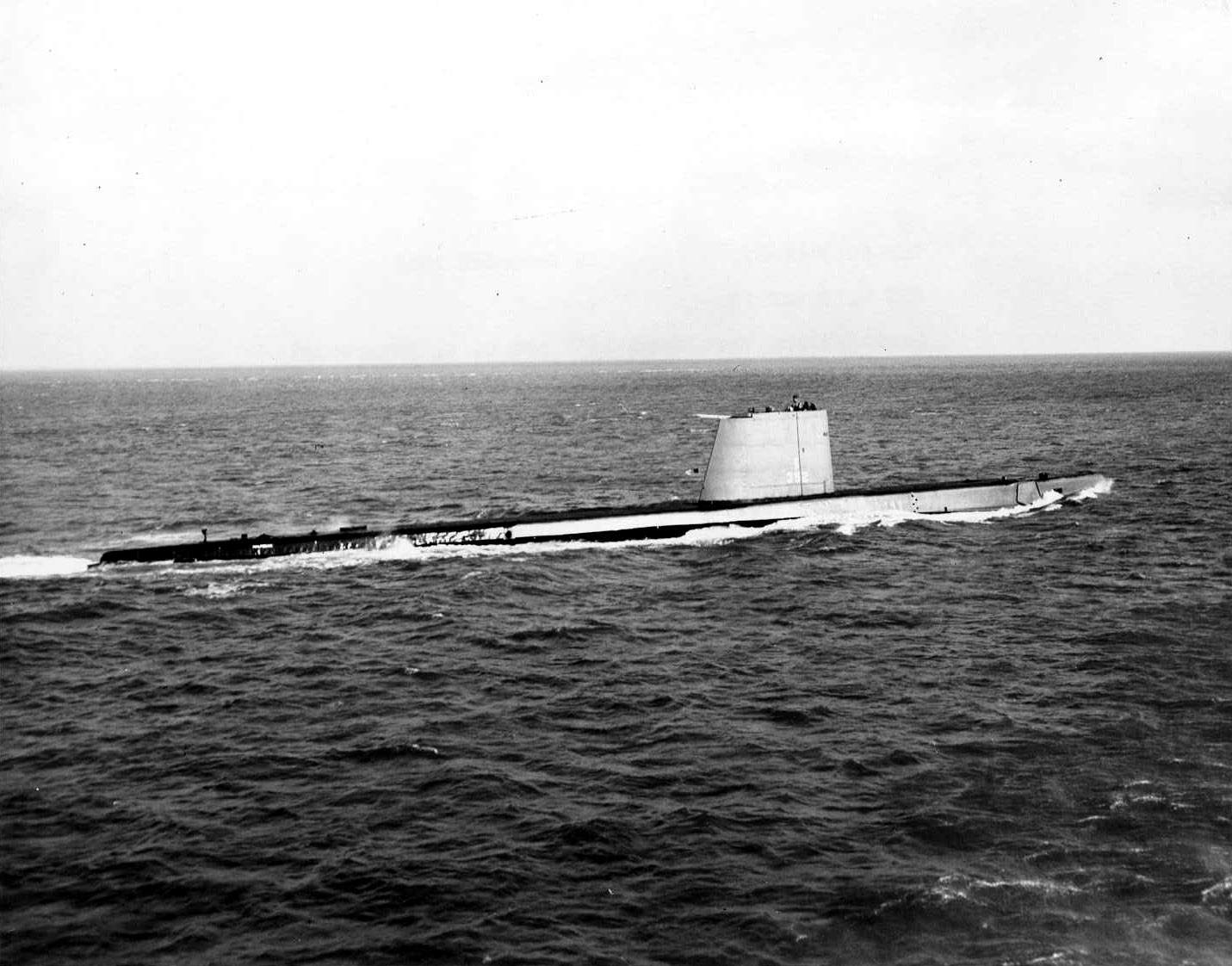
- Halfbeak (SS-352), underway, 1967.

History

United States
- Name: USS Halfbeak
- Builder: Electric Boat Company, Groton, Connecticut
- Laid down: 6 July 1944
- Launched: 19 February 1946
- Commissioned: 22 July 1946
- Decommissioned: 1 July 1971
- Stricken: 1 July 1971
- Fate: Sold for scrap, 13 June 1972

General characteristics
- Class & type: Balao-class diesel-electric submarine
- Displacement: 1,526 tons (1,550 t) surfaced; 2,424 tons (2,463 t) submerged
- Length: 311 ft 9 in (95.02 m)
- Beam: 27 ft 3 in (8.31 m)
- Draft: 16 ft 10 in (5.13 m) maximum
- Propulsion: 4 × Fairbanks-Morse Model 38D8-⅛ 10-cylinder opposed piston diesel engines driving electrical generators; 2 × 126-cell Sargo batteries; 4 × high-speed Elliott electric motors with reduction gears; two propellers; 5,400 shp (4.0 MW) surfaced; 2,740 shp (2.0 MW) submerged
- Speed: 20.25 knots (38 km/h) surfaced; 8.75 knots (16 km/h) submerged
- Range: 11,000 nautical miles (20,000 km) surfaced at 10 knots (19 km/h)
- Endurance: 48 hours at 2 knots (3.7 km/h) submerged; 75 days on patrol
- Test depth: 400 ft (120 m)
- Complement: 10 officers, 70–71 enlisted
- Armament: 10 × 21-inch (533 mm) torpedo tubes; 6 forward, 4 aft; 24 torpedoes; 1 × 5-inch (127 mm) / 25 caliber deck gun; Bofors 40 mm and Oerlikon 20 mm cannon

General characteristics (Guppy II)
- Class & type: none
- Displacement: 1,870 tons (1,900 t) surfaced; 2,440 tons (2,480 t) submerged
- Length: 307 ft (93.6 m)
- Beam: 27 ft 4 in (7.4 m)
- Draft: 17 ft (5.2 m)
- Propulsion: Snorkel added; Batteries upgraded to GUPPY type, capacity expanded to 504 cells (1 × 184 cell, 1 × 68 cell, and 2 × 126 cell batteries); 4 × high-speed electric motors replaced with 2 × low-speed direct drive electric motors
- Speed: Surfaced: 18.0 knots (20.7 mph; 33.3 km/h) maximum; 13.5 knots (15.5 mph; 25.0 km/h) cruising; Submerged: 16.0 knots (18.4 mph; 29.6 km/h) for ½ hour; 9.0 knots (10.4 mph; 16.7 km/h) snorkeling; 3.5 knots (4.0 mph; 6.5 km/h) cruising
- Range: 15,000 nm (28,000 km) surfaced at 11 knots (13 mph; 20 km/h)
- Endurance: 48 hours at 4 knots (5 mph; 7 km/h) submerged
- Complement: 9–10 officers; 5 petty officers; 70 enlisted men
- Sensors & processing systems: WFA active sonar; JT passive sonar; Mk 106 torpedo fire control system
- Armament: 10 × 21 inch (533 mm) torpedo tubes; (six forward, four aft); all guns removed

USS Halfbeak (SS-352), a Balao-class submarine, was a ship of the United States Navy named for the halfbeak.

== Construction and commissioning ==
Halfbeak was launched 19 February 1946 by the Electric Boat Company at Groton, Connecticut, sponsored by Mrs. William Craig, and commissioned on 22 July 1946.

== Service history ==
After shakedown in the Caribbean and along the Latin American coast to the Canal Zone, Ecuador, and Colombia, Halfbeak spent the next 3 years in training operations and fleet exercises out of New London, Conn., where she was part of SubRon 8. Entering the Portsmouth Naval Shipyard 12 September 1949, Halfbeak was converted to a GUPPY II type submarine. Fitted with a snorkel to enable her to stay submerged for long periods of time and distinguished by a greatly streamlined superstructure, Halfbeak left Portsmouth 13 January 1950 to work with the Research and Development Group at New London. While conducting tests on special underwater sound equipment, she made a cruise to English waters, operating off Jan Mayen Island, in the winter of 1951.

Halfbeak was engaged in further Caribbean exercises until 10 November 1954, when she sailed for her first Mediterranean cruise. Having visited Gibraltar, Naples, Marseilles, Lisbon, and Valencia, Spain, the submarine returned to New London 2 February 1955. A similar cruise in 1956 was punctuated by the Suez Crisis, and Halfbeak remained in the eastern Med operating with the 6th Fleet until January 1957 helping to maintain the peace in that crucial region.

Her duties took another turn as 28 July 1958 she departed for the Arctic, where with the nuclear submarine Skate she operated under and around the polar ice pack to gather information in connection with the International Geophysical Year. During these operations, Skate sailed under the Arctic ice pack to reach the North Pole 11 August and continued to cruise freely there repeating the visit 6 days later.

Local operations and exercises, primarily submarine and fleet maneuvers in the Caribbean but also NATO maneuvers, occupied Halfbeak until 1963, when she resumed her role testing and evaluating sonar and other underwater sound equipment out of New London.

James Bamford in Body of Secrets claims that around September 1965, Halfbeak conducted for the NSA a classified SIGINT mission off the Kola Peninsula . She was detected by Soviet forces, and had to hide for many hours below its maximum permissible depth before escaping. These events were omitted from the official ship's history.

Halfbeak was awarded the Battle Efficiency "E" for 1966 and 1967 and held the "E" for Submarine Division 102 for 1968. Halfbeak was decommissioned and simultaneously struck from the Naval Register, 1 July 1971. She was sold for scrapping, 13 July 1972.
