= USS Cobbler =

Submarine of the United States

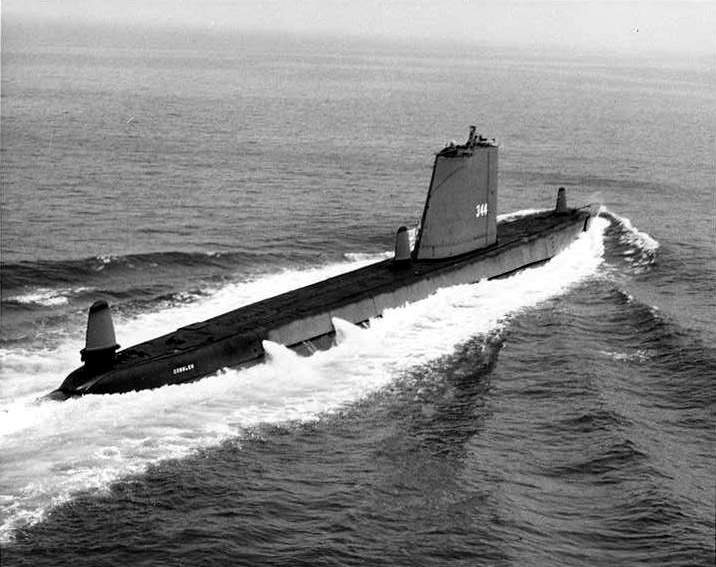
- Cobbler (SS-344), underway, 1968.

History

United States
- Name: USS Cobbler
- Builder: Electric Boat Company, Groton, Connecticut
- Laid down: 3 April 1944
- Launched: 1 April 1945
- Commissioned: 8 August 1945
- Decommissioned: 28 November 1973
- Stricken: 28 November 1973
- Identification: SS-344
- Fate: Transferred to Turkey, 21 November 1973

Turkey
- Name: TCG Çanakkale
- Namesake: City of Çanakkale
- Acquired: 15 January 1974
- Commissioned: 12 February 1974
- Decommissioned: 22 January 1998
- Identification: S-341

General characteristics (As completed)
- Class & type: Balao-class diesel-electric submarine
- Displacement: 1,526 long tons (1,550 t) surfaced; 2,424 tons (2,463 t) submerged
- Length: 311 ft 9 in (95.02 m)
- Beam: 27 ft 3 in (8.31 m)
- Draft: 16 ft 10 in (5.13 m) maximum
- Propulsion: 4 × General Motors Model 16-278A V16 diesel engines driving electrical generators; 2 × 126-cell Sargo batteries; 4 × high-speed General Electric electric motors with reduction gears; 2 × propellers; 5,400 shp (4.0 MW) surfaced; 2,740 shp (2.0 MW) submerged
- Speed: 20.25 knots (38 km/h) surfaced; 8.75 knots (16 km/h) submerged
- Range: 11,000 nautical miles (20,000 km) surfaced at 10 knots (19 km/h)
- Endurance: 48 hours at 2 knots (3.7 km/h) submerged; 75 days on patrol
- Test depth: 400 ft (120 m)
- Complement: 10 officers, 70–71 enlisted
- Armament: 10 × 21-inch (533 mm) torpedo tubes; 6 forward, 4 aft; 24 torpedoes; 1 × 5-inch (127 mm) / 25 caliber deck gun; Bofors 40 mm and Oerlikon 20 mm cannon

General characteristics (Guppy II)
- Class & type: none
- Displacement: 1,870 tons (1,900 t) surfaced; 2,440 tons (2,480 t) submerged
- Length: 307 ft (94 m)
- Beam: 27 ft 4 in (8.33 m)
- Draft: 17 ft (5.2 m)
- Propulsion: Snorkel added; Batteries upgraded to GUPPY type, capacity expanded to 504 cells (1 × 184 cell, 1 × 68 cell, and 2 × 126 cell batteries); 4 × high-speed electric motors replaced with 2 × low-speed direct drive electric motors
- Speed: Surfaced: 18.0 knots (20.7 mph; 33.3 km/h) maximum; 13.5 knots (15.5 mph; 25.0 km/h) cruising; Submerged: 16.0 knots (18.4 mph; 29.6 km/h) for ½ hour; 9.0 knots (10.4 mph; 16.7 km/h) snorkeling; 3.5 knots (4.0 mph; 6.5 km/h) cruising
- Range: 15,000 nmi (28,000 km) surfaced at 11 knots (13 mph; 20 km/h)
- Endurance: 48 hours at 4 knots (5 mph; 7 km/h) submerged
- Complement: 9–10 officers; 5 petty officers; 70 enlisted men
- Sensors & processing systems: WFA active sonar; JT passive sonar; Mk 106 torpedo fire control system
- Armament: 10 × 21-inch (533 mm) torpedo tubes; (six forward, four aft); all guns removed

General characteristics (Guppy III)
- Class & type: none
- Displacement: 1,975 tons (2,007 t) surfaced; 2,450 tons (2,489 t) submerged
- Length: 321 ft (98 m)
- Beam: 27 ft 4 in (8.33 m)
- Draft: 17 ft (5.2 m)
- Speed: Surfaced: 17.2 knots (19.8 mph; 31.9 km/h) maximum; 12.2 knots (14.0 mph; 22.6 km/h) cruising; Submerged: 14.5 knots (16.7 mph; 26.9 km/h) for ½ hour; 6.2 knots (7.1 mph; 11.5 km/h) snorkeling; 3.7 knots (4.3 mph; 6.9 km/h) cruising
- Range: 15,900 nmi (29,400 km) surfaced at 8.5 knots (10 mph; 16 km/h)
- Endurance: 36 hours at 3 knots (3 mph; 6 km/h) submerged
- Complement: 8–10 officers; 5 petty officers; 70-80 enlisted men
- Sensors & processing systems: BQS-4 active search sonar; BQR-2B passive search sonar; BQG-4 passive attack sonar

USS Cobbler (SS-344), a Balao-class submarine, was a ship of the United States Navy named for the cobbler, the killifish of New South Wales.

Cobbler (SS-344) was launched 1 April 1945 by Electric Boat Co., Groton, Connecticut; sponsored by Mrs. J. B. Rutter; commissioned 8 August 1945.

Cobbler arrived at Key West 11 January 1946, for operations locally and in the Caribbean for exercises and training until 27 November 1948. She then sailed for Groton, arriving 1 December for a GUPPY II modernization being completed on 17 August 1949. She departed Groton 24 August for Norfolk, her home port from the time of her arrival, 27 August.

She conducted operations in Florida and Caribbean waters and along the east coast visiting Quebec 10 to 14 September 1953, and returning to Norfolk 19 September. On 27 March 1954 she cleared Norfolk for 3 weeks of operations under the control of the Operational Development Force, cruising with units of the Canadian navy and air force from Bermuda to Nova Scotia.

Her operations in the Caribbean and off the east coast continued, until 6 January 1958, when she departed Norfolk for a tour of duty in the Mediterranean Sea, returning 18 April. She resumed operations off the east coast, cruising to Bermuda in June 1958, and to Quebec with midshipmen embarked in July 1959. From 9 September 1959 through 1960 she was assigned to the Atlantic Fleet's Antisubmarine Development Force.

In 1962, Cobbler became one of only nine boats to undergo the GUPPY III conversion. She had a 15-foot (4.6 m) hull extension added forward of the control room, a plastic sail and the BQG-4 PUFFS passive ranging sonar, which included the three sharkfin sensors on her deck.

== TCG Çanakkale (S 341) ==
Along with Corporal, Cobbler was transferred to Turkey, under terms of the Security Assistance Program in 1973. Both submarines were handed over on 21 March 1973 in New London. Cobbler was renamed TCG Çanakkale (S 341), the second submarine of that name. She was formally decommissioned, struck from the US Naval Register, and sold, 28 November 1973. Arriving in Turkey on 15 January 1974 she was commissioned on 12 February 1974. She was finally decommissioned on 22 January 1998.
