= USS Odax =

Submarine of the United States

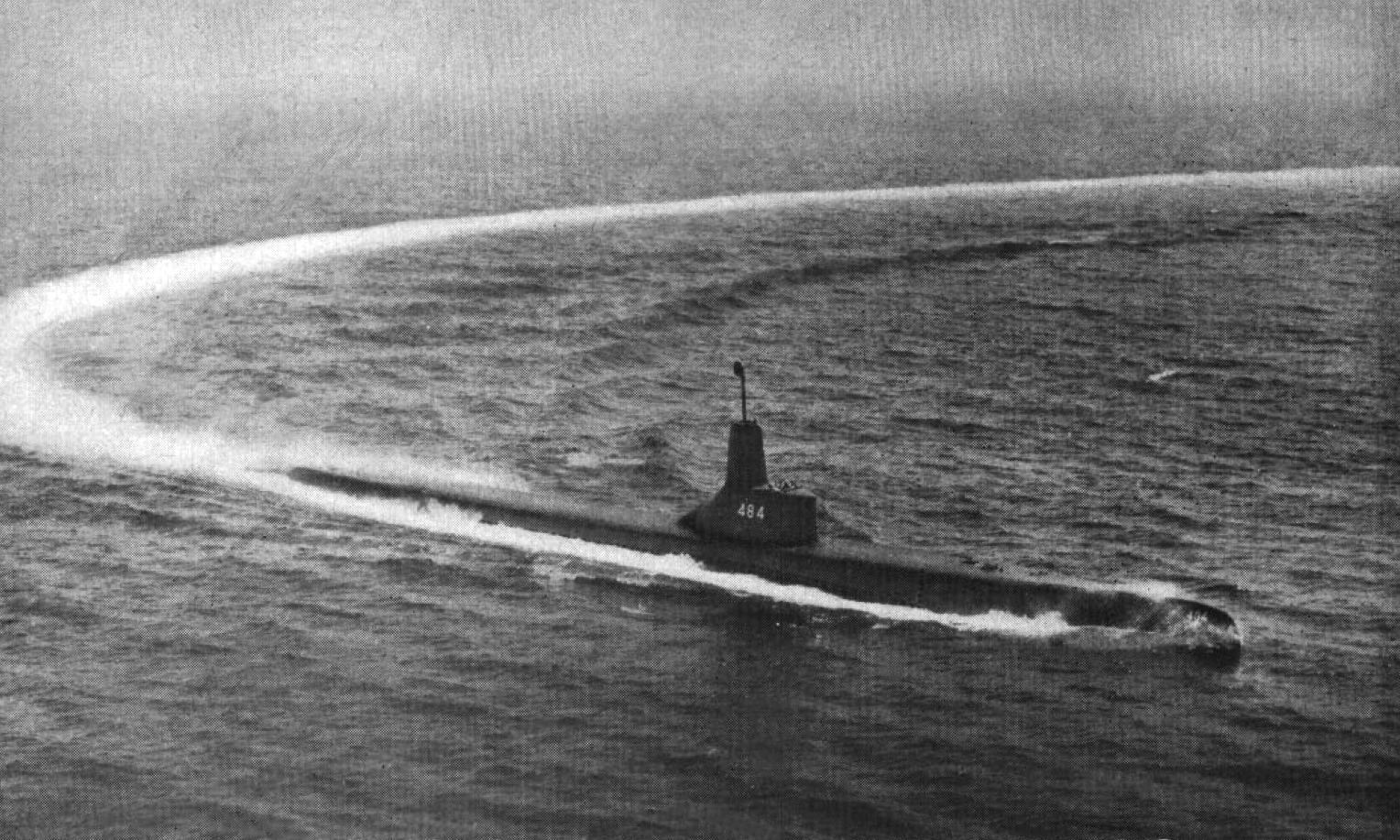

History

United States
- Name: USS Odax (SS-484)
- Builder: Portsmouth Naval Shipyard, Kittery, Maine
- Laid down: 4 December 1944
- Launched: 10 April 1945
- Commissioned: 11 July 1945
- Decommissioned: 8 July 1972
- Stricken: 8 July 1972
- Fate: Transferred to Brazil, 8 July 1972

History

Brazil
- Name: Rio de Janeiro (S-13)
- Acquired: 8 July 1972
- Decommissioned: 1978
- Fate: Broken up, 1981

General characteristics
- Class & type: Tench-class diesel-electric submarine
- Displacement: 1,570 tons (1,595 t) surfaced; 2,414 tons (2,453 t) submerged
- Length: 311 ft 8 in (95.00 m)
- Beam: 27 ft 4 in (8.33 m)
- Draft: 17 ft (5.2 m) maximum
- Propulsion: 4 × Fairbanks-Morse Model 38D8-⅛ 10-cylinder opposed piston diesel engines driving electrical generators; 2 × 126-cell Sargo batteries; 2 × low-speed direct-drive Elliott electric motors; two propellers; 5,400 shp (4.0 MW) surfaced; 2,740 shp (2.0 MW) submerged
- Speed: 20.25 knots (38 km/h) surfaced; 8.75 knots (16 km/h) submerged
- Range: 11,000 nautical miles (20,000 km) surfaced at 10 knots (19 km/h)
- Endurance: 48 hours at 2 knots (3.7 km/h) submerged; 75 days on patrol
- Test depth: 400 ft (120 m)
- Complement: 10 officers, 71 enlisted
- Armament: 10 × 21-inch (533 mm) torpedo tubes; (6 forward, 4 aft); 28 torpedoes; 1 × 5-inch (127 mm) / 25 caliber deck gun; Bofors 40 mm and Oerlikon 20 mm cannon

General characteristics (Guppy II)
- Displacement: 1,870 tons (1,900 t) surfaced; 2,440 tons (2,480 t) submerged
- Length: 307 ft (93.6 m)
- Beam: 27 ft 4 in (7.4 m)
- Draft: 17 ft (5.2 m)
- Propulsion: Snorkel added; Batteries upgraded to GUPPY type, capacity expanded to 504 cells (1 × 184 cell, 1 × 68 cell, and 2 × 126 cell batteries)
- Speed: Surfaced: 18.0 knots (33.3 km/h) maximum; 13.5 knots (25.0 km/h) cruising; Submerged: 16.0 knots (29.6 km/h) for ½ hour; 9.0 knots (16.7 km/h) snorkeling; 3.5 knots (6.5 km/h) cruising
- Range: 15,000 nm (28,000 km) surfaced at 11 knots (20 km/h)
- Endurance: 48 hours at 4 knots (7 km/h) submerged
- Complement: 9–10 officers; 5 petty officers; 70 enlisted men
- Sensors & processing systems: WFA active sonar; JT passive sonar; Mk 106 torpedo fire control system
- Armament: 10 × 21 inch (533 mm) torpedo tubes; (six forward, four aft); all guns removed

USS Odax (SS-484), a Tench-class submarine, was the only ship of the United States Navy to be named for odax, a brilliantly colored, red and green fish belonging to the family Scaridae, the parrot fishes.

== Construction and commissioning ==
Odax′s keel was laid down by the Portsmouth Navy Yard at Kittery, Maine, on 4 December 1944. She was launched on 10 April 1945, sponsored by Mrs. Luise Fogarty, wife of Rhode Island Congressman John E. Fogarty, and commissioned on 11 July 1945.

== 1940s ==
After shakedown off Portsmouth, New Hampshire, Odax got underway 19 September 1945 for Guantanamo Bay Naval Base in Cuba to provide services to the Fleet Training Group. On 30 October 1945, she departed for Key West, Florida, for duty with the Fleet Sonar School and conducted operational training until September 1946.

In September 1946, as part of the Bureau of Ships post-war investigation of the high-speed submarine, Odax was selected for conversion to a Greater Underwater Propulsive Power Program (GUPPY) submarine and returned to the Portsmouth Navy Yard. Completing conversion in August 1947, the first of the GUPPY submarines, she departed for Key West for extensive research development work.

== 1950s ==
In August 1951, Odax again arrived at the Portsmouth Navy Yard for conversion. The major aspect was the addition of a snorkel and redesignation as a GUPPY II submarine. She first put her snorkel to tactical use in a large-scale convoy exercise in the spring of 1952.

From 1952 through 1955, Odax provided services to the Operational Development Force and Fleet Sonar School in Key West and to the Fleet Training Group in Guantanamo Bay. During 1956 she received new equipment of improved design at the Charleston Naval Shipyard and departed in December, bound for the North Atlantic, to operate with the British Fleet. Subsequent operations in 1957 included services to the Operational Development Force, training submariners in the latest tactics of undersea warfare.

In September 1958, Odax deployed to the Mediterranean Sea for a tour with the Sixth Fleet. During this deployment she transited the Suez Canal to participate in a Baghdad Pact exercise in the Arabian Sea.

After her return home, Odax changed home port transferring to Charleston, South Carolina, in February 1959. She sailed from here early in 1960 to return to the North Atlantic for Barrier Patrol.

== 1960s ==
Odax departed Charleston, South Carolina in August 1960 for South America to conduct exercises with naval units of various South American countries during Exercise UNITAS. In December, she returned to Charleston to resume local operations.

Between 1961 and 1964, Odax conducted training operations out of Charleston with interim periods for overhaul and modernization.

In August 1964, she deployed again to South America to participate in combined operations while circumnavigating the continent, returning in December. From 1965 to 1967 she operated out of Charleston.

In May 1967, Odax began a deployment in Northern Europe. Upon her return to Charleston she was awarded the coveted Battle Efficiency "E" for Fiscal Year 1967. She resumed coastal operations in October 1967.

In October and November 1967, Odax provided services to the Fleet Training Group in Guantanamo Bay, Cuba for a period of 8 weeks.

In February 1968, Odax entered the Charleston Naval Shipyard for overhaul and upon completion in September operated in the Charleston area.

In January 1969, Odax participated in fleet operations in the Caribbean.

In March 1969, Odax deployed to the Mediterranean Sea for NATO operations.

In August 1969, Odax conducted training operations in the local Charleston area.

== 1970s and transfer to Brazilian Navy ==
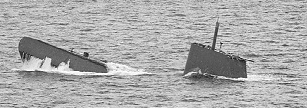
Odax off Norway, in 1970.

In May 1970, Odax departed Charleston for northern Europe for a five-month NATO exercise. During this deployment, while submerged in the Norwegian Sea, Odax learned that her home port had been changed to Key West, Florida.

In December 1970, Odax was awarded the Navy Unit Commendation for her participation in the NATO operations in Northern Europe. The ship was also awarded her second Battle Efficiency "E".

During 1971, Odax participated in extensive tests of the new SQS-26 sonar system. Early in the year she took time out to visit New Orleans for Mardi Gras, and to submerge in the Mississippi River for publicity purposes.

In August 1971, Odax went to Guantanamo Bay, Cuba to provide services for US and NATO training exercises.

In February 1972, Odax again provided publicity services by submerging in the Mississippi River in downtown New Orleans during Mardi Gras.

In March and April 1972, in her last military duty, Odax provided NATO services during a seven-week unsupported deployment to the Eastern Atlantic.

On 8 July 1972, Odax was stricken from the Naval Vessel Register and transferred to Brazil. Commissioned into the Marinha do Brasil as Rio de Janeiro (S-13), she was decommissioned in 1978 and broken up in 1981.
