= USS Pomodon =

Submarine of the United States

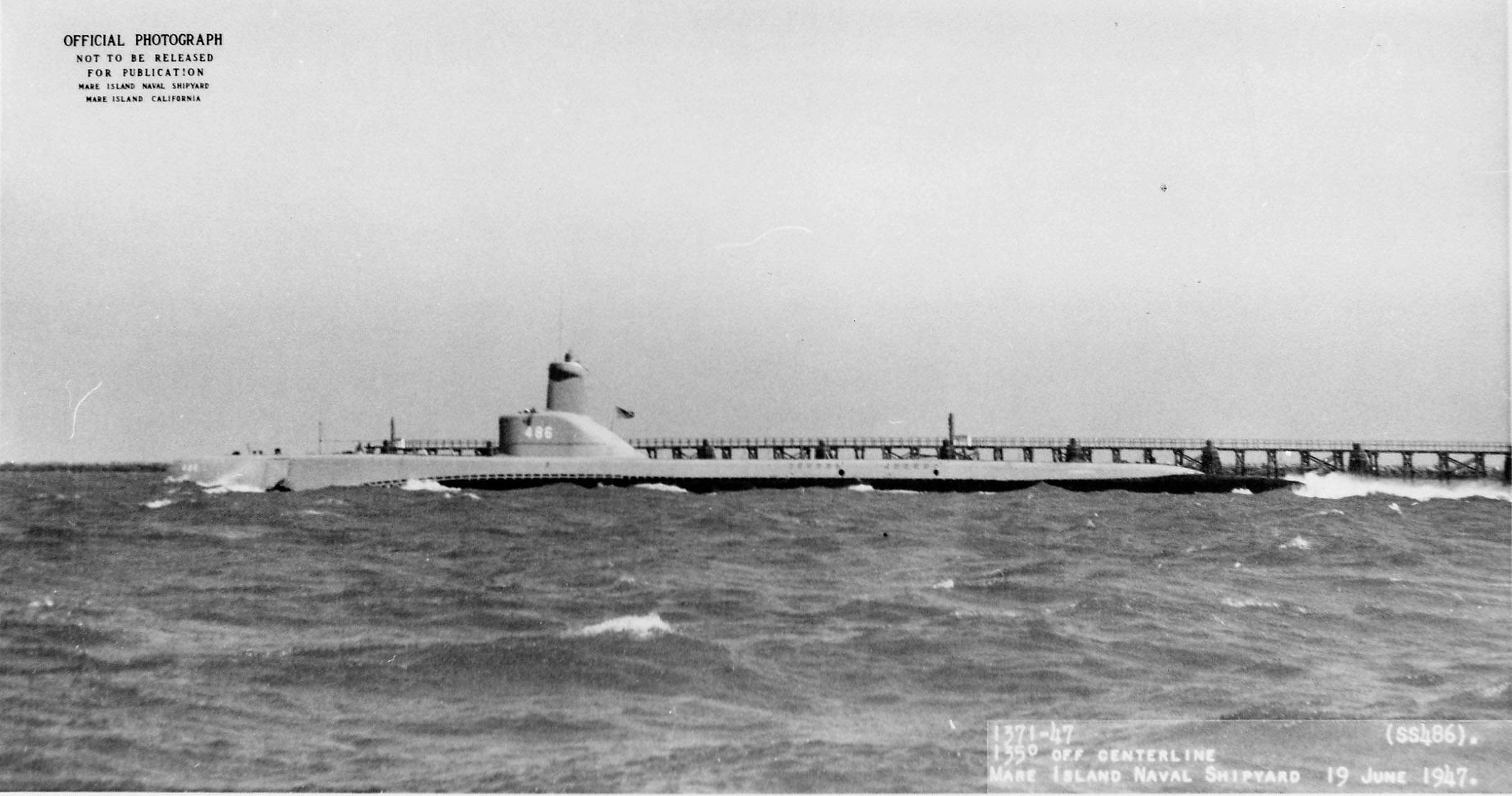

History

United States
- Builder: Portsmouth Naval Shipyard, Kittery, Maine
- Laid down: 29 January 1945
- Launched: 12 June 1945
- Sponsored by: Mrs. Lorena Neff
- Commissioned: 11 September 1945
- Decommissioned: 1 April 1955
- Recommissioned: 2 July 1955
- Decommissioned: 1 August 1970
- Stricken: 1 August 1970
- Fate: Sold for scrap, 26 January 1972

General characteristics (As completed)
- Class & type: Tench-class diesel-electric submarine
- Displacement: 1,570 tons (1,595 t) surfaced; 2,414 tons (2,453 t) submerged
- Length: 311 ft 8 in (95.00 m)
- Beam: 27 ft 4 in (8.33 m)
- Draft: 17 ft (5.2 m) maximum
- Propulsion: 4 × Fairbanks-Morse Model 38D8-⅛ 10-cylinder opposed piston diesel engines driving electrical generators; 2 × 126-cell Sargo batteries; 2 × low-speed direct-drive Elliott electric motors; two propellers; 5,400 shp (4.0 MW) surfaced; 2,740 shp (2.0 MW) submerged
- Speed: 20.25 knots (38 km/h) surfaced; 8.75 knots (16 km/h) submerged
- Range: 11,000 nautical miles (20,000 km) surfaced at 10 knots (19 km/h)
- Endurance: 48 hours at 2 knots (3.7 km/h) submerged; 75 days on patrol
- Test depth: 400 ft (120 m)
- Complement: 10 officers, 71 enlisted
- Armament: 10 × 21-inch (533 mm) torpedo tubes; (6 forward, 4 aft); 28 torpedoes; 1 × 5-inch (127 mm) / 25 caliber deck gun; Bofors 40 mm and Oerlikon 20 mm cannon

General characteristics (Guppy II)
- Displacement: 1,870 tons (1,900 t) surfaced; 2,440 tons (2,480 t) submerged
- Length: 307 ft (93.6 m)
- Beam: 27 ft 4 in (7.4 m)
- Draft: 17 ft (5.2 m)
- Propulsion: Snorkel added; Batteries upgraded to GUPPY type, capacity expanded to 504 cells (1 × 184 cell, 1 × 68 cell, and 2 × 126 cell batteries)
- Speed: Surfaced: 18.0 knots (33.3 km/h) maximum; 13.5 knots (25.0 km/h) cruising; Submerged: 16.0 knots (29.6 km/h) for ½ hour; 9.0 knots (16.7 km/h) snorkeling; 3.5 knots (6.5 km/h) cruising
- Range: 15,000 nm (28,000 km) surfaced at 11 knots (20 km/h)
- Endurance: 48 hours at 4 knots (7 km/h) submerged
- Complement: 9–10 officers; 5 petty officers; 70 enlisted men
- Sensors & processing systems: WFA active sonar; JT passive sonar; Mk 106 torpedo fire control system
- Armament: 10 × 21 inch (533 mm) torpedo tubes; (six forward, four aft); all guns removed

USS Pomodon (SS-486), a Tench-class submarine, was the only ship of the United States Navy to be named for the Pomodon (an obsolete synonym for Hemilutjanus) genera of snapper.

== Construction and commissioning ==
Pomodon′s keel was laid down on 29 January 1945 by the Portsmouth Navy Yard in Kittery, Maine. She was launched on 12 June 1945 sponsored by Mrs. Lorena Neff, and commissioned on 11 September 1945.

== Departure ==
Departing Portsmouth 6 January 1946, Pomodon slipped through the Cape Cod Canal and set her course for the Panama Canal Zone for further training. By May the submarine was back north to New London, Connecticut, for several days operations before an availability and upkeep period at New London.

Slipping out of the Submarine Base at New London, Pomodon set her course southward again; transited the Panama Canal arriving San Diego, California, on 12 October, and joined Submarine Squadron 3. After alterations at Mare Island from 25 October 1946 to 26 July 1947 had made Pomodon the first Greater Underwater Propulsive Power Program (GUPPY) submarine in the Pacific Fleet, the submarine returned to San Diego on 28 July and began operations in the area as part of Task Forces 52 and 56.

== Korean hostilities ==
At the outbreak of hostilities in Korea in July 1950, Pomodon was deployed to Pearl Harbor. In January 1951, Pomodon was again modernized at Mare Island Naval Shipyard and in May 1951 she returned to service as the most modern and advanced GUPPY submarine in the Submarine Force.

Pomodon departed San Diego in November 1951 for a six-month deployment with the United Nations Forces in Korea, followed by operations in the San Diego area. During the next decade, the submarine made six more WestPac deployments.

== Explosion ==
On 21 February 1955, while recharging batteries in the San Francisco Naval Yard, a build-up of hydrogen gas caused an explosion and fire, damaging the submarine and killing five men. TM1(SS) Charles E. Payne earned the Navy Commendation Ribbon with Metal Pendant (later renamed as the Navy Commendation Medal) by his actions in fighting the fire and rescuing the injured. Pasquale Talladino EnD2(SS) received the Navy and Marine Corps Medal. After the third explosion he entered the control room through the conning tower in an attempt to rescue anyone who might still be alive.

== Final deployments ==
On 16 November 1962, Pomodon sank the hulk of ex-Aspro (SS-309). Pomodon's eighth deployment with the Seventh Fleet, 6 June to 30 November 1966, took her to Vietnamese waters and she operated with American destroyers and antisubmarine aircraft carrier USS Kearsarge on Yankee Station. Training operations on the West Coast and overhaul at the San Francisco Naval Shipyard, filled 1967. She again headed west across the Pacific for her ninth deployment on 22 March 1968. She operated in Japanese waters, off Okinawa, and in the Philippines before entering the Vietnam combat zone 13 August. Pomodon returned to San Diego 17 October 1968.

== Disposal ==
Stricken from the Naval Vessel Register on 1 August 1970, Pomodon was sold on 28 December 1971.
