= Greater Underwater Propulsion Power Program =

Post-WWII submarine modernization program of the United States Navy

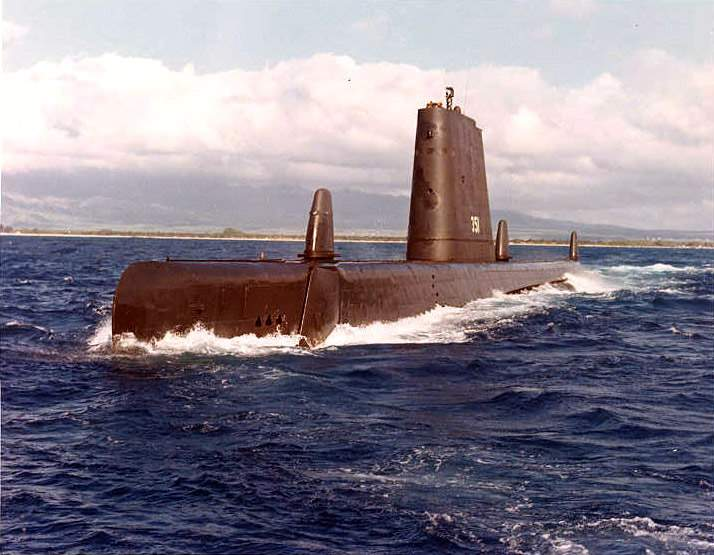
USS Greenfish after GUPPY III modernization. Visible on deck are the three distinctive shark-fin domes of the PUFFS sonar.

The Greater Underwater Propulsion Power Program (GUPPY) was initiated by the United States Navy after World War II to improve the submerged speed, maneuverability, and endurance of its submarines. (The "Y" in the acronym was added for pronounceability.)

The navy began the program by testing and reverse engineering two German Type XXI U-boats—U-2513 and U-3008—obtained as war reparation. That analysis led to four goals—increasing the submarines' battery capacity, streamlining the boats' structures, adding snorkels, and improving fire control systems. The navy immediately focused on designing a new class of submarine, but the Bureau of Ships believed the fleet of existing Gato, Balao, and Tench-class submarines could be modified to incorporate the desired improvements. In June 1946, the Chief of Naval Operations approved the GUPPY project. The initial two-boat test program, implemented by the Portsmouth Naval Shipyard, eventually grew into several successive conversion programs. Those upgrades proceeded in seven variants, in the following order: GUPPY I, GUPPY II, GUPPY IA, Fleet Snorkel, GUPPY IIA, GUPPY IB, and GUPPY III. Some boats that went through an early phase were then upgraded further in a later phase. Most GUPPY phases were assigned a corresponding Ship Characteristics Board / SCB project number.

A similar program for the Royal Navy involved modifications to 24 wartime and post-war British T- and A-class submarines, which were provided with streamlined hulls, fin-type conning towers, and increased underwater performance during 1948–60.

== GUPPY I program ==
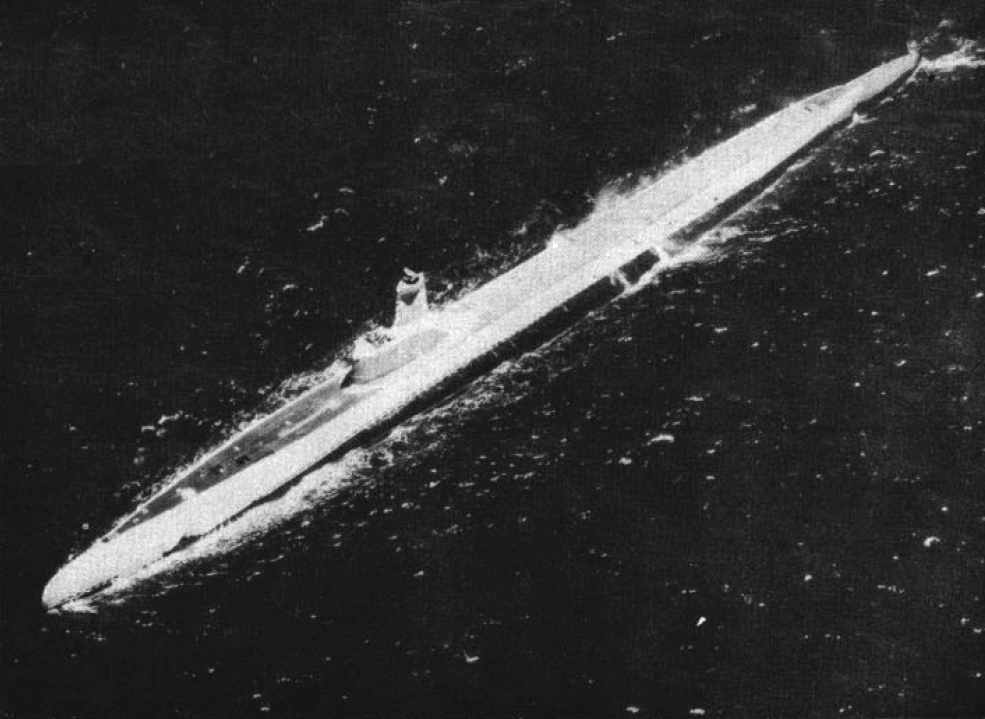
Pomodon after GUPPY I.

The prototype GUPPYs, Odax and Pomodon (both Portsmouth-built Tench boats), appeared in 1947. Externally, they featured improved streamlining of the bridge and shears structures, and periscope and radar mast supports. To reduce hydrodynamic drag, one of the periscopes was deleted. No snorkel was fitted, due to difficulties in adapting the snorkel to the fleet boat. Deck guns and their associated containers were removed. An SV radar aerial was added to the top of the sail, creating a distinctive side bulge. All capstans, cleats, and rail stanchion supports were redesigned so they could be retracted or removed when rigged for dive. Most notably, the sharp V-shaped "fleet boat bow" was replaced with a distinctive rounded "Guppy bow" that improved submerged performance.

These modifications changed not only the boats' appearance, but also their terminology: After a GUPPY conversion, the faired structure around the boat's conning tower and mast supports was called the "sail".

Internally, the boats underwent considerable rearrangement to accommodate larger battery wells and batteries of greatly increased electrical power. The batteries were of a new design. Compared with the original Sargo battery, the Guppy battery used a greater number of thinner plates that would generate higher current for a longer time. However, these batteries had a shorter life, 18 months versus the five years of the Sargo battery, and took longer to charge. They also required ventilation to remove hydrogen gas, and required cooling water to the battery terminals and termination bars. Four 126-cell batteries were installed in enlarged battery wells that replaced former storage, ammunition, and refrigeration spaces. These four batteries could be connected in series or parallel, providing a wide range of voltages and currents, and thus a wide range of speeds.

In the maneuvering room, two or four of the earlier high-speed motors and reduction gears were replaced by slow-speed motors. All open-front switchboards were replaced with enclosed splash-proof cabinets. Lighting and other "hotel" electrical loads were converted to use 120 volt 60 hertz alternating current, and ship electronics to use 120 volt 400 hertz AC. A new air conditioning system of greatly increased capacity was also installed.

In service, these boats offered greatly improved underwater performance. Pomodon reached 17.8 knots (33.0 km/h; 20.5 mph) surfaced and 18.2 knots (33.7 km/h; 20.9 mph) submerged as compared to the previous performance of 20.25 knots (37.50 km/h; 23.30 mph) surfaced and 8.75 knots (16.21 km/h; 10.07 mph) submerged, Odax slightly less.

=== GUPPY I boats ===
- Tench class
  - Odax
  - Pomodon

== GUPPY II program ==
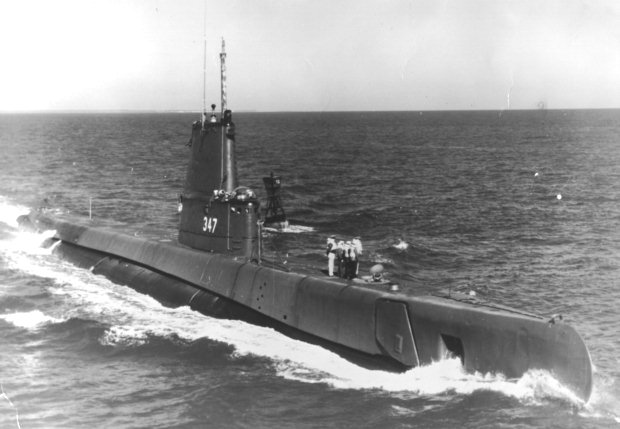
USS Cubera, after GUPPY II modernization

The GUPPY II conversion (SCB 47), implemented from 1947 to 1951, was generally similar to the GUPPY I, except for retention of both periscopes and introduction of the recently perfected snorkel. The addition of three new masts—snorkel induction, snorkel exhaust, and ESM mast—required more room in the upper portion of the sail. BuShips approved two different sail designs:

- The "Electric Boat Sail" had a straight trailing edge, round windows, a wider top and a more rounded forward edge.
- The "Portsmouth Sail" had a thinner top, curved trailing edge, square windows and a sharper lower forward edge. It was put on all boats that used the government plans for the conversion.

Some boats with a Portsmouth Sail had an SV radar and needed extra room to house the aerial, thus had a bulge at the sail top. Later modifications put the SS or SS2 radars on these and other boats that had a smaller aerial and had an indicator with interlocks, allowing the mast to be housed only with the aerial in certain angular positions. Also, some GUPPY II and GUPPY III boats had their sails extended higher above the waterline, the "Northern Sail", to raise the bridge, allowing it to be crewed in more severe weather.

All boats converted during the GUPPY II program that originally had high-speed drive motors with reduction gears had these replaced with low-speed direct-drive motors, producing 2500 horsepower (1.9 MW) per shaft.

The two GUPPY I boats, Odax and Pomodon, were modified to GUPPY II standard.

=== GUPPY II boats ===
- Balao class
  - Catfish (became ARA Santa Fe Argentine Navy)
  - Clamagore
  - Cobbler
  - Cochino
  - Corporal
  - Cubera (became ARV Tiburón Venezuelan Navy)
  - Diodon
  - Dogfish (became Guanabara Brazilian Navy)
  - Greenfish
  - Halfbeak
  - Tiru
  - Trumpetfish (became Goiás Brazilian Navy)
  - Tusk (became Hai Pao Republic of China Navy) active in service
- Tench-class
  - Amberjack (became Ceará Brazilian Navy)
  - Cutlass (became Hai Shih Republic of China Navy) Active in service
  - Grampus (became Rio Grande do Sul Brazilian Navy)
  - Grenadier (became ARV Picúa) Venezuelan Navy)
  - Odax (became Rio de Janeiro Brazilian Navy)
  - Pickerel
  - Pomodon
  - Remora
  - Sea Leopard (became Bahia Brazilian Navy)
  - Sirago
  - Volador

== GUPPY IA program ==
BuShips devised the GUPPY IA (SCB 47A) program of 1951 as a cheaper alternative to the GUPPY II conversion. While the GUPPY IA conversion included most features of the GUPPY II, it omitted the four-well battery configuration and extensive internal rearrangement associated with it. Instead, the GUPPY IA retained the original battery wells, fitted with four more powerful Sargo II batteries. The Sargo II was developed to be lower cost than the Guppy battery while providing most of the performance. It was intermediate in size between the Guppy and Sargo batteries. These batteries featured electrolyte agitation, battery cooling, and open tank ventilation. They also had a longer life than the Guppy batteries, though shorter than the original Sargo battery. The sonar room was relocated from the forward torpedo room to a space under the galley. Compared to the GUPPY II, the GUPPY IA offered lower cost, better habitability, and easier maintenance at the expense of underwater performance.

=== GUPPY IA boats ===
- Balao class
  - Atule (became BAP Pacocha Peruvian Navy)
  - Becuna
  - Blackfin
  - Blenny
  - Caiman (became TCG Dumlupinar Turkish Navy)
  - Chivo (became ARA Santiago del Estero Argentine Navy)
  - Chopper
  - Sea Poacher (became BAP La Pedrera Peruvian Navy)
  - Sea Robin
- Tench-class
  - Tench

== Fleet Snorkel Program ==
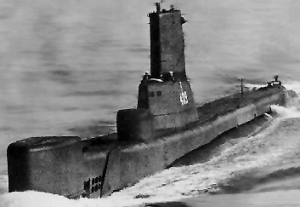
USS Piper with BQR-4A bow sonar

When the navy realized that it would not be able to fund all the GUPPY conversions it desired, it devised the Fleet Snorkel Program (SCB 47B) as a means of adding the minimum necessary modifications to fleet boats. This modernization added a snorkel, a streamlined sail, a higher capacity air-conditioning system, and a more powerful electrical system. The deck guns and auxiliary diesel were removed. Unlike the GUPPY conversions, these boats retained their original deck structure, bow, and storage batteries. Submerged performance of the Fleet Snorkel boats was therefore significantly inferior to any GUPPY conversion. Despite their limited features, the Fleet Snorkel boats served almost as long as the more modern GUPPY boats. Three boats, Piper, Sea Owl, and Sterlet, received a large BQR-4A bow sonar. The ex-USS Chub and ex-USS Brill, both transferred to Turkey in 1948 as TCG Gür and TCG 1. İnönü, were converted to a Fleet Snorkel Submarine in 1953, the work being done first in Turkey's Gölcük Navy Yard and completed in the United States.

=== Fleet Snorkel boats ===
- Gato class
  - Guitarro (became TCG Preveze (S-340) Turkish Navy)
- Balao class
  - Bergall (became TCG Turgutreis Turkish Navy)
  - Besugo (became Francesco Morosini Marina Militare)
  - Brill (became TCG 1 İnönü Turkish Navy)
  - Bugara
  - Carbonero
  - Carp
  - Charr
  - Chub (became TCG Gür Turkish Navy)
  - Cusk
  - Kraken (became Almirante García de los Reyes Spanish Navy)
  - Lizardfish (became Evangelista Torricelli Marina Militare)
  - Mapiro (became TCG Pirireis Turkish Navy)
  - Mero (became TCG Hizirreis Turkish Navy)
  - Piper
  - Sabalo
  - Sablefish
  - Scabbardfish (became Traina Hellenic Navy)
  - Sea Cat
  - Sea Owl
  - Segundo
  - Sennet
  - Sterlet
- Tench class
  - Argonaut (became HMCS Rainbow Royal Canadian Navy)
  - Diablo (became PNS Ghazi Pakistan Navy)
  - Irex
  - Medregal
  - Requin
  - Runner
  - Spinax
  - Torsk

== GUPPY IIA program ==
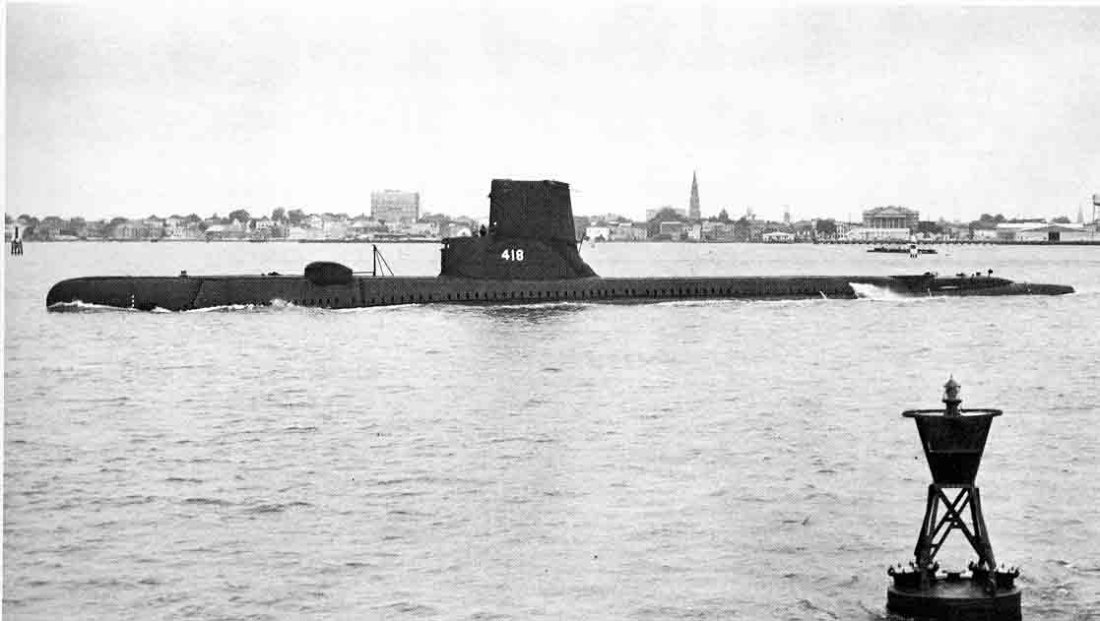
USS Thornback after GUPPY IIA modernization

The GUPPY IA program was succeeded by the nearly identical GUPPY IIA program (SCB 47C), implemented from 1952 to 1954. The GUPPY IIA, however, further alleviated the cramped internal conditions of earlier conversions by removing one forward engine and replacing it with pumps and air conditioning machinery. Some boats had the high-pressure air compressors relocated to the lower level of the forward engine room. The freezer and refrigerator units were moved to the space under the galley, and the sonar room was relocated to the forward end of the pump room. Sargo II batteries were installed in the existing battery wells.

Externally, the GUPPY IIA differed from the GUPPY II and IA by having only three diesel exhaust outlets, whereas the earlier conversions had four.

=== GUPPY IIA boats ===
- Balao class
  - Bang (became Cosme García Spanish Navy)
  - Entemedor (became TCG Preveze Turkish Navy)
  - Hardhead (became Papanikolis Hellenic Navy)
  - Jallao (became Narciso Monturiol Spanish Navy)
  - Menhaden
  - Picuda (became Narciso Monturiol Spanish Navy)
  - Pomfret (became TCG Oruçreis Turkish Navy)
  - Razorback (became TCG Muratreis Turkish Navy)
  - Ronquil (became Isaac Peral Spanish Navy)
  - Sea Fox (became TCG Burakreis Turkish Navy)
  - Stickleback
  - Threadfin (became TCG I Inönü Turkish Navy)
- Tench class
  - Quillback
  - Thornback (became TCG Uluçalireis Turkish Navy)
  - Tirante
  - Trutta (became TCG Cerbe Turkish Navy)

== GUPPY IB program ==
GUPPY IB was an informal designation for a limited upgrade and modernization given to four boats for transfer to foreign navies. These boats had snorkels and were generally similar to the GUPPY IA, except that they were not equipped with the modern sonar, fire control systems, or ESM. The two Italian boats were of the thin-skinned Gato class. The two Dutch boats formed together the Walrus class.

=== GUPPY IB boats ===
- Gato class
  - Barb (became Enrico Tazzoli Marina Militare)
  - Dace (became Leonardo da Vinci Marina Militare)
- Balao class
  - Hawkbill (became HNLMS Zeeleeuw Royal Netherlands Navy)
  - Icefish (became HNLMS Walrus Royal Netherlands Navy)

== GUPPY III program ==
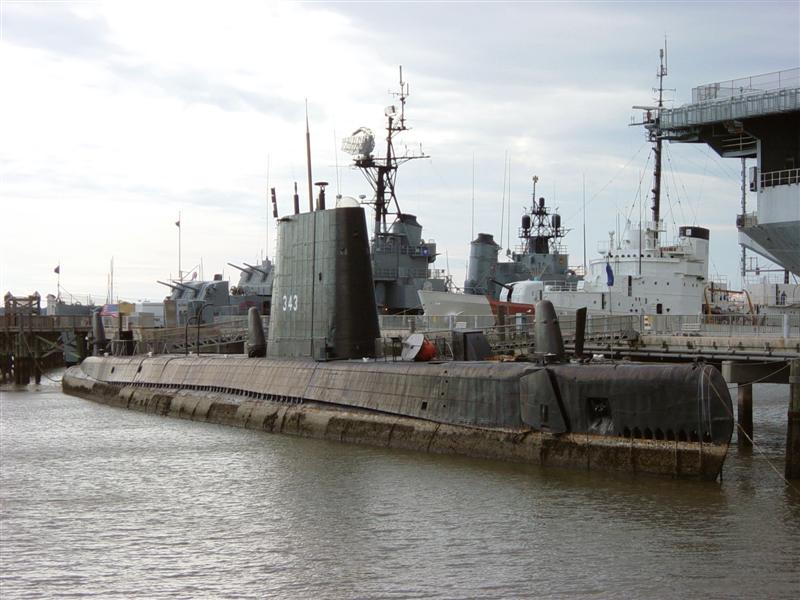
USS Clamagore after GUPPY III modernization, as formerly preserved at Patriot's Point, Charleston, South Carolina.

The GUPPY II conversions suffered from very cramped internal conditions due to the four-battery configuration. The GUPPY III program (SCB 223) was devised to address this problem. In 1959, Tiru became the prototype conversion. It was cut in half and lengthened with a 12.5-foot (3.8 m) section forward of the control room to create space for a new sonar room, berthing, electronics, and storerooms. The removal of the sonar room from the forward torpedo spaces allowed an increase in the number of reloads. Crew spaces were also refurbished. As in the GUPPY IIA conversion, one diesel engine was removed. The tall sail (or "North Atlantic Sail", as they were sometimes called) was a singular characteristic of the GUPPY III boats, distinct from the so-called "step sail" of all of the other GUPPY submarine classes.

From 1961 to 1963, eight more GUPPY II boats were upgraded to GUPPY III standard. These boats differed from Tiru by adding a 15-foot (4.6 m) section forward of the control room. They also retained all four diesel engines. This increased the boat's length to 322 feet (98 m) and raised surfaced displacement to approximately 1,975 tons.

All boats received the BQG-4 PUFFS passive ranging sonar, identifiable by the three shark fin-like sonar domes added to the topside superstructure. The conning tower in the sail gained an additional 5-foot (1.5 m) section to accommodate the Mk 101 fire control system and Mk 37 director. All GUPPY III boats received a plastic sail.

The fire control upgrades allowed GUPPY III submarines to fire the Mark 45 nuclear torpedo.

The GUPPY III conversion was part of the Fleet Rehabilitation and Modernization (FRAM) program. All 24 GUPPY II boats were originally slated to receive the GUPPY III upgrade, but budgetary constraints limited the program to a total of nine boats. Despite their extensive modifications and upgrades, the GUPPY III boats served only slightly longer than the rest of the GUPPY fleet.

=== GUPPY III boats ===
Note – All GUPPY III boats had previously received GUPPY II conversions.

- Balao class
  - Clamagore
  - Cobbler (became TGC Çanakkale Turkish Navy)
  - Corporal (became TCG Ikinci İnönü Turkish Navy)
  - Greenfish (became Amazonas Brazilian Navy)
  - Tiru
  - Trumpetfish (became Goias Brazilian Navy)
- Tench class
  - Pickerel (became Primo Longobardo Marina Militare)
  - Remora (became Katsonis Hellenic Navy)
  - Volador (became Gianfranco Gazzana-Priaroggia Marina Militare)
