= USS Diodon =

Submarine of the United States

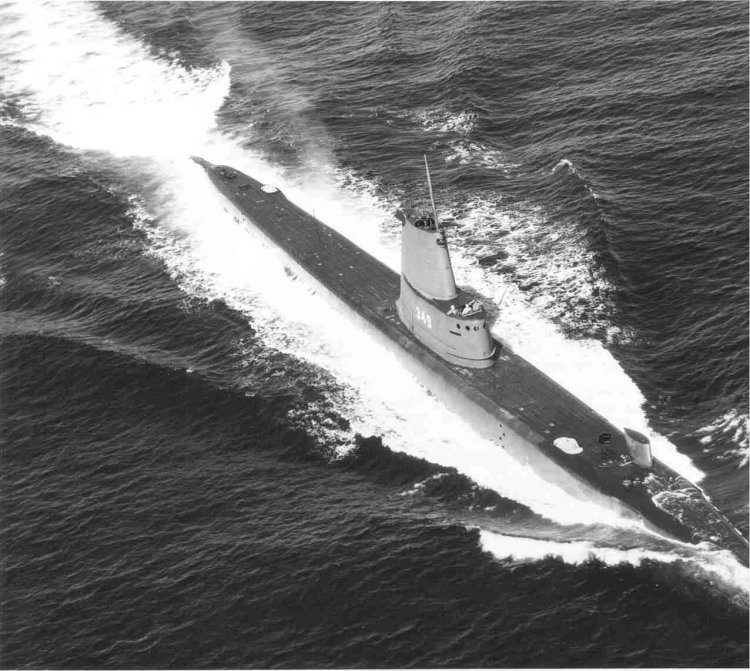
- Diodon (SS-349) after her GUPPY conversion, post-1948.

History

United States
- Name: USS Diodon
- Builder: Electric Boat Company, Groton, Connecticut
- Laid down: 1 June 1944
- Launched: 10 September 1945
- Commissioned: 18 March 1946
- Decommissioned: 15 January 1971
- Stricken: 15 January 1971
- Fate: Sold for scrap, 12 May 1972

General characteristics
- Class & type: Balao-class diesel-electric submarine
- Displacement: 1,526 long tons (1,550 t) surfaced; 2,424 tons (2,463 t) submerged
- Length: 311 ft 9 in (95.02 m)
- Beam: 27 ft 3 in (8.31 m)
- Draft: 16 ft 10 in (5.13 m) maximum
- Propulsion: 4 × General Motors Model 16-278A V16 diesel engines driving electrical generators; 2 × 126-cell Sargo batteries; 4 × high-speed General Electric electric motors with reduction gears; 2 × propellers; 5,400 shp (4.0 MW) surfaced; 2,740 shp (2.0 MW) submerged
- Speed: 20.25 knots (38 km/h) surfaced; 8.75 knots (16 km/h) submerged
- Range: 11,000 nautical miles (20,000 km) surfaced at 10 knots (19 km/h)
- Endurance: 48 hours at 2 knots (3.7 km/h) submerged; 75 days on patrol
- Test depth: 400 ft (120 m)
- Complement: 10 officers, 70–71 enlisted
- Armament: 10 × 21-inch (533 mm) torpedo tubes; 6 forward, 4 aft; 24 torpedoes; 1 × 5-inch (127 mm) / 25 caliber deck gun; Bofors 40 mm and Oerlikon 20 mm cannon

General characteristics (Guppy II)
- Class & type: none
- Displacement: 1,870 tons (1,900 t) surfaced; 2,440 tons (2,480 t) submerged
- Length: 307 ft (94 m)
- Beam: 27 ft 4 in (8.33 m)
- Draft: 17 ft (5.2 m)
- Propulsion: Snorkel added; Batteries upgraded to GUPPY type, capacity expanded to 504 cells (1 × 184 cell, 1 × 68 cell, and 2 × 126 cell batteries); 4 × high-speed electric motors replaced with 2 × low-speed direct drive electric motors
- Speed: Surfaced: 18.0 knots (20.7 mph; 33.3 km/h) maximum; 13.5 knots (15.5 mph; 25.0 km/h) cruising; Submerged: 16.0 knots (18.4 mph; 29.6 km/h) for ½ hour; 9.0 knots (10.4 mph; 16.7 km/h) snorkeling; 3.5 knots (4.0 mph; 6.5 km/h) cruising
- Range: 15,000 nmi (28,000 km) surfaced at 11 knots (13 mph; 20 km/h)
- Endurance: 48 hours at 4 knots (5 mph; 7 km/h) submerged
- Complement: 9–10 officers; 5 petty officers; 70 enlisted men
- Sensors & processing systems: WFA active sonar; JT passive sonar; Mk 106 torpedo fire control system
- Armament: 10 × 21 inch (533 mm) torpedo tubes; (six forward, four aft); all guns removed

USS Diodon (SS-349), a Balao-class submarine, was a ship of the United States Navy named for Diodon, a genus of the porcupine fishes.

Diodon (SS-349) was launched 10 September 1945 by Electric Boat Company, Groton, Connecticut; sponsored by Mrs. D. Cullinane; and commissioned 18 March 1946.

Diodon arrived at San Diego, California, 5 July 1946, and during the next four years joined in training operations along the West Coast, in Alaskan waters, and in the Hawaiian Islands, as well as training members of the Naval Reserve. It received an extensive GUPPY II modernization at Mare Island Naval Shipyard between August 1947 and March 1948.

On 14 September 1950 Diodon sailed for the Far East, rescuing six aviators off Guam during its passage. It trained frigates of the Republic of Korea in antisubmarine warfare in Sagami Wan, Japan, and from 30 October to 28 November made a simulated war patrol. It passed undetected through Tsugaru Strait to Otaru, Hokkaidō, then continued to patrol undetected as it observed and photographed shipping in La Perouse Strait. it returned to the West Coast for overhaul from February to May 1951.

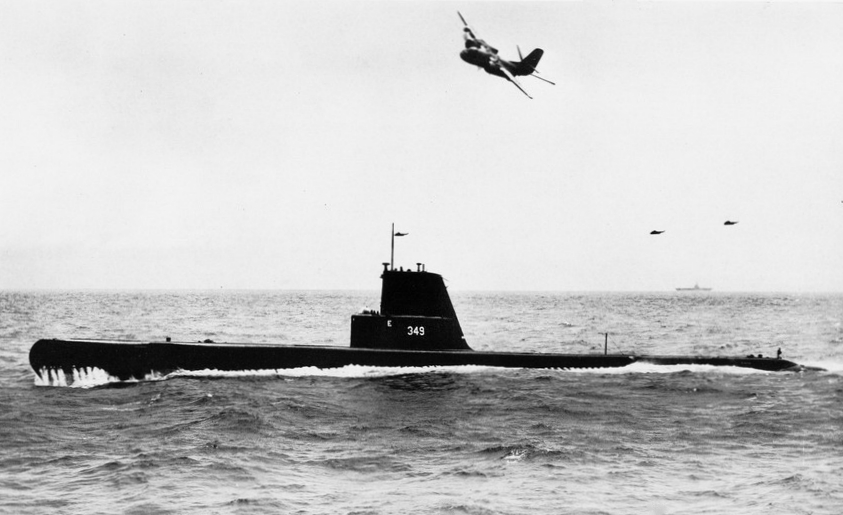
USS Diodon in 1962.

Resuming its west coast operations, Diodon aided in the training of Canadian naval air and surface forces out of Esquimalt, British Columbia, from October to December 1952. It returned to the Far East from March to September 1954, again conducting a surveillance patrol in La Perouse Straits from 24 May to 22 June. During its west coast training operations in the next two years, Diodon again operated with the Canadian Navy, and in March 1956 admitted visitors by means of a submarine escape bell while 130 feet (40 m) below the surface during rescue drills.

During its 1956–1957 tour of duty in the Far East, Diodon visited Brisbane, Australia, for the celebration commemorating the World War II Allied victory in the Battle of the Coral Sea in May 1942. It served again in the Far East in 1958–1959 and 1960.

Diodon was decommissioned on 15 January 1971 and stricken from the Naval Vessel Register the same day. It was sold for scrapping on 12 May 1972.
