= USS Sargo (SS-188) =

Submarine of the United States

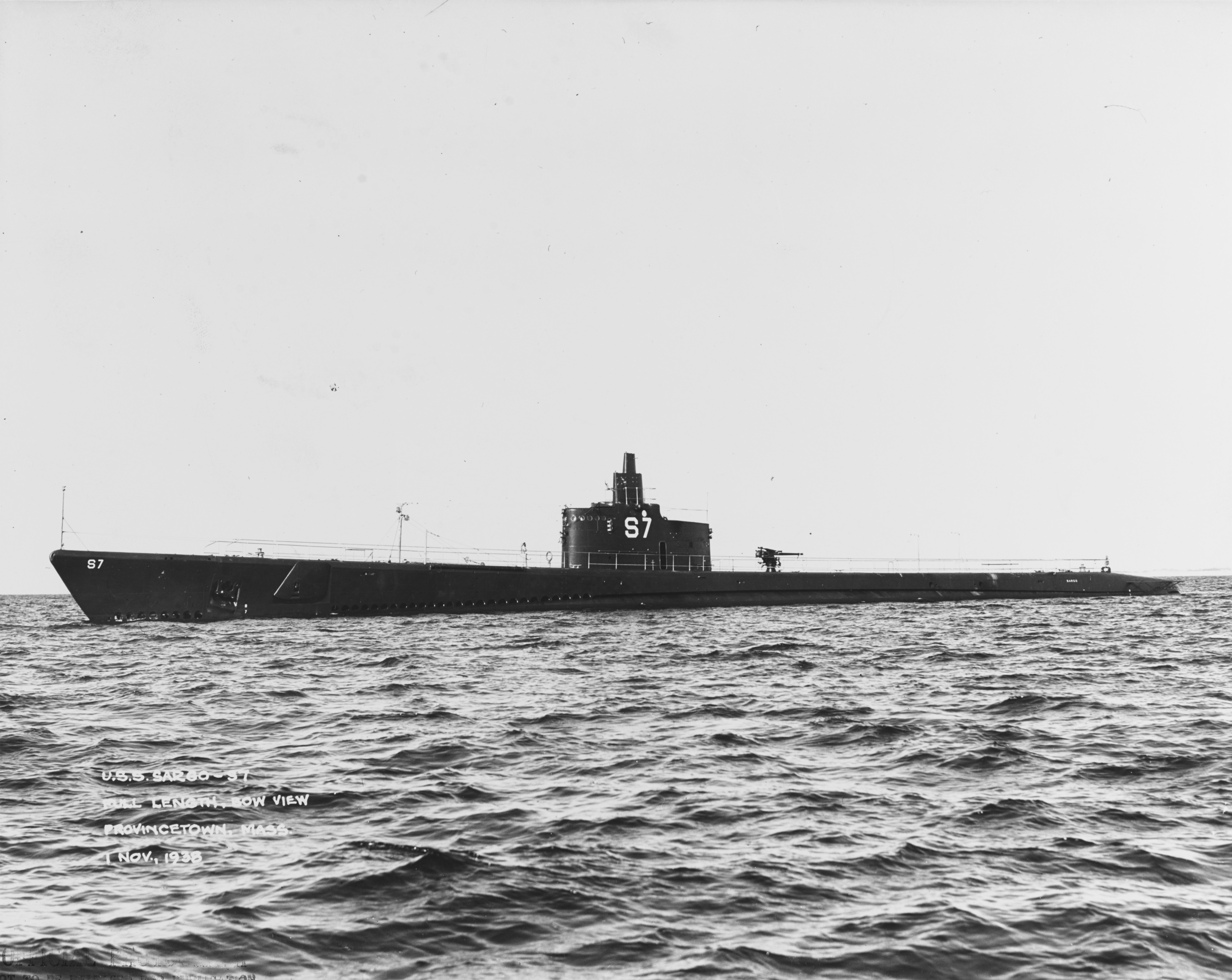
- Sargo during sea trials off Provincetown, Massachusetts, 1 November 1938

History

United States
- Namesake: sargo
- Builder: Electric Boat Company, Groton, Connecticut
- Laid down: 12 May 1937
- Launched: 6 June 1938
- Commissioned: 7 February 1939
- Decommissioned: 22 June 1946
- Stricken: 19 July 1946
- Fate: Sold for scrap, 19 May 1947

General characteristics
- Class & type: Sargo-class composite diesel-hydraulic and diesel-electric submarine
- Displacement: 1,450 long tons (1,470 t) standard, surfaced; 2,350 long tons (2,390 t) submerged
- Length: 310 ft 6 in (94.64 m)
- Beam: 26 ft 10 in (8.18 m)
- Draft: 16 ft 7 1/2 in (5.067 m)
- Propulsion: 4 × Hooven-Owens-Rentschler (H.O.R.) 9-cylinder diesel engines (two hydraulic-drive, two driving electrical generators); 2 × 126-cell Sargo batteries; 4 × high-speed General Electric electric motors with reduction gears; two shafts; 5,500 shp (4.1 MW) surfaced; 2,740 shp (2.0 MW) submerged
- Speed: 21 knots (39 km/h) surfaced; 8.75 knots (16 km/h) submerged
- Range: 11,000 nautical miles (20,000 km) at 10 knots (19 km/h)
- Endurance: 48 hours at 2 knots (3.7 km/h) submerged
- Test depth: 250 ft (76 m)
- Complement: 5 officers, 54 enlisted
- Armament: 8 × 21 inch (533 mm) torpedo tubes; (four forward, four aft); 24 torpedoes; 1 × 3 in (76 mm) / 50 caliber deck gun; four machine guns

USS Sargo (SS-188), the lead ship of her class of submarine, was the first ship of the United States Navy to be named for the sargo fish.

== Construction and commissioning ==
Sargo′s keel was laid on 12 May 1937 by the Electric Boat Company in Groton, Connecticut. She was launched on 6 June 1938, sponsored by Mrs. Catherine V. Nimitz, the wife of Captain (later Fleet Admiral) Chester W. Nimitz, and commissioned on 7 February 1939.

== Sargo batteries ==
The Sargo was the first vessel equipped with a new lead-acid battery designed by the Bureau of Steam Engineering (BuEng) to resist battle damage, based on a suggestion by her commissioning commanding officer, Lieutenant E. E. Yeomans. It quickly became known as the "Sargo battery". Instead of a single hard rubber case, it had two concentric hard rubber cases with a layer of soft rubber between them. This was to prevent sulfuric acid leakage in the event one case cracked during depth-charging. Leaking sulfuric acid would be capable of corroding steel, burning the skin of crew members it came into contact with, and if mixed with any seawater in the bilges it would generate poisonous chlorine gas. This remained the standard battery design until replaced with Sargo II and GUPPY batteries in submarines upgraded under the Greater Underwater Propulsion Power Program after World War II. Each battery's capacity was slightly increased by installing 126 cells instead of 120; this also raised the nominal voltage from 250 volts to 270 volts, which has been standard in US usage ever since, including the backup batteries of nuclear submarines.

== Pre-war service ==
After shakedown along the eastern seaboard of South America, Sargo departed Portsmouth, New Hampshire, in July 1939 for duty with the Pacific Fleet. Transiting the Panama Canal, she arrived at San Diego, California, in mid-August. She operated in the eastern and mid-Pacific for the next two years, including a practice 40-day war patrol between Midway Island and the Marshall Islands in the fall of 1941. She departed Pearl Harbor on 23 October 1941, arrived in Manila on 10 November, and was there when the Japanese attacked Pearl Harbor on 7 December.

== War patrols under Tyrell D. Jacobs ==
The next day (under the command of the torpedo specialist Lieutenant Commander Tyrell D. Jacobs, Annapolis Class of 1927), This submarine got underway for her first war patrol, one that took her along the east coast of French Indochina and to the Netherlands East Indies. Off the major Japanese base at Cam Ranh Bay, ULTRA intercepts directed her to three cruisers on 14 December, but the Sargo was unable to gain position to attack when they appeared as scheduled. Expecting a convoy, she went in closer, and that night detected a freighter, firing one torpedo; it prematured eighteen seconds later. Confidence in the Mark VI torpedo exploder shaken, she switched to contact pistol afterward.

On 24 December, she found two freighters, firing two torpedoes at one, one at the other, from about 1,000 yards (900 m), scoring no hits. Temporarily losing depth control, she broached, and the target turned away; Sargo fired two stern tubes at 1,800 yards (1,600 m), with no more success. The next day, she sighted a pair of merchantmen, but was unable to gain firing position. Some time afterward, she came on two more merchantmen and fired two stern torpedoes at the rearmost of them, from closer yet, 900 yards (800 m); both again missed. By now frustrated, after eight torpedoes with zero results, when two additional merchantmen came in view an hour later, Sargo took extra pains to get it right, pursuing for fifty-seven minutes and making certain TDC bearings matched perfectly before firing two torpedoes at each ship, at an average of 1000 yards; all missed.

After her skipper discovered the torpedoes were running too deep, and correcting the problem, Sargo detected a target at dusk on 26 December losing, then regaining, contact, and running ahead, so be able to get good position. Then weather intervened, and the ships escaped.

A few days afterward, a big, slow tanker gave Sargo another opportunity, and again, the approach was meticulous, firing one torpedo at a close 1,200 yards (1,100 m). It missed. In exasperation, Sargo signaled headquarters, questioning the Mark 14's reliability on an open radio circuit.

On 20 January 1942, she assisted in the rescue of the crew of S-36 after she ran aground on Taku Reef in the Makassar Strait. Sargo remained surfaced, relaying distress messages to friendly aircraft and surface ships. After the rescue by the Dutch merchant ship Siberote, Sargo headed for Java, and arrived at Soerabaja on 25 January.

Here, she offloaded all her reload torpedoes (keeping only those in her tubes) and three-inch ammunition, and took on one million rounds of .30-caliber ammunition desperately needed by Allied forces in the Philippines. She sortied 5 February, avoiding the usual traffic lanes, and arrived in Polloc Harbor nine days later. After delivering her vital cargo to Mindanao, she returned to Soerabaja with 24 Boeing B-17 specialists from Clark Field on board.

Sailing from Soerabaja with 31 passengers from Java on 25 February, she headed for Australia. On 4 March 1942 she was one day out of Fremantle, Western Australia, when a Royal Australian Air Force Lockheed Hudson patrol bomber mistook her for a Japanese submarine and attacked her at 13:38 while she was on the surface at 30°27′S 113°37′E. As she crash-dived, two bombs exploded as she reached a depth of 40 feet (12 m) and lifted her stern out of the water. She went out of control and plunged to a depth of 300 feet (91 m) before her crew could stop her dive, then rose rapidly and broached spectacularly. She again submerged, and a second pair of bombs exploded. One of them detonated over her conning tower as she passed a depth of 50 feet (15 m), destroying the optics in both of her periscopes, damaging her conning tower door, conning tower upper hatch, and most of her lights and gauges, and knocking out all electrical power for 90 seconds. She remained submerged until after nightfall and arrived safely at Fremantle on 5 March 1942.

== War patrols under Richard V. Gregory ==
During March, amid the panic over potential Japanese invasion of Australia, Sargo (now commanded by Richard V. Gregory, Class of 1932) was detailed to guard Darwin's approaches. Nothing materialized.

On 8 June, Sargo put to sea for her fourth patrol, conducted in the Gulf of Siam off Malaya. She attacked only one target, a small tanker, with only three torpedoes, but failed to score, then returned to Australia on 2 August.

The fifth war patrol, from 27 August to 25 October, was in the Celebes Sea and South China Sea. In a submerged attack off Vietnam, French Indochina, on 25 September, she fired two torpedoes at the 4,472-ton cargo ship Teibo Maru. When these did not sink the target, three more were fired; all missed, including one circular, which exploded off her stern, presaging another deadly failing of the Mark 14. Sargo then surfaced and finished off the crippled freighter with gunfire.

== War patrols under Edward S. Carmick ==
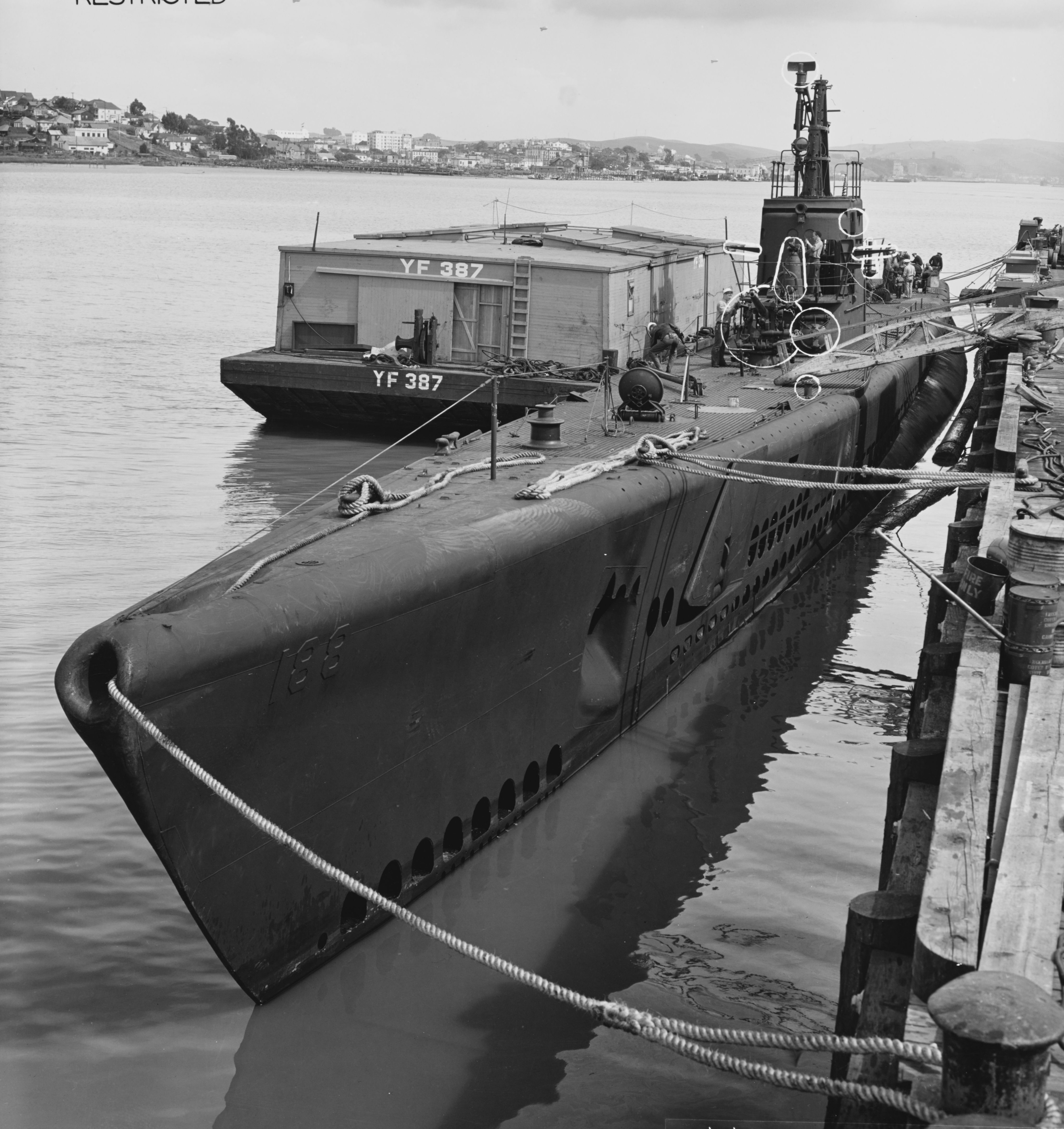
Sargo moored at Mare Island Naval Shipyard, 28 April 1943. Raised metal "188" is seen in faint relief on port bow. White outlines mark recent alterations

On 29 November, she departed Brisbane and conducted her sixth patrol (now commanded by Edward S. Carmick, Class of 1930) en route to Hawaii. On the last day of 1942, she made a submerged attack on an enemy tanker off Tingwon Island, firing a spread of four torpedoes. Heavy explosions were heard, accompanied by grinding noises usually associated with a ship breaking up. JANAC did not confirm the sinking. She arrived at Pearl Harbor on 21 January 1943 and proceeded to San Francisco Bay for a three-month overhaul in the Mare Island Navy Yard.

Returning to Hawaii on 10 May, she departed on 27 May for her seventh patrol which took her to the Truk-Guam-Saipan shipping lanes. On 13 June, she intercepted a three-ship convoy, escorted by a subchaser. That night, she made a submerged attack, sinking the passenger-cargo ship Konan Maru southeast of Palau. The next day, she fired torpedoes at another of the cargo ships but could not learn the results of her attack, since she was forced to dive to escape the subchaser's depth charges. Sargo arrived at Midway Island on 9 July, where she was credited with one ship sunk for 6,600 tons (reduced postwar to 5,200).

She departed Midway on 1 August for her eighth war patrol, again at Truk and in the Mariana Islands. She made no contacts and returned to Pearl Harbor on 15 September for refit.

== War patrols under Philip W. Garnett and post-war fate ==
On her ninth war patrol (now commanded by Philip W. Garnett, Class of 1933), 15 October to 9 December, Sargo operated off Formosa and in the Philippine Sea. On 9 November, she torpedoed the cargo ship, Tago Maru, southeast of Formosa, and finished off the stricken ship with gunfire. Steaming north, she torpedoed and sank the passenger ship, Kosei Maru two days later east of Okinawa. Afterwards, she picked up a Japanese soldier, clinging to floating debris, survivor of another sinking. Sargo returned to Pearl Harbor on 9 December 1943, credited with two ships for 15,900 tons; postwar, it was 6,400.

Sargo’s tenth patrol, 26 January to 12 March 1944, was conducted north of the Palau Islands. Despite ULTRA alerting her, she failed to be in position to intercept Admiral Koga when he appeared. Still, she made four attacks and fired all her torpedoes. She sank the transports Nichiro Maru (6,500 tons) on 17 February and Uchide Maru (5,300 tons) on 29 February; this time, the wartime credit, one ship of 7,000 tons, remarkably, increased.

After refit in Pearl Harbor, the veteran submarine departed on her eleventh war patrol on 7 April, along the southern coasts of Kyūshū, Shikoku, and Honshū. On 26 April, she torpedoed and sank the cargo ship Wazan Maru in Kii Suido, approaching Osaka Bay. She returned to Pearl Harbor on 26 May and steamed east to the west coast of the United States for a major overhaul at Mare Island Navy Yard.

Returning to Hawaii in September, Sargo got underway for her 12th patrol on 13 October and operated off the Bonin Islands and Ryukyu Islands. Two trawlers were damaged by Sargo’s three-inch (76 mm) deck gun and machine guns.

On arrival at Majuro Atoll, Marshall Islands, on 7 December 1944, she was assigned to training submarine crews until 13 January 1945, when she proceeded to Eniwetok Atoll. There she acted as a target for ASW training. As the war ended, she returned via Hawaii to the United States, arriving at Mare Island on 27 August. Decommissioned on 22 June 1946, she was stricken from the Naval Vessel Register on 19 July 1946. Her hulk was sold for scrap on 19 May 1947 to the Learner Company of California.

== Honors and awards ==
- American Defense Service Medal
- Asiatic-Pacific Campaign Medal with eight battle stars for World War II service
- World War II Victory Medal
- Philippine Presidential Unit Citation (Republic of the Philippines)
- Philippine Defense Medal with star
