= I-351 =

I-351 may refer to:

- I-351-class submarine, a class of tanker/transport submarines built for the Imperial Japanese Navy during World War II
- Japanese submarine I-351, an Imperial Japanese Navy submarine commissioned in January 1945 and sunk in July 1945
