= USS Blower =

Submarine of the United States

- Blower underway, October 1944

History

United States
- Name: USS Blower
- Namesake: Blower, a fish of the family Tetraodontidae
- Builder: Electric Boat Company, Groton, Connecticut
- Laid down: 15 July 1943
- Launched: 23 April 1944
- Commissioned: 10 August 1944
- Decommissioned: 16 November 1950
- Stricken: 20 December 1950
- Identification: Hull number SS-325
- Fate: Transferred to Turkey, 16 November 1950

Turkey
- Name: TCG Dumlupınar
- Namesake: Battle of Dumlupınar
- Acquired: 16 November 1950
- Fate: Sunk in collision 4 April 1953

General characteristics
- Class & type: Balao class diesel-electric submarine
- Displacement: 1,526 tons (1,550 t) surfaced; 2,424 tons (2,463 t) submerged
- Length: 311 ft 9 in (95.02 m)
- Beam: 27 ft 3 in (8.31 m)
- Draft: 16 ft 10 in (5.13 m) maximum
- Propulsion: 4 × General Motors Model 16-278A V16 diesel engines driving electrical generators; 2 × 126-cell Sargo batteries; 4 × high-speed General Electric electric motors with reduction gears; 2 × propellers; 5,400 shp (4.0 MW) surfaced; 2,740 shp (2.0 MW) submerged
- Speed: 20.25 knots (38 km/h) surfaced; 8.75 knots (16 km/h) submerged
- Range: 11,000 nautical miles (20,000 km) surfaced at 10 knots (19 km/h)
- Endurance: 48 hours at 2 knots (3.7 km/h) submerged; 75 days on patrol
- Test depth: 400 ft (120 m)
- Complement: 10 officers, 70–71 enlisted
- Armament: 10 × 21-inch (533 mm) torpedo tubes; 6 forward, 4 aft; 24 torpedoes; 1 × 5-inch (127 mm) / 25 caliber deck gun; Bofors 40 mm and Oerlikon 20 mm cannon

USS Blower (hull number SS-325) was a Balao-class submarine in commission with the United States Navy from 1944 to 1950. She was named after the blower, a type of pufferfish of the United States East Coast and West Indies. During World War II, She completed three war patrols, all in the Indian Ocean, Java Sea, and South China Sea.

Blower was transferred to Turkey in 1950 under the Mutual Defense Assistance Program, where she was recommissioned in the Turkish Naval Forces as the second TCG Dumlupınar. Dumlupınar sank after an accident off the coast of Turkey on 4 April 1953 following a joint North Atlantic Treaty Organization training exercise.

== Construction and commissioning ==
Blower′s keel was laid down on 15 July 1943 at Groton, Connecticut, by the Electric Boat Company. She was launched on 23 April 1944, sponsored by Mrs. Richard F. J. Johnson, wife of Commander Richard F. J. Johnson, and commissioned on 10 August 1944 with Lieutenant Commander James H. Campbell in command.

== Service history ==
=== United States Navy ===
==== World War II ====
===== August 1944–January 1945 =====
Following shakedown training off the coast of New England and in Narragansett Bay, Blower departed Naval Submarine Base New London in Groton on 17 September 1944 for advanced training at the Sound School in Key West, Florida. She left Key West on 10 October 1944 bound for the Panama Canal and the Pacific Ocean. Early on the morning of 11 October, during a heavy rain squall, the submarine chaser USS PC-1145 collided with her. No one on either ship suffered any injuries, but PC-1145′s bow was smashed back to the first water-tight bulkhead. Blower suffered a hole in her bow buoyancy tank, damage to her conning tower, and a sheared blade on her starboard propeller. She returned to Key West on 12 October 1944 for repairs, but the damage proved to be so extensive that the work had to be completed at Groton.

Blower got underway from Groton again on 13 November 1944, bound via the Panama Canal for Pearl Harbor, Hawaii, which she reached on 16 December 1944. She spent a month training at Pearl Harbor, then proceeded to Saipan in the Mariana Islands, where she topped off her fuel supply.

===== First war patrol =====
Blower departed Saipan for her first war patrol on 17 January 1945. She spent most of the 48-day patrol in the South China Sea between Hainan Island and Japanese-occupied French Indochina off Cape Tourane. She served as part of a scouting line of 15 submarines stretched out across the South China Sea between Singapore and the Formosa Strait along the most probable track for Japanese warships returning to Japan after an oil resupply mission to Singapore. On 13 February 1945 she sighted the masts of a battleship and two cruisers and, after some maneuvering, managed to fire six torpedoes from a range of 1,800 yards (1,600 m). Her sound operators reported one hit on each of two targets, and she later spotted two oil slicks, but Japanese records do not indicate any damage. She also tried to attack Japanese convoys off Tourane, French Indochina, on 15, 22, and 24 February 1945 but could not get close enough, mainly owing to Japanese air patrols and large numbers of small fishing boats that impeded her efforts. Groups of floating mines often forced her to submerge at inopportune moments, further disrupting her operations.

With her diesel fuel running low, Blower headed for Fremantle, Australia, on 5 March. She arrived at Fremantle on 19 March 1945 and began a refit alongside the submarine tender USS Euryale (AS-22), during which she received new LORAN (long-range navigation) and radio direction-finding equipment and an overhaul of both of her radars and all four of her diesel engines.

===== Second war patrol =====
Blower departed Fremantle to begin her second war patrol on 14 April 1945. After a brief stop to refuel at Exmouth Gulf on the coast of Western Australia, she proceeded through Lombok Strait on 21 April 1945 and took up a patrol station in the Java Sea. On 22 April, she received orders to form a coordinated attack group with the submarines USS Besugo (SS-321) and USS Perch (SS-313). The three submarines set up a scouting line at 20-nautical-mile (37 km; 23 mi) intervals across the east–west shipping routes between Makassar and Borneo and covering the north–south lanes between Borneo and Java. Blower′s only surface contact was with Besugo, with which she rendezvoused twice. Blower also was plagued by numerous Japanese patrol aircraft. Indeed, at 11:30 on 25 April 1944, her lookouts spotted two closing Imperial Japanese Navy floatplanes and she quickly dove to avoid attack. Unfortunately for Blower, the water near Solombol Island was clear and only 150 feet (46 m) deep, allowing the floatplanes to bomb and otherwise harass her for almost two hours as she twisted and turned along the sea bed.

Early on the morning of 26 April 1945, Blower picked up two slow-moving radar contacts at a range of about 15,000 yards (13,700 m). Concluding they were what the Americans called "sea trucks," a type of slow Japanese cargo ferry, Blower closed to engage them on the surface. At 03:22, however, one target turned and increased speed to 19 knots (35 km/h; 22 mph), indicating that she was a warship rather than a "sea truck" and prompting Blower to start bearing away. Ten minutes later, at a range of 12,750 yards (11,660 m), the Japanese ship opened fire with a three-gun salvo, bracketing Blower, with two shots landing within 75 yards (69 m) of her. Blower′s war diarist later noted "On target - this boy had nice radar ranges. Submerged." Blower then maneuvered to try and launch a submerged attack, but the Japanese warship moved in a fast search pattern until heading off to the northwest toward Perch′s position at 05:30. Just over 12 hours later, Blower rendezvoused with Perch, whose commanding officer, Commander Francis B. McCall, said the Japanese warship "had worked him over plenty about noon and put his radar and attack periscope out of commission."

Moving to a nearby patrol position on 27 April 1945, the coordinated attack group cruised off southern Borneo for over a week. It did not find any worthwhile targets, just the ever-present fleets of small native sailboats. At one point, Blower′s diarist wrote "Sailboat in sight. They are even up here. Would certainly like to practice [on them] with the 40 mm's [i.e., Blower′s 40-millimeter guns]."

Turning northwest on 6 May 1945, Blower proceeded to Cape Varella off the Malay Peninsula, arranging for a rendezvous with the submarine USS Baya (SS-318) at 12:30 on 9 May, just after exchanging calls with Perch. The entry in Blower′s war diary reads: "Received mail from Baya. What a commentary on the vaunted Jap[anese] air power in the South China Sea. Three fleet submarines within five miles [i.e., 5 nautical miles (9.3 km; 5.8 mi)] of each other; two exchanging mail and movies, and one proceeding unconcernedly on its way." Targets were no more apparent in her new patrol area than off Borneo, however, and Blower turned to providing lifeguard duties for United States Army Air Forces B-29 Superfortress four-engine bomber strikes on Nha Trang and Saigon in French Indochina on 12 and 21 May 1945. She also conducted a submerged reconnaissance of Vân Phong Bay and Nha Trang Bay on 16 May but saw nothing other than local fishing sailboats. Perhaps the most exciting moment took place on 19 May, when Blower′s crew exchanged recognition signals by flashing light with a B-24 Liberator four-engine search plane which passed 50 feet (15 m) overhead, an event commemorated by the war diary entry "They are damn big and look bigger when they are headed in on you."

Blower headed for the Philippine Islands on 23 May 1945, completing her patrol when she moored alongside the submarine tender USS Anthedon (AS-24) in Subic Bay on the coast of Luzon on 24 May 1945.

===== Third war patrol =====
Following a two-week refit, Blower, now under the command of Lieutenant Commander Nelson P. Watkins, departed Subic Bay on 23 June 1945 to begin her third war patrol, bound for a patrol area in the Gulf of Siam She sighted Tenggol Island off the east coast of the Malay Peninsula on 28 June 1945 and began patrol operations there. She made rendezvous with the submarine USS Bluefish (SS-222) on the night of 30 June 1945, and the two submarines agreed to coordinate their patrol coverage. Taking the area south of the island, Blower sighted an empty lifeboat on the morning of 1 July, sparking an impromptu target practice with the aft 40-millimeter gun. The crew fired eleven rounds, getting one hit at a range of 1,000 to 1,500 yards (910 to 1,370 m), a result memorialized in the war diary as "The practice was justified by the caliber of the shooting. Terrible." Blower then moved "close aboard and let Gunnery Officer have a go at it with grenades. Result - sore arm. No damages. All in all a very sorry exhibition, so secured, leaving lifeboat bloody and sinking."

On 4 July 1945, the two submarines rendezvoused again to lay out a plan to investigate a ship sighting reported by patrol aircraft. Unfortunately, according to Blower′s war diarist, the aviators' plot "of position showed ships anchored in the mountains." Just in case, the two submarines approached the coast of Japanese-occupied British Malaya and, as Blower′s war diarist reported laconically, "had a good look at all possible anchorages and inasmuch as no ships were sighted zoomie [slang for "aviator"] position must have been correct." Later that day three of Blower′s lookouts spotted a periscope at a range of 800 yards (730 m) and closing. Blower′s war diarist later noted the crew were surprised no attack came as Blower dived to escape and wondered if their would-be assailant was friendly. The next day, the British submarine HMS Sleuth reported attacking a large Japanese submarine with no results, suggesting Blower had indeed made a lucky escape.

On the evening of 9 July 1945, after Blower rendezvoused with Bluefish, the two submarines followed, then closed to attack two Japanese submarine chasers off the Malay coast. Bluefish sank one of them, but Blower broke off her attack run when the other submarine chaser turned away. The two submarines surfaced to try a gunnery attack, but the surviving submarine chaser fled into a minefield and escaped.

On 11 July 1945, Blower tried another night attack, this time against a medium-sized vessel she identified as either a cargo ship or an escort ship. She fired three torpedoes at a range of 3,500 yards (3,200 m). Unfortunately, the first two torpedoes, according to Blower′s war diarist, "leapt clear of the water and chased each other off in a direction not that of the target." The third torpedo missed ahead.

Standing eastward the following day to join a coordinated attack group led by the commanding officer of the submarine USS Charr (SS-328), Blower began patrolling near the Natuna Islands. On 15 July 1945, after tracking the Japanese submarine I-351 in the early hours of the morning, Blower fired four torpedoes at the zigzagging submarine from a range of 1,000 yards (910 m). Instead of the expected "blinding flash" though, Blower′s war diarist wrote that ′the crew heard "only a sickly thump followed shortly after by another thump, both loud enough to be heard throughout the boat. The first two had hit - duds." After a short drop down to avoid any torpedoes fired back down her torpedo track, Blower started up to fire her stern torpedo tubes but was shaken by three nearby explosions. Her sound operators reported fast screws nearby and, worried that a Japanese escort had shown up, stayed low until the presumed Japanese escort ship had moved off. Although unsure of what had happened, Blower radioed a contact report, and an hour later was rewarded by a terrific explosion over the horizon. This was followed shortly thereafter by a report from Bluefish that she had sunk I-351.

Following this encounter, Blower shifted to the Java Sea near Batavia, but encountered only sailboats. Those contacts proved nerve-wracking nonetheless, as constant night radar contacts and poor visilibility produced several near collisions. To make matters worse, Blower had at least one encounter with two unidentified Allied submarines, avoiding a friendly-fire incident when she flashed a recognition signal to them. Seeing that the area was overly crowded, Blower passed south through the Sunda Strait to patrol in the Indian Ocean off the south coast of Java. At 13:45, the executive officer remarked "Well, the only thing we need to make the patrol complete is to get bombed." Fifteen minutes later, lookouts spotted an Imperial Japanese Navy Mitsubishi G4M bomber (Allied reporting name "Betty") that dropped two bombs near Blower.

With no targets in sight and low on fuel, Blower headed east and arrived in Fremantle, Australia, on 28 July 1945, completing her patrol. She was still at Fremantle when hostilities with Japan ended on 15 August 1945, bringing World War II to a close.

==== Post-World War II ====
Blower received orders to proceed from Fremantle to Sydney, Australia, and then head for Guam in the Mariana Islands, which she reached on 16 September 1945. She remained at Guam for three months, carrying out a series of training exercises in the Mariana and Caroline Islands. On 11 January 1946, she got underway to proceed to Pearl Harbor. She then continued to San Diego, California, where she arrived on 30 January 1946.

From 1946 through 1949, Blower was attached to the Submarine Force of the United States Pacific Fleet. She operated from San Diego, conducting torpedo exercises, submerged sound school operations, and general training programs. She made a cruise to Yokosuka, Japan, that began on 14 October 1946, and participated in fleet operations near Guam and Saipan before returning to San Diego on 3 January 1947. Blower conducted local operations from San Diego for the rest of 1947, and underwent an overhaul in San Francisco, California, in early 1948. She departed Bremerton, Washington, on 2 August 1948 and, in company with the submarine USS Carp (SS-338), cruised to the waters of the Territory of Alaska, collecting radar and sonar tracking data along the edge of the Arctic ice pack in the Chukchi Sea for use in future submarine operations in the Arctic. Returning to San Diego on 25 September 1948, she resumed routine operations in the Pacific Ocean.

In February 1950, Blower was selected for transfer to Turkey under the terms of the Mutual Defense Assistance Program. On 12 February 1950, she departed San Diego bound for the Philadelphia Naval Shipyard at League Island in Philadelphia, Pennsylvania, where she arrived on 3 March 1950 to begin an overhaul. Upon completion of the shipyard work, she proceeded to Naval Submarine Base New London in Groton, Connecticut, where she arrived on 27 September 1950 and immediately began training her prospective Turkish crew. Blower was decommissioned at Naval Submarine Base New London on 16 November 1950. She was struck from the Naval Vessel Register on 20 November 1950.

==== Honors and awards ====
- Navy Occupation Service Medal with "ASIA" clasp

=== Turkish Naval Forces ===
==== 1950–1953 ====
On 16 November 1950, the day of her decommissioning, Blower was transferred to Turkey, which commissioned her in the Turkish Naval Forces as the second TCG Dumlupınar, named for the Battle of Dumlupınar of 26 to 30 August 1922, and last battle of the Greco-Turkish War of 1919–1922 and the final and defining battle of the Turkish War of Independence. Dumlupınar served in the Turkish Naval Forces for almost three years.

==== Loss ====
Late on the evening on 3 April 1953, Dumlupınar and the Turkish submarine TCG Birinci İnönü (S330) (also sometimes written "TCG İnönü I") started their voyage home to the Turkish Armed Forces Naval Yards in Gölcük, Turkey, after completing their participation in a regular North Atlantic Treaty Organization (NATO) training exercise in the Mediterranean. On 4 April 1953 at 02:10, they entered the Dardanelles (also known as the Çanakkale Strait) en route Gölcük. Ninety-six men were aboard Dumlupınar, 88 of them below deck and eight on deck.

There was a heavy mist in the strait that night, which severely limited visibility. Lieutenant Hüseyin İnkaya was on deck duty when something unseen suddenly and violently struck Dumlupınar off Nara Burnu (English "Cape Nara"), the narrowest (1.2 kilometres (0.65 nmi; 0.75 mi) and deepest (113 metres (371 ft) point of the Dardanelles, as well as the point where the currents are the strongest at up to 5 knots (9.3 km/h; 5.8 mph), versus 1 to 2 knots (1.9 to 3.7 km/h; 1.2 to 2.3 mph) elsewhere in the strait. The force of the impact threw the eight crew members on deck overboard. Dumlupınar′s propellers killed two of them, while another drowned in the ensuing commotion.

The Swedish cargo ship MV Naboland had collided with Dumlupınar, ramming her on her starboard side in her bow torpedo room. Dumlupınar started to take on water in her forward compartments. The collision severed most communications and knocked out Dumlupınar′s electrical power. The 88 men below decks, seeing that Dumlupınar was taking on water from the bow, tried to reach the stern to seek shelter in the aft torpedo room, but many of them perished in the rapidly rising waters. Of the 88, only 22 were able to reach and lock themselves in the stern torpedo compartment. Dumlupınar sank within minutes due to the scale of the damage and a subsequent explosion in her central compartment. The survivors trapped in the stern torpedo room released an emergency communications buoy in the hope of signaling rescuers on the surface.

Shortly after the collision, a small motorboat that had heard the impact alerted a Turkish Government customs ship anchored nearby in the harbor at Eceabat to the incident. When the customs ship reached the site of the accident, her crew saw that Naboland had lowered her lifeboats and deployed life jackets to find and rescue survivors from Dumlupınar and was firing flares to alert rescuers and guide them to the scene. The customs ship took on board the five sailors from Dumlupınar who had survived being thrown off her deck and took them to local hospitals. Three of the hospitalized men died of their injuries on 5 April 1953.

Nobody on the surface was aware of the number of casualties at the time, and authorities called the Turkish submarine rescue ship Kurtaran to the scene. While rescuers waited for Kurtaran to arrive, the sun began to rise, the heavy mist started to clear, and the customs ship spotted the emergency communications buoy the trapped sailors had released. Selim Yoludüz, a second engineer aboard the customs ship, reached for the telephone located inside the communications buoy and read the inscription on it, which said, "The submarine TCG Dumlupınar, commissioned in the Turkish Navy, has sunk here. Open the hatch to establish contact with the submarine." Following these directions, Yoludüz established contact with the sunken submarine. From Dumlupınar′s torpedo room, Lieutenant Selami Özben informed Yoludüz that Dumlupınar was listing 15 degrees to starboard after colliding with a cargo ship, and that the surviving 22 members of crew were locked away in the stern torpedo compartment with no power or supplies. Yoludüz, in turn, informed Lieutenant Özben that Dumlupınar had sunk in the Nara Bay area off Çanakkale and was lying at a depth of approximately 90 metres (295 ft), that the rescue ship Kurtaran was on her way, and that they would do everything they could to rescue the trapped sailors.

Kurtaran arrived at the scene at approximately 11:00 on 4 April 1953, about nine hours after the collision, with Admiral Sadık Altıncan and Governor Safaeddin Karnakçı aboard. Throughout the ensuing rescue operation, Özben kept in regular contact with Yoludüz, as well as the admiral commanding the Çanakkale Sea Forces, Zeki Adar, and the second captain of the submarine Birinci İnönü, Suat Tezcan. The rescuers implored the trapped sailors to keep their spirits up, and advised them to refrain from talking, singing, or smoking in order to preserve oxygen.

Despite numerous attempts by engineers, divers, and United States Navy and Turkish Naval Forces vessels, rescue efforts did not succeed due to the strong currents at the scene and the depth of Dumlupınar, and the morale of the trapped crewmen began to decline. By the afternoon of 4 April 1953, the voices of the 22 sailors were quieting and were being replaced by prayers. Finally, the rescue workers told the sailors, "Gentlemen, now you can talk, you can sing, you can even smoke." Özben responded with a final "For our country," and at approximately 15:00 on 4 April, the cable connecting the communications buoy to Dumlupınar broke, disconnecting the only means of communication between the surface and the men trapped aboard Dumlupınar.

Despite the loss of communications, rescue operations continued, attracting widespread attention from the Turkish public. On 7 April 1953, three days after the accident, it was declared that the rising carbon dioxide levels inside Dumlupınar would by then have killed any surviving crewmen, and the rescue operation was abandoned. At 15:00 on 8 April 1953, a memorial ceremony for the crew of Dumlupınar took place aboard the ship Başaran.

In all, 94 submariners died in the accident due to drowning, bodily injury, or carbon dioxide poisoning. The wreck of Dumlupınar still lies at a depth of 90 metres (295 ft), with the remains of 88 men still aboard.

==== In culture ====
The tragedy of Dumlupınar has inspired numerous songs and tributes in honor of the lost sailors. It is commemorated every year in Turkey on 4 April.
