= Japanese cruiser Isuzu =

WWII Japanese naval vessel

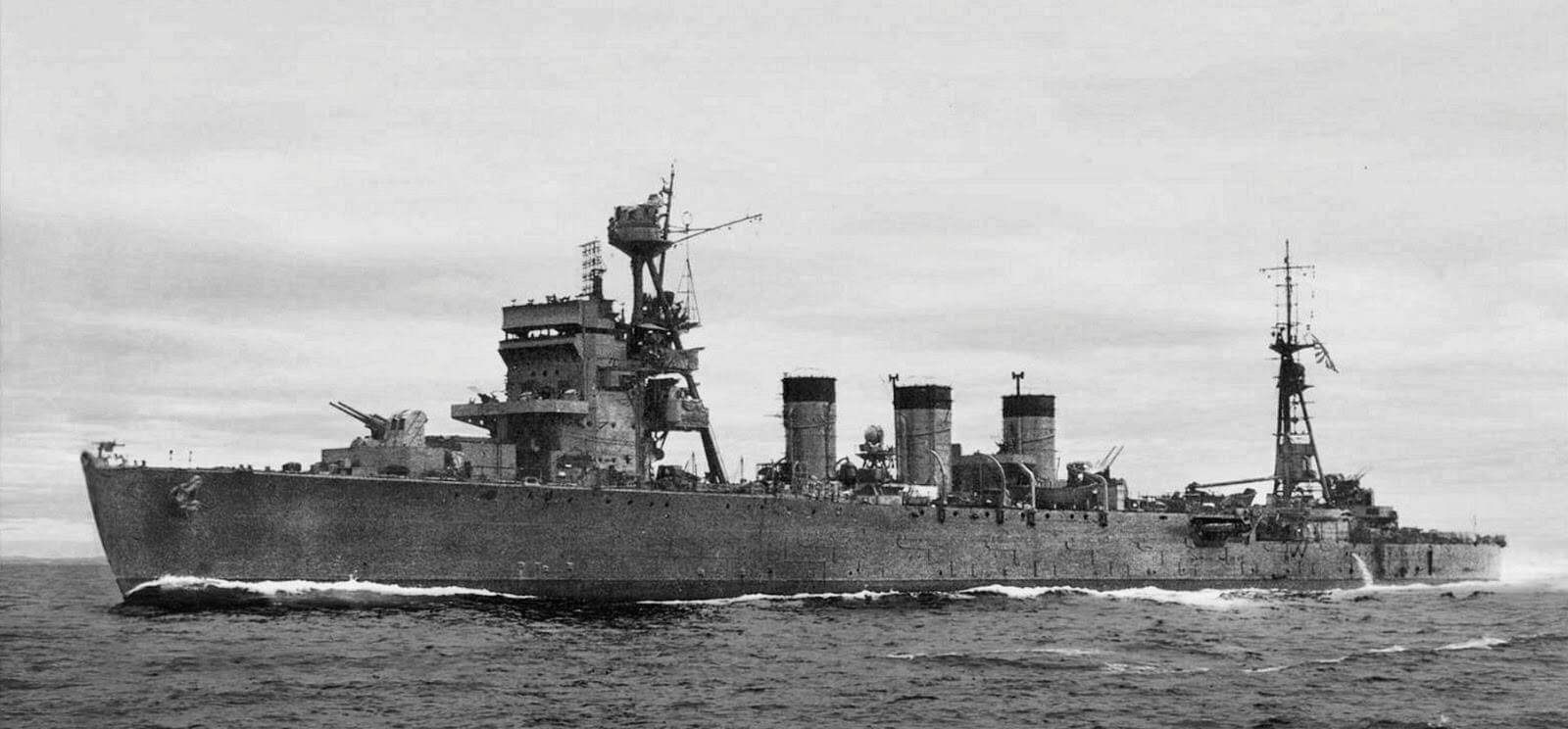
- Isuzu after modification at Mitsubishi Yokohama in 1944

History

Empire of Japan
- Name: Isuzu
- Ordered: 1920 Fiscal Year (1918 "8-6 Fleet" Plan)
- Builder: Uraga Dock Company
- Laid down: 10 August 1920
- Launched: 29 October 1921
- Commissioned: 15 August 1923
- Stricken: 20 June 1945
- Fate: Sunk 7 April 1945 off Sumbawa, Java Sea

General characteristics
- Class & type: Nagara-class cruiser
- Displacement: 5,570 long tons (5,659 t) normal
- Length: 162.1 m (531 ft 10 in) o/a; 158.6 m (520 ft 4 in) w/l
- Beam: 14.2 m (46 ft 7 in)
- Draft: 4.8 m (15 ft 9 in)
- Propulsion: 4 shaft Gihon geared turbines; 12 Kampon boilers; 90,000 shp (67,000 kW)
- Speed: 36 knots (67 km/h; 41 mph)
- Range: 6,000 nmi (11,000 km; 6,900 mi) at 14 kn (26 km/h; 16 mph)
- Complement: 450
- Armament: (Initial); 7 × 14 cm/50 3rd Year Type naval guns; 2 × 8 cm/40 3rd Year Type naval guns; 4 × twin 610 mm (24 in) torpedo tubes; 48 naval mines; (Final) 3 × twin 12.7 cm/40 Type 89 naval guns; 11 × triple, 17 × single Type 96 25 mm AA guns; depth charges
- Armor: Belt: 60 mm (2.4 in); Deck: 30 mm (1.2 in)
- Aircraft carried: 1 × floatplane
- Aviation facilities: 1 × aircraft catapult

Isuzu (五十鈴) was the second of six vessels in the Nagara class of light cruisers, and like other vessels of her class, she was intended for use as the flagship of a destroyer flotilla. She was named after the Isuzu River, near Ise Shrine in the Chūbu region of Japan. She saw action during World War II in the Battle of Hong Kong and in the Solomon Islands campaign, and the Battle of Leyte Gulf before being sunk by American submarines in the Netherlands East Indies in April 1945.

== Background ==
Following the production of the five Kuma-class cruisers, an additional three 5,500-ton class light cruisers authorized under the 8-4 Fleet Program were ordered by the Imperial Japanese Navy in 1920. Due to minor changes in design, primarily due to advances in torpedo technology, these three vessels were initially designated as "modified Kuma-class", or "5500-ton class Type II", before being re-designated as a separate class named after the lead vessel, Nagara. A second set of three vessels was authorized in late 1920.

== Design ==
The Nagara-class vessels were essentially identical to the previous Kuma-class cruisers, retaining the same hull design, engines and main weaponry, with the addition of the new 610 mm Type 93 Long Lance Torpedoes, which required a larger launcher. However, in silhouette, a major difference from the Kuma class was in the configuration of the bridge, which incorporated an aircraft hangar. Initially, a 33-foot (10 m) platform was mounted above the No.2 gun mount, extending over the forward superstructure below the bridge. This was later replaced by an aircraft catapult. Even so, the arrangement proved unwieldy, and the catapult was moved to the rear of each ship in the class, between the No.5 and No.6 gun mounts during retrofits in 1929-1934. Isuzu underwent a number of wartime modifications to increase her number of anti-aircraft guns, and to replace her twin torpedo mounts with a pair of quadruple mounts aft, one each side. From May – September 1944, she was converted into a dedicated anti-aircraft cruiser, during which her entire 14 cm main battery and aircraft catapults were removed, and replaced by three twin-mount 12.7 cm/40 Type 89 naval guns, and a Type 94 high angle fire control system and Type 13 and Type 22 radars were added.

== Service career ==
=== Early career ===
Isuzu was laid down on 10 August 1920, launched on 29 October 1921 and completed at the Uraga Dock Company on 15 August 1923. On 10 June, 1923 while conducting speed trials she sunk a fishing boat in a collision. From August to December 1928, she was under the command of Captain Isoroku Yamamoto, and from November 1929 to December 1930 under the command of Captain Shirō Takasu. Shortly after completion, Isuzu was assigned to patrol duty on the Yangtze River. As the war situation with China continued to deteriorate, Isuzu was sent to patrol the coasts of central China, and to cover landings of Japanese troops in southern China. From December 1936 to December 1937, Isuzu was commanded by Captain Tamon Yamaguchi.

=== Early stages of the Pacific War ===
At the time of the attack on Pearl Harbor, Isuzu was participating in the invasion of Hong Kong, as part of the 15th Escort Squadron in Vice Admiral Kiyoshi Hara's Second China Expeditionary Fleet. Isuzu remained based in Hong Kong after its capture by Japan from the end of December 1941 to April 1942, returning briefly to her home port of Mako, in the Pescadores to escort reinforcements for the Japanese 25th Army to Singora, Thailand and Camranh Bay, French Indochina

The 15th Escort Squadron was deactivated on 10 April 1942 and Isuzu was reassigned to Rear Admiral Kenzaburo Hara's CruDiv 16 under Vice Admiral Ibō Takahashi's 2nd Southern Expeditionary Fleet. She was joined by the Natori and Kinu and was assigned a patrol area in the Dutch East Indies extending from Makassar, Celebes to Balikpapan, Borneo and Surabaya, Java, becoming flagship of CruDiv 16 from 1 May 1942.

On 28 June 1942, Isuzu returned to Yokosuka Naval Arsenal for repairs and overhaul, which was completed in time for Isuzu to participate in the Banda Sea Operation on 26 July 1942, where she supported landing operations of Japanese forces on the Tanimbar Islands.

In August, 1942, Isuzu was reassigned to the Indian Ocean theater, patrolling between Singapore, Mergui, Burma, Sabang Harbor, Sumatra and Penang, Malaya; however, on 24 August 1942, Isuzu was reassigned back to Makassar.

=== The Solomon Islands campaigns ===
On 16 September 1942, Isuzu and Kinu were assigned to escort the first wave of transports with Lieutenant General Masao Maruyama's 2nd Infantry Division from Batavia for the Solomon Islands (Rabaul, New Britain and Shortland Island and Bougainville). From Shortland, Isuzu was ordered on to Truk, in the Caroline Islands, where it replaced the damaged Jintsū as flagship of Rear Admiral Raizo Tanaka's DesRon 2's DesDivs 15, 24 and 31 (9 destroyers).

From 11–12 October 1942, it led DesDiv 31 against Guadalcanal, accompanied by the battleships Haruna and Kongō and aircraft carriers Jun'yō and Hiyō, CruDiv 4's Maya, and CruDiv 5's Myōkō. Isuzu provided cover with DesDivs 15 and 31 and also fired on Marine batteries on Tulagi Island during the Bombardment of Henderson Field, Guadalcanal by Kongō and Haruna.

On 24–25 October 1942, Isuzu participated in the Battle of Santa Cruz, but was not damaged. On 3–5 November 1942, she escorted transports with reinforcements for the 38th Infantry Division to Shortland.

Isuzu also participated in the second Naval Battle of Guadalcanal on 13 November 1942. She sustained two near misses from Marine Douglas SBD Dauntless dive bomber aircraft. Her No. 3 boiler room flooded and her speed was reduced to 15 knots (28 km/h). She was assisted by the destroyer Asashio and returned to Shortland for emergency repairs, probably by the repair ship Yamabiko Maru. Additional repairs were performed at Truk on 20 November 1942, but Isuzu was forced to retire to Yokosuka, arriving 14 December 1942.

At the Mitsubishi Yokohama shipyard, Isuzu was repaired and modified with the installation of a Type 21 air-search radar. The No. 7 14 cm/50 3rd Year Type naval gun was replaced by an unshielded twin 12.7 cm/40 Type 89 naval gunmount. The No. 5 gun was removed. Two triple 25-mm mounts were added bringing the light AA suite to ten 25 mm AA mounts and one quadruple Type 93 13.2 mm machine gun in front of bridge.

On 1 April 1943, with repairs and modification yet incomplete, Isuzu was assigned to Rear Admiral Kenzo Ito's new CruDiv 14 with Naka. Isuzu was finally able to depart Yokosuka on 21 May 1943, returning to Truk with supplies and troop reinforcements on 21 June 1943. She was then assigned to ferry troops for the occupation of Nauru on 25 June 1943. Isuzu continued to be based out of Truk to 15 October 1943, when it was recalled to Tokushima and (together with Naka) reassigned to ferry troops to Shanghai. On 23 October 1943 Isuzu was attacked in the East China Sea by the submarine USS Shad, which fired ten torpedoes, but failed to hit either Isuzu or Naka.

Isuzu returned to Truk on 28 October 1943 and was assigned to escort a convoy of troops for Kavieng, New Ireland. The convoy was attacked 60 miles (97 km) north of Kavieng by United States Army Air Forces 13th Air Force B-24 Liberator bombers, and Isuzu was damaged by a mine laid by the submarine USS Silversides, suffering hull damage forward disabling two gun mounts. Isuzu returned to Rabaul for repairs and was thus in Rabaul harbor during the 5 November 1943 American Carrier Raid on Rabaul. However, the planes from Task Force 38's aircraft carriers USS Saratoga and Princeton did little more than strafe Isuzu, which later returned to Truk for repairs.

=== Operations in South Pacific ===
On 20 November 1943, the United States launched Operation Galvanic to retake the Gilbert Islands. Isuzu ferried troops from Ponape to Kwajalein and Mili (Mille). While at Roi, on 5 December 1943, Isuzu was attacked by Dauntless dive bombers and Grumman TBF Avenger torpedo-bombers from TG 50.1's aircraft carriers USS Yorktown and Lexington. Repairs were conducted at Kwajalein and Truk, but Isuzu was forced to withdraw once again to Yokosuka on 17 January 1944.

While back in Japan, Isuzu was converted to an anti-aircraft cruiser at Mitsubishi Heavy Industries. All of her remaining 14 cm/50 3rd Year Type naval guns were removed and two additional twin 12.7 cm/40 Type 89 naval guns were installed. The number of Type 96 25 mm AA guns was increased to 50 barrels. The catapult and seaplane equipment were removed. Type 13 air-search, Type 21 air-search and Type 22 surface-search radars were fitted or modified. Sonar and depth charge rails were added. On 20 August 1944, Isuzu became flagship of Rear Admiral Heitaro Edo's CruDiv 31 (antisubmarine), and Isuzu was declared combat ready again on 14 September 1944.

=== Battle of Leyte Gulf ===
On 20 October 1944, Isuzu participated in the Battle of Leyte Gulf as part of Vice Admiral Jisaburō Ozawa's Northern Mobile ("Decoy") Force. In the Battle off Cape Engaño on 25 October 1944 – 26 October 1944 Ozawa's force was attacked by TBM-1C aircraft of VT-21 from Task Group 38.4's aircraft carrier USS Belleau Wood and VT-51 from USS San Jacinto. The aircraft carrier Chitose was hit heavily and Isuzu unsuccessfully attempted to take the ship in tow. After Chitose sank, Isuzu rescued 480 survivors. Later the same day, Isuzu attempted to protect the aircraft carrier Chiyoda, which was damaged by a second strike by aircraft from Lexington and Franklin. However, a force of four US cruisers and nine destroyers appeared on scene and sank Chiyoda with all hands. While rescuing survivors, Isuzu itself came under fire from the American units and 13 crewmembers were killed.

Isuzu returned to Okinawa on 27 October 1944, and from there to Kure, where she was assigned to make a troop transport run to Manila and Brunei. On 19 November 1944, 55 miles (89 km) west of Corregidor, Isuzu was attacked by USS Hake and hit by one of six torpedoes fired, with severe damage to its stern and destroying her rudder. After at-sea emergency repairs, Isuzu limped into Singapore for temporary repairs.

=== Operations in the Dutch East Indies ===
After temporary repairs, Isuzu was transferred to Surabaya for more complete repair work on 10 December 1944. When repairs were completed, on 4 April 1945, Isuzu was sent to transport an army detachment from Kupang to Sumbawa Island. She was spotted by a wolf pack with the submarines USS Charr, Besugo and Gabilan, which was joined by HMS Spark. On 6 April 1945, Isuzu was attacked north of Sumbawa by ten B-25 Mitchell bombers of No. 18 (Netherlands East Indies) Squadron RAAF, based at Batchelor Airfield south of Darwin, Australia. Isuzu was slightly damaged by near misses off her starboard bow by some of the 60 bombs dropped. Later on 6 April, she landed troops at Bima Bay, on the northeast coast of Sumbawa. Afterwards, while withdrawing near Flores, Isuzu was hit in the bow section by bombs from B-24 Liberator bombers, from No. 21 Squadron RAAF and No. 24 Squadron RAAF, based in the Northern Territory of Australia. Two B-24s were shot down by Imperial Japanese Army Air Force fighters.

Between Sumbawa and Komodo Islands, USS Besugo fired nine torpedoes at the Isuzu group. Isuzu was undamaged, and one Japanese minesweeper was sunk. The following day, 7 April 1945, 60 nautical miles (111 km; 69 mi) northwest of Bima, Isuzu was struck by one of five torpedoes fired by USS Gabilan. The torpedo hit portside, below the bridge, causing flooding forward. Isuzu's speed fell below 10 knots (19 km/h), she took on a list and settled by the bow. While her crew was performing emergency repairs, USS Charr fired four torpedoes, hitting Isuzu portside twice near the aft engine room. Charr fired two more torpedoes, one of which broke off Isuzu's bow. Isuzu sank at 07°38′S 118°09′E, witnessed by Spark. Her captain and 450 crewmen were rescued; 190 crewmen went down with the ship. On the same day, just a few hours apart, the battleship Yamato and her escorts were sunk by US aircraft in an attempted suicide attack on Okinawa.

Isuzu was removed from the Navy List on 20 June 1945.
