= USS Winnemucca (PC-1145) =

History

United States
- Namesake: Winnemucca, Nevada
- Builder: Defoe Shipbuilding Company
- Laid down: 2 June 1943
- Launched: 27 October 1943
- Commissioned: 1 June 1944
- Decommissioned: 15 August 1955
- Stricken: 1 June 1960
- Fate: Transferred to South Korea 1 November 1960

General characteristics
- Class & type: PC-461
- Displacement: 280 tons
- Length: 173 ft 8 in (52.93 m)
- Beam: 23 ft 0 in (7.01 m)
- Draft: 10 ft 10 in (3.30 m)
- Speed: 20.2 knots
- Complement: 65
- Armament: 1 × 3 in (76 mm)/50 cal; 1 × 40 mm gun; 3 × 20 mm cannons; 2 × rocket launchers; 4 × depth charge projector (K-guns); 2 x depth charge projector (Mousetrap).

USS PC-1145, later USS Winnemucca (PC-1145), was a United States Navy PC-461-class submarine chaser in commission from 1944 to 1955. In 1960, she was transferred to South Korea for service in the Republic of Korea Navy.

== Construction and commissioning ==
PC-1145 was laid down on 2 June 1943 at the Defoe Shipbuilding Company in Bay City, Michigan. She was launched on 27 October 1943 and commissioned at New Orleans, Louisiana, on 1 June 1944.

== Service history ==
PC-1145 completed shakedown training in the Gulf of Mexico on 11 June and reported for duty to the Commander, Gulf Sea Frontier. For the next year, the submarine chaser plied the waters of the Gulf of Mexico and the Atlantic Ocean off the United States East Coast conducting anti-submarine patrols and escorting coastwise convoys, In the performance of those duties, the little warship ranged as far north as New York City and as far south as the Panama Canal Zone.

Early on the morning of 11 October 1944, during a heavy rain squall, PC-1145 collided with the submarine USS Blower (SS-325). No one on either ship suffered any injuries, but PC-1145′s bow was smashed back to the first water-tight bulkhead. Blower suffered a hole in her bow buoyancy tank, damage to her conning tower, and a sheared blade on her starboard propeller.

Following the victory in Europe, PC-1145 received orders assigning her to the United States Pacific Fleet. Early in June 1945, she departed her base at Miami, Florida, and headed via the Panama Canal for the California coast and underwent repairs at San Diego, California, before continuing west to Hawaii. She departed San Diego on 15 July and arrived in Pearl Harbor on the 21st. She did not resume her westward voyage toward the Marshall Islands until 7 August. The submarine chaser reported for duty upon her arrival at Eniwetok Atoll on the 13th, but hostilities ceased the following day.

Nevertheless, the submarine chaser remained in the western Pacific more than a year. For about a month following her arrival, she performed patrol and escort duty in the Marshalls and the Carolines. On 7 September, she departed Eniwetok for a round-trip voyage to Japan, returning almost a month later, on 5 October. The ship then resumed her patrol and escort duties in the Marshalls and Carolines. After a round-trip voyage to Wake Island late in October, she reported to the atoll commander at Majuro in November for duty as station search and rescue ship. That assignment lasted until mid-February 1946 when she departed Majuro for extensive maintenance at Guam.

She completed repairs on 16 June and departed Guam on an inspection tour of the Western Carolines carrying representatives of the United States Commercial Company, a public corporation charged with responsibility for the economic rehabilitation of the Central Pacific region. For the next four months, PC-1145 served the United States Military Government administering the Central Pacific islands and worked hand-in-hand with officials of the United States Commercial Company surveying the region in preparation for efforts to reestablish a viable local economy.

In November, she departed the Central Pacific for her first complete overhaul since commissioning. She entered the Pearl Harbor Naval Shipyard on 21 November and remained there until 23 December. On that date, she reported to the Commander, Fleet Training Center, Pearl Harbor, under whose auspices she conducted refresher training and made a cruise to Hilo. PC-1145 departed Pearl Harbor on 27 February 1947, and on 4 March, arrived at Midway Island where she reported for duty to the Commander, Naval Operating Base, Midway. There, she served as an air search and rescue ship until the end of the second week in May. Relieved by PC-1172 on the 13th, PC-1145 headed back to Pearl Harbor. The warship operated out of the Oahu base conducting upkeep and repairs and serving as a training ship until late July. She then returned to Midway and resumed duty as search and rescue vessel. On 15 November, PCS-1399 relieved her at Midway; and PC-1145 returned to Pearl Harbor for a restricted availability.

For the remainder of her active career, PC-1145 alternated between duty out of Pearl Harbor and service as an air search and rescue ship, at first based at Midway but later at Kwajalein, Johnston Island, Guam, and Samoa. After 1950, however, Guam and Samoa ceased to be duty stations for the submarine chaser and her sister ships.

Duty in and out of Pearl Harbor consisted of repairs, training, target towing, and anti-submarine warfare operations. PC-1145 departed Pearl Harbor for the last time on 19 February 1955 and arrived in San Francisco, California, a week later. Following nearly four months of repairs at Treasure Island, she stood out of San Francisco Bay on her way to Astoria, Oregon, and inactivation. On 15 August 1955, the ship was placed out of commission at Astoria and was berthed with the Columbia River Group, Pacific Reserve Fleet. On 15 February 1956, the submarine chaser—still inactive—was named Winnemucca, after a city in northwestern Nevada situated on the Humboldt River, and the seat of government for Humboldt County. She remained with the reserve fleet until 1 June 1960 when her name was struck from the Navy List. On 1 November, she was transferred to the Navy of the Republic of Korea.
