= USS Gabilan =

Submarine of the United States

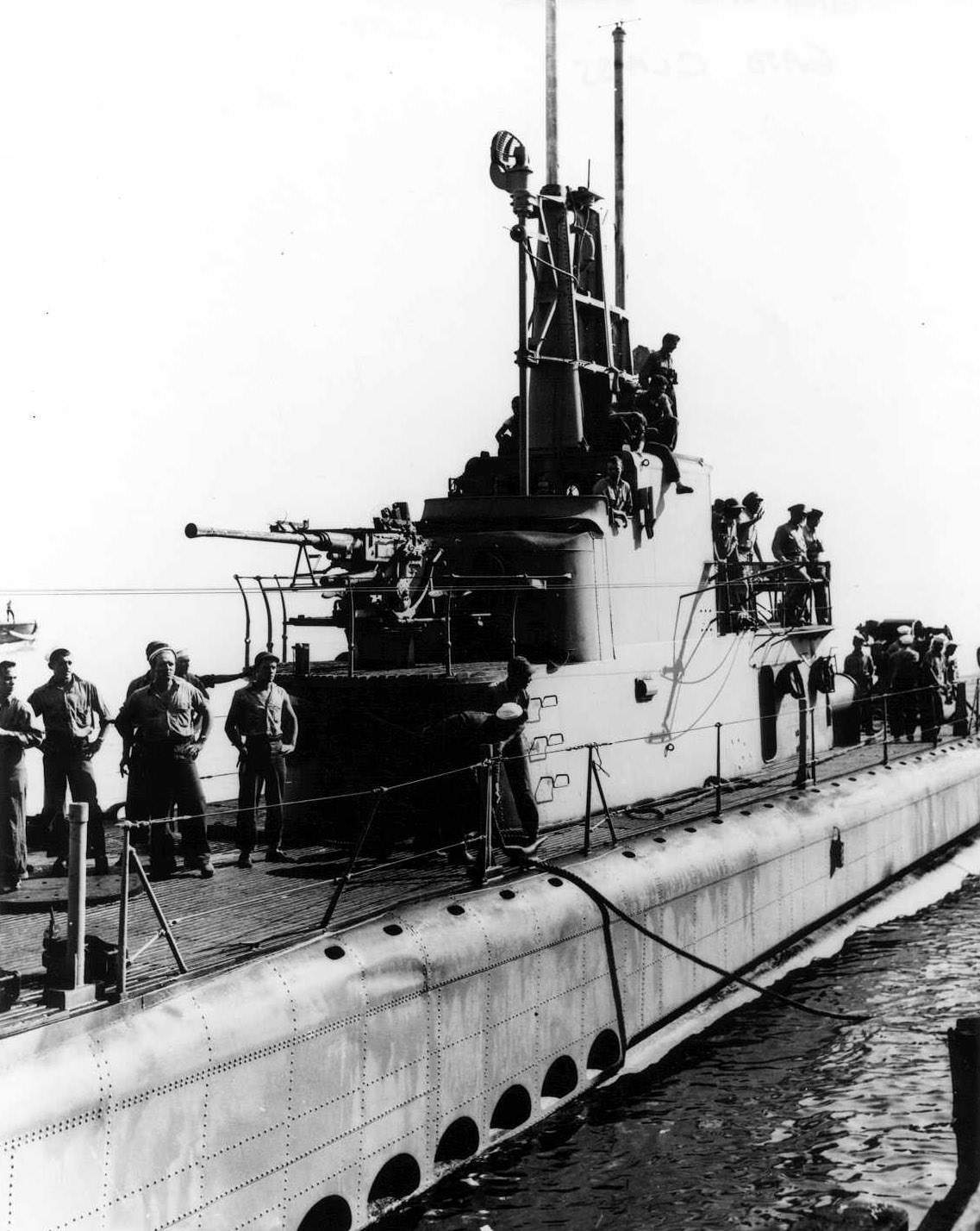
- USS Gabilan (SS-252), probably at Brisbane, Australia, in 1944.

History

United States
- Name: USS Gabilan
- Builder: Electric Boat Company, Groton, Connecticut
- Laid down: 5 January 1943
- Launched: 19 September 1943
- Commissioned: 28 December 1943
- Decommissioned: 23 February 1946
- Stricken: 1 June 1959
- Fate: Sold for scrap, 11 January 1960

General characteristics
- Class & type: Gato-class diesel-electric submarine
- Displacement: 1,525 long tons (1,549 t) surfaced; 2,424 long tons (2,463 t) submerged
- Length: 311 ft 9 in (95.02 m)
- Beam: 27 ft 3 in (8.31 m)
- Draft: 17 ft 0 in (5.18 m) maximum
- Propulsion: 4 × General Motors Model 16-248 V16 Diesel engines driving electric generators; 2 × 126-cell Sargo batteries; 4 × high-speed General Electric electric motors with reduction gears; two propellers; 5,400 shp (4.0 MW) surfaced; 2,740 shp (2.0 MW) submerged
- Speed: 21 kn (39 km/h); 9 kn (17 km/h) submerged
- Range: 11,000 nmi (20,000 km) surfaced at 10 knots (19 km/h)
- Endurance: 48 hours at 2 knots (4 km/h) submerged; 75 days on patrol
- Test depth: 300 ft (90 m)
- Complement: 6 officers, 54 enlisted
- Armament: 10 × 21-inch (533 mm) torpedo tubes; 6 forward, 4 aft; 24 torpedoes; 1 × 3-inch (76 mm) / 50 caliber deck gun; Bofors 40 mm and Oerlikon 20 mm cannon

USS Gabilan (SS-252), a Gato-class submarine, was the only ship of the United States Navy to be named for the gabilan, an eagle ray of the Gulf of California.

== Construction and commissioning ==
Gabilan′s keel was laid down by the Electric Boat Co., Groton, Connecticut, on 5 January 1943. She was launched 19 September 1943, sponsored by Mrs. Eleanor James, wife of Rear Admiral Jules James, and commissioned on 28 December 1943, Commander K. R. Wheland in command.

== First and second war patrols, April – August 1944 ==
After completing its shakedown cruise out of New London, Gabilan sailed for brief antisubmarine training at Key West before transiting the Panama Canal for the Hawaiian Islands. She arrived Pearl Harbor 23 March 1944 and spent her first war patrol (21 April – 6 June) scouting the Mariana Islands gathering information for the United States invasion of those islands. Her second war patrol (29 June – 18 August) took her to the south coast of Honshū, Japan, where, on the night of 17 July, she made a daring radar chase through bright moonlight and phosphorescent water. Skirting dangerous reefs and shoals, she pressed home an attack that sank a 492-ton minesweeper.

== Third and fourth war patrols, September 1944 – February 1945 ==
Her third war patrol (26 September – 12 November) took her south of the Japanese Empire in company with Besugo and Ronquil to detect the departure from Bungo Suido of any major enemy fleet units that might interfere with the liberation of the Philippine Islands. The latter part of the patrol was spent in an independent search of approaches of Kii Suido where, in a dawn periscope attack on 31 October, she destroyed oceanographic research vessel Kaiyō No. 6 with a single torpedo. Gabilan terminated her third war patrol at Saipan on 12 November 1944 and proceeded to Brisbane, Australia for refit.

Her fourth war patrol was in the South China Sea (29 December 1944 – 15 February 1945). She joined Perch and Barbel in a coordinated patrol off the southern entrance to Palawan Passage and the western approach to Balapac Strait, where Japanese battleships Ise and Hyūga were expected to appear en route to threaten American invasion forces in the Philippines. There were many quick dives to avoid aircraft; floating mines were sunk by rifle fire from the submarine, but there was no sign of their quarry.

Passing back through the Java Sea en route to Fremantle, Australia, the submarine had a nerve-wracking morning, as numerous aircraft dropped depth charges in the near vicinity, culminated by the appearance of a Japanese minelayer that made two attacks in shallow water, dropping 20 depth charges. Thoroughly shaken, but suffering only superficial damage, Gabilan evaded her antagonist in a providential heavy rain squall. Her only other diversion en route to Fremantle was an encounter with the British submarine HMS Spiteful, an approaching target in morning twilight; however, there was sufficient illumination to enable Gabilan to identify Spiteful at the last moment before firing.

== Fifth and sixth war patrols, March – August 1945 ==
Gabilan conducted the greater part of her fifth war patrol (20 March – 28 May) as a unit of a "wolfpack" that included Charr and Besugo. Patrolling below the Celebes, the pack began an epic four-day chase on 4 April with a morning contact on cruiser Isuzu and her four escorts. One of the escorts fell prey to Besugo, and the elusive cruiser was spotted as she entered Bima Bay on the night of 6 April. Word was flashed to Gabilan, already executing a daring surface attack that left the cruiser listing and down by the bow. With the enemy confused by Gabilan's attack, Charr completed the kill with a six-torpedo salvo the next morning (7 April). The demise of Isuzu, last of the Japanese light cruisers to fall victim to a submarine torpedo, was witnessed by British submarine HMS Spark.

Gabilan outwitted three escorts to sink a small freighter the morning of 14 April 1945, then scored hits on two cargo ships of another convoy. After a short stay off the coast of Hainan, where she destroyed drifting mines, she returned to Pearl Harbor 28 May for refit.

Gabilan's sixth and last war patrol (20 June – 17 August 1945) was on lifeguard station for American fliers off Tokyo Bay. She first rescued six men, the crews of two torpedo bombers, then raced well inside Tokyo Bay, in easy range of Japanese shore batteries, to rescue another three-man crew. Six Navy Hellcat fighter planes gave her cover for the mission. On the way out, she paused to destroy a drifting mine with gunfire.

On 18 July 1945, the U.S. Navy destroyers USS Hank (DD-702) and USS Wallace L. Lind (DD-703) opened gunfire on Gabilan at a range of 12,800 yards (12,000 m) while Gabilan was on the surface in the Pacific Ocean off the Bōsō Peninsula, Honshu, Japan, at 35°05′N 140°50′E. Gabilan had difficulty diving in the heavy seas and broached, and the destroyers' gunfire straddled her an estimated ten times before she finally submerged undamaged to a depth of 150 feet (46 m). As the destroyers approached, she descended to a depth of 300 feet (91 m) and broke contact with them.

On 1 August 1945, Gabilan rendezvoused with the submarine USS Toro (SS-422) and received three British fliers Toro had rescued earlier. Altogether, Gabilan rescued 17 aviators during her patrol.

== Post-World War II ==
En route to Pearl Harbor, Gabilan received news of the surrender of Japan on 15 August 1945. Proceeding by way of San Francisco, California, and the Panama Canal Zone, Gabilan arrived at New London, Connecticut, where she decommissioned 23 February 1946 and joined the Atlantic Reserve Fleet. She was sold for scrapping on 15 December 1959.

== Honors and awards ==
Gabilan received four battle stars for World War II service. Her second, third, fifth, and sixth war patrols were designated "successful".
