= USS Charr =

Submarine of the United States

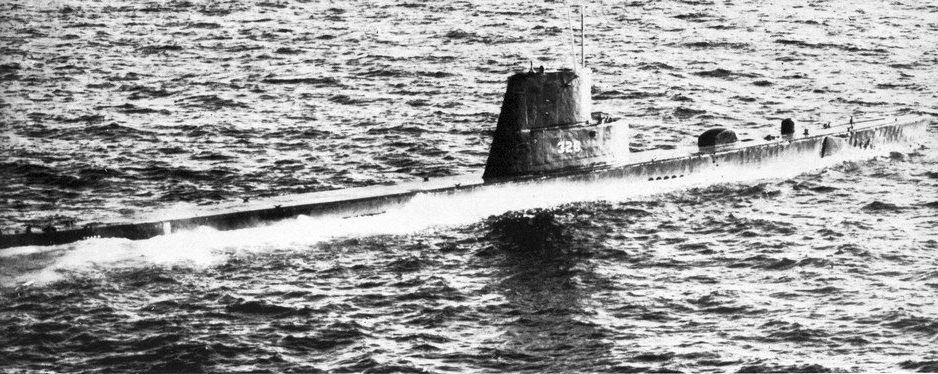
- USS Charr (SS-328) in 1964

History

United States
- Builder: Electric Boat Company, Groton, Connecticut
- Laid down: 26 August 1943
- Launched: 28 May 1944
- Commissioned: 23 September 1944
- Decommissioned: 28 June 1969
- Stricken: 20 December 1971
- Fate: Sold for scrap, 17 August 1972

General characteristics
- Class & type: Balao class diesel-electric submarine
- Displacement: 1,526 tons (1,550 t) surfaced; 2,424 tons (2,463 t) submerged
- Length: 311 ft 9 in (95.02 m)
- Beam: 27 ft 3 in (8.31 m)
- Draft: 16 ft 10 in (5.13 m) maximum
- Propulsion: 4 × General Motors Model 16-278A V16 diesel engines driving electrical generators; 2 × 126-cell Sargo batteries; 4 × high-speed General Electric electric motors with reduction gears; 2 × propellers; 5,400 shp (4.0 MW) surfaced; 2,740 shp (2.0 MW) submerged
- Speed: 20.25 knots (38 km/h) surfaced; 8.75 knots (16 km/h) submerged
- Range: 11,000 nautical miles (20,000 km) surfaced at 10 knots (19 km/h)
- Endurance: 48 hours at 2 knots (3.7 km/h) submerged; 75 days on patrol
- Test depth: 400 ft (120 m)
- Complement: 10 officers, 70–71 enlisted
- Armament: 10 × 21-inch (533 mm) torpedo tubes; 6 forward, 4 aft; 24 torpedoes; 1 × 5-inch (127 mm) / 25 caliber deck gun; Bofors 40 mm and Oerlikon 20 mm cannon

USS Charr (SS/AGSS-328), a Balao-class submarine, was a ship of the United States Navy named for the charr species of fish.

== Construction and commissioning ==
Originally named Bocaccio, SS-328 was renamed Charr on 24 September 1942 and launched 28 May 1944 by Electric Boat Company, Groton, Connecticut, sponsored by Mrs. W. F. Orkney; and commissioned 23 September 1944.

== First war patrol, December 1944 – March 1945 ==
Pacific-bound, Charr cleared New London 5 November 1944, and reached Pearl Harbor 9 December. On 30 December, she was bound for action waters, as she sailed on her first war patrol off the northeast coast of Indo-China. On 29 January 1945, daring to lie at anchor in broad daylight for 4 hours one mile (1.6 km) off the coast, Charr sent two men ashore in a rubber boat to rescue a downed aviator. A second rescue mission came at the close of her patrol, when she escorted the badly damaged Dutch submarine HNLMS Zwaardvisch through the Java Sea and Lombok Straits to Fremantle, Australia, where the two submarines arrived 3 March.

== Second war patrol, March – May 1945 ==
After refit, Charr cleared on her second war patrol, cruising in the Flores, Java, and South China Seas, and along the southern coast of Taiwan. She sailed for part of the patrol in coordination with Gabilan (SS-252) and Besugo (SS-321), and with them conducted an epic 4-day chase of the Japanese cruiser Isuzu and her three escorts. Finally, early in the morning of 7 April 1945, Charr maneuvered into firing position to find Isuzu down by the stern and listing, evidence of successful attack by Gabilan. Charr fired a spread of torpedoes, scoring three hits to send the cruiser to the bottom.

Three days later, 10 April 1945, Charr made contact with another target, a coastal freighter, which she sank on the surface by gunfire. The submarine then headed on for a dangerous assignment, calling for intricate maneuvering, when she laid a minefield off Pulo Island on 14 April and 15 April. She put in at Subic Bay from 20 to 24 April to reload torpedoes, then sailed on to patrol off Formosa on lifeguard duty, during which she rescued one downed pilot.

== Third war patrol, June – July 1945 ==
After refitting at Subic Bay from 21 May to 14 June 1945, Charr put out on her third war patrol, cruising in the Gulf of Siam with three other submarines. At this late date in the war, targets were few, for Charr's sister submarines, as well as air and surface forces, had broken the back of Japan's navy and merchant fleet. The wolf pack however, did find a target in the I-351 on 15 July. After Charr and the other wolfpack members had aided in cornering the Japanese submarine, Bluefish (SS-222) sent her to the bottom.

== Post-war service ==
Charr remained at Fremantle from 26 July to 29 August 1945, then sailed for repairs at Pearl Harbor and training at Guam until 30 January 1946 when she reached San Diego, her newly assigned home port. From this port, she made simulated war patrols to the Far East in 1947 and 1948, operating along the West Coast at other times. On several occasions, she carried members of the Naval Reserve on 2-week cruises, and assisted with training for briefer periods from 1949 through July 1951 when she entered Mare Island Naval Shipyard for a "Fleet Snorkel" conversion which streamlined her appearance and equipped her with a snorkel, thus enhancing her underwater cruising range.

With her conversion completed 19 November 1951, she prepared for overseas deployment, and on 26 March 1952, she sailed to support United Nations forces in Korea, conducting patrols throughout the Far East. She returned to San Diego 2 October 1952 for local operations, which continued to include occasional training cruises for the Naval Reserve.

Charr again cruised in the Far East from 11 June to 7 December 1954, training air and surface forces in antisubmarine warfare, and conducting patrols. On 9 November, she played hostess to Chiang Kai-shek on his first cruise in a submarine. Upon her return to the west coast, she resumed her normal operating schedule, and did not return to the western Pacific again until 22 March 1957 to 14 October 1957. A highlight of her next period of service was an exercise with ships of the Canadian Navy in the fall of 1958, which was followed by preparations for her 1959 Far Eastern cruise, completed between 6 May and 28 October. Through 1960, she continued operations from San Diego.

On 26 September 1961, a broken coupling allowed sea water to flood the engine room of the Charr while submerged to 100 feet 150 miles off the coast of California. Heroic crewmen John J. McGee, EM1(SS) and Douglass Webster, EM3(SS) sealed themselves in the engine room and maintained power to rapidly bring the Charr to the surface. That incident made the news and headlines of the day and the two crewmen received Navy Commendations. Mr. McGee appeared on the panel television show To Tell The Truth on October 9, 1961.

Charr was reclassified an Auxiliary Submarine (AGSS-328) in 1966. She was decommissioned, 28 June 1969, stricken from the Naval Register, 20 December 1971, and sold for scrap, 17 August 1972.

== Honors and awards ==
Of Charr's three war patrols, the second was designated a "successful war patrol", for which she received one battle star.
