= USS Besugo =

Submarine of the United States

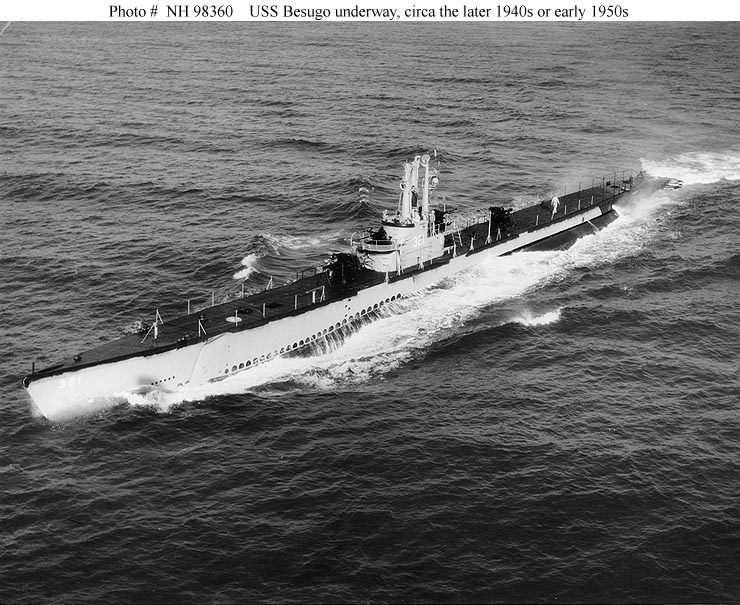
- USS Besugo (SS-321) underway, circa 1950. She has a 5 in (127 mm)/25 caliber deck gun fore and aft her conning tower. Water can be seen draining from her limber holes.

History

United States
- Name: USS Besugo (SS-321)
- Namesake: Besugo
- Builder: Electric Boat Company, Groton, Connecticut
- Laid down: 27 May 1943
- Launched: 27 February 1944
- Commissioned: 19 June 1944
- Decommissioned: 21 March 1958
- Recommissioned: 15 June 1965
- Decommissioned: 31 March 1966
- Stricken: 15 November 1975
- Fate: Transferred to Italy 31 March 1966; Returned 15 November 1975; Sold for scrap 16 April 1976 or 20 June 1977

History

Italy
- Name: Francesco Morosini (S 508)
- Namesake: Francesco Morosini (1619–1694), Doge of Venice (1688–1694)
- Acquired: 31 March 1966
- Decommissioned: 30 November 1973
- Stricken: 15 November 1975
- Fate: Returned to United States 15 November 1975

General characteristics
- Class & type: Balao class diesel-electric submarine
- Displacement: 1,526 tons (1,550 t) surfaced; 2,424 tons (2,463 t) submerged
- Length: 311 ft 9 in (95.02 m)
- Beam: 27 ft 3 in (8.31 m)
- Draft: 16 ft 10 in (5.13 m) maximum
- Propulsion: 4 × General Motors Model 16-278A V16 diesel engines driving electrical generators; 2 × 126-cell Sargo batteries; 4 × high-speed General Electric electric motors with reduction gears; 2 × propellers; 5,400 shp (4.0 MW) surfaced; 2,740 shp (2.0 MW) submerged
- Speed: 20.25 knots (38 km/h) surfaced; 8.75 knots (16 km/h) submerged
- Range: 11,000 nautical miles (20,000 km) surfaced at 10 knots (19 km/h)
- Endurance: 48 hours at 2 knots (3.7 km/h) submerged; 75 days on patrol
- Test depth: 400 ft (120 m)
- Complement: 10 officers, 70–71 enlisted
- Armament: 10 × 21-inch (533 mm) torpedo tubes; 6 forward, 4 aft; 24 torpedoes; 1 × 5-inch (127 mm) / 25 caliber deck gun; Bofors 40 mm and Oerlikon 20 mm cannon

USS Besugo (SS-321, later AGSS-321), a Balao-class submarine, was a ship of the United States Navy in commission from 1944 to 1958. She was named for the besugo.

During World War II, Besugo made five war patrols between 26 September 1944 and 25 July 1945, operating in the Bungo Channel, Makassar Strait, Java Sea, and South China Sea. During these patrols, Besugo sank the German submarine U-183, becoming one of a very few U.S. submarines to sink a German naval vessel during the war. She also sank the 10,020-gross register ton tanker Nichei Maru, one landing ship, one frigate, and a minesweeper.

After post-World War II Korean War and Cold War U.S. Navy service, Besugo was decommissioned. She was loaned to the Italian Navy in 1966, in which she served until 1973 as Francesco Morosini (S 508).

== Construction and commissioning ==
Besugo′s keel was laid down on 27 May 1943 at Groton, Connecticut, by the Electric Boat Company. She was launched on 27 February 1944, sponsored by Mrs. Margaret Perry Homer, an employee in the Outside Machinist's Department of the Electric Boat Company and wife of Peter J. Homer, also an employee of the company. Besugo was commissioned at Naval Submarine Base New London in Groton on 19 June 1944 with Commander Thomas L. Wogan in command.

== Service history ==
=== United States Navy ===
==== World War II ====
===== June–September 1944 =====
Besugo completed shakedown training in the waters off New London, Connecticut, before heading south on 25 July 1944. Arriving at Key West, Florida, on 1 August 1944, she conducted another two weeks of training with the Key West Sound School before setting out for the Pacific Ocean on 13 August. She transited the Panama Canal on 17 August and, after five days of repairs at Balboa in the Panama Canal Zone, continued on to Pearl Harbor in the Territory of Hawaii, arriving there on 7 September 1944. She spent the next two weeks training in the waters of the Hawaiian Islands.

===== First war patrol =====
Besugo put to sea from Pearl Harbor for her first war patrol on 26 September 1944, escorted until dark by the submarine chaser USS PC-486. In company with the submarine USS Gabilan (SS-252), Besugo headed west and stopped at Midway Atoll in the Northwestern Hawaiian Islands to refuel on 30 September. Departing Midway the same day, the two submarines rendezvoused with the submarine USS Ronquil (SS-396) before heading northwest to the Bungo Channel entrance to Japan's Seto Inland Sea.

While en route on 6 October 1944, the submarines spotted a picket boat — a small Japanese patrol boat — lying to northwest of Marcus Island. As Besugo closed to destroy the patrol boat, Gabilan and Ronquil continued on course. At 21:02, Besugo fired three torpedoes at the target. All missed, probably because of the shallow draft of the patrol boat. After waiting for night to fall, Besugo circled the target, surfaced, and closed for a gun attack at 22:28. Although the combination of light swells and insufficient moonlight made 5-inch (127 mm) gunfire ineffective, the two 20-millimeter guns scored some hits. The Japanese patrol boat responded with sporadic bursts of light machine-gun fire. Just as the patrol boat closed the range, both of Besugo′s 20-millimeter guns jammed. The Japanese picket boat then opened fire with a heavy machine gun. Bullets began striking the water around Besugo, and several struck her conning tower and periscope shears. Splinters from these hits wounded the gunnery officer and a lookout. Unable to return fire effectively, Besugo withdrew, leading her commanding officer to remark, "Not an auspicious beginning to our fighting career."

On 8 October 1944, Besugo spotted an Imperial Japanese Navy Mitsubishi G4M Type 1 bomber (Allied reporting name "Betty") and submerged for the remainder of the day. On the morning of 9 October, a patrolling Japanese armed trawler forced her to submerge, further delaying her progress. Then, at 03:29 on 10 October, her radar indicated a Japanese patrol plane was pursuing her. As put by her war diarist, it took half an hour of "nerve-wracking" maneuvering to shake off the Japanese plane.

At dawn on 10 October 1944, Besugo reached her patrol station and began a submerged daylight patrol in the eastern approaches to the Bungo Channel. Owing to the upcoming U.S. landings on Leyte in the Philippine Islands, scheduled for 20 October, Besugo had orders to spot any Japanese heavy fleet units departing the Bungo Channel and to refrain from firing at any targets until after sending in a contact report. On the morning of 15 October 1944, she watched as five Japanese cruisers and a destroyer steamed by her position before she radioed in a contact report that evening.

On the evening of 16 October 1944, Besugo′s radar picked up two targets transiting the Bungo Channel. Believing they were heavy cruisers, Besugo maneuvered into firing position and loosed six bow torpedoes at the nearest target. Two minutes later, at 22:12, one torpedo hit one of the Japanese warships just abaft the bridge. The Japanese ships "milled about," according to Besugo′s war diary, for a few minutes, during which time Besugo retired to reload, but the Japanese quickly skirted the coast of Kyushu and turned for home. Besugo tracked them for almost two hours but was unable to close for another attack. A postwar review of records indicated that the damaged ship actually was the destroyer Suzutsuki.

On 18 October 1944, Besugo spotted two more warships, this time entering the Bungo Channel rather than leaving it, and noted the contacts in accordance with her orders. Although Japanese air patrols increased noticeably over the next few days, including one radar-equipped search plane that kept Besugo pinned down on 22 October, Besugo and Ronquil did manage to find a Japanese formation early on 24 October 1944. At 03:49 that morning, Besugo closed a Japanese tanker, protected by two coast defense frigates and a destroyer, intending to sneak between two of the escorts for a shot at the tanker. However, two rapid Japanese zigzags away put the tanker out of reach, so Besugo turned on the port-quarter escort instead. She fired three torpedoes at the escort, the frigate Coast Defense Vessel No. 132, and, at 04:15, at least one torpedo hit the target. In a blinding flash, the frigate suddenly blew up, illuminating the entire area and silhouetting Besugo on the surface. She crash-dived, expecting to be depth-charged by the rear escort, but no counterattack attack materialized.

Over the next week, Besugo and up to six other U.S. submarines patrolled the approaches to Van Diemen Strait (also known as Ōsumi Strait) and the east coast of Kyushu, hoping to catch some of the Japanese warships retiring north from their defeat in the waters around the Philippine Islands in the Battle of Leyte Gulf. The only things Besugo spotted were three Japanese patrol planes, a Japanese submarine′s periscope, and a drifting contact mine, all of which she evaded with some difficulty. Retiring to the Mariana Islands on 1 November 1944, Besugo concluded her patrol by mooring alongside the submarine tender USS Fulton (AS-11) at Saipan on 5 November 1944.

===== Second war patrol =====
Following minor repairs and a torpedo reload, Besugo departed Tanapag Harbor at Saipan to begin her second war patrol on 10 November 1944. Transiting the Luzon Strait on 16 November 1944, she entered the South China Sea, and she took up a position off Linapacan Island in the Philippine Islands on 20 November. At 04:55 on 22 November, Besugo picked up a radar contact while operating off the northern tip of Palawan. Owing to the approaching dawn, she attacked the target quickly, firing four torpedoes at what she believed was a Japanese tanker. One torpedo hit amidships, starting an enormous fire that eventually sank what turned out to be the Japanese landing ship T.151. A few minutes later, she spotted a 300-foot (91 m) barge nearby, probably a tow abandoned by the stricken landing ship, and sank it with two torpedoes.

Returning to her patrol station that evening, Besugo encountered rough weather, and the heavy swells interfered with her surface search radar. At 21:38, she closed her only good contact and fired four bow torpedoes at a large vessel. All missed, possibly because they grounded in the shallow water. Over the next 10 minutes, she fired eight more torpedoes, one of which finally hit and brought to a stop what turned out to be a cargo ship. Besugo then fired her last four torpedoes into the target. Two of them demolished the midships section and the ship settled to the bottom in 6 fathoms (36 ft; 11 m) of water, leaving the superstructure still visible above the surface. A postwar records review, however, did not indicate any Japanese losses in that area, and Besugo did not receive credit for a sinking. With her torpedoes gone, Besugo headed south, passed through the Lombok Strait, and arrived at Fremantle, Australia, on 4 December 1944, bringing her patrol to an end.

===== Third war patrol =====
After a refit alongside the submarine tender USS Anthedon (AS-24), Besugo got underway for her third war patrol on 24 December 1944. She passed through Lombok Strait late on 30 December and entered the Celebes Sea. On 31 December 1944 she sighted a small Japanese merchant ship emerging from a rain squall. Besugo dove and attacked with three torpedoes, but all missed, and the target escaped and disappeared from view. It probably radioed in a contact report, because searching Japanese aircraft later forced Besugo to submerge four times.

Clearing Karimata Strait on 2 January 1945, Besugo took up a patrol station off the southern tip of Japanese-occupied French Indochina on 4 January. At 18:40 on 6 January, her lookouts sighted the heavily laden Japanese 10,020-gross register ton tanker Nichei Maru escorted by a destroyer and two coast defense frigates. She closed undetected and at 21:18 fired six torpedoes at Nichei Maru. Three of the torpedoes hit home, and Nichei Maru burst into flame and sank. As Besugo cleared the area, the escorts dropped seven depth charges in desultory and ineffective attacks.

Joined by the submarines USS Hardhead (SS-365), USS Cobia (SS-245), and later USS Blackfin (SS-322), Besugo spent the next two weeks fruitlessly patrolling a scouting line south of the Cà Mau Peninsula. Finally, at 05:30 on 24 January 1945, she received a contact report from Blackfin. As Besugo closed the three Japanese ships (destroyer Shigure, the tanker Sarawak Maru, and a small minesweeper) Blackfin reported, her crew heard Blackfin send one torpedo into the tanker. Shortly thereafter, the Japanese escorts drove Besugo off with gunfire and depth charges. Twenty minutes later, Besugo tried approaching again and, despite sonar searches and a close depth-charge attack by the escorts, she fired six torpedoes at the tanker. The torpedo tracks attracted the attention of the escorts, and Besugo endured a furious pounding from the two escorts, who dropped a total of 22 depth charges over the next half hour. Later that afternoon, Besugo′s crew heard Japanese escorts drop another 32 depth charges. A postwar records review determined the tanker to have been damaged in the attack.

A week later, Besugo discovered four Japanese antisubmarine warfare vessels conducting a sound sweep off Cape Laguan on the Malay Peninsula. After calling in Blackfin and Hardhead for help, Besugo crept under the right-flank ship and took up a firing position. At 02:27 on 2 February 1945, she fired four torpedoes at the right-center ship, and one of them hit and sank the frigate Coast Defense Vessel No. 144. Besugo easily evaded the ensuing counterattack and withdrew from the area. As no further contacts developed, she set a course for Australia on 5 February 1945, transited Lombok Strait on 8 February, and moored alongside the submarine tender USS Euryale (AS-22) in the harbor at Fremantle on 15 February 1945.

===== Fourth war patrol =====
As the port at Fremantle was very busy, Besugo′s refit was delayed for two weeks, and she was not ready for operations until 24 March 1945. Underway that same day to begin her fourth war patrol, Besugo proceeded to a patrol area in the eastern Java Sea. Passing through Lombok Strait on 31 March, she joined the submarines Gabilan and USS Charr (SS-328) and took up a position near Bangka Island off Sumatra on 3 April 1945.

On 4 April 1945, while patrolling submerged, Besugo contacted an enemy group consisting of a cruiser, three torpedo boats, and a minesweeper. After they passed over the horizon, she surfaced, radioed a contact report, and set out in pursuit of the Japanese force. During the afternoon and evening, she tried to work around the Japanese task group, but Japanese aircraft forced her to dive four times. Finally, at 03:58 on 5 April, after a long night of maneuvering, she fired six torpedoes at the cruiser, but all of them missed. A nearby escort then forced Besugo to dive and dropped 13 depth charges in the area before Besugo escaped.

Later on the morning of 5 April 1945, Besugo received orders to patrol the Sumba Strait while Allied aircraft from Australia attempted to sink the elusive Japanese task group. Besugo′s crew hoped that at the very least, the air attacks might force the Japanese warships to retire past Besugo′s position, and on 6 April 1945 sighted the Japanese ships doing exactly that. Unfortunately for Besugo, the cruiser's high speed and haze gray camouflage allowed her to surprise Besugo, quickly slipping by her and evading all nine torpedoes Besugo fired hastily.

Despite the appearance of Japanese patrol planes, Besugo was better prepared for the trailing Japanese escorts, and she blew the minesweeper W.12 in half with one of four torpedoes fired. Although W.12′s bow sank immediately, her stern remained afloat in a sea filled with Japanese sailors abandoning ship. Before Besugo could fire a torpedo at W.12′s stern section, a sudden attack by a Japanese patrol plane forced Besugo to break off the attack and dive to safety. Besugo spent the next two hours dodging Japanese air attacks; she was bombed once and strafed twice, before finally sinking W.12′s stern section with her last torpedo.

Besugo then returned to Fremantle on 11 April 1945 for another load of torpedoes, before putting to sea on 16 April to continue her patrol. Transiting Lombok Strait on 21 April, she took up a patrol station in the Java Sea in company with the submarines USS Blower (SS-325) and USS Perch (SS-313). On 23 April, she spotted unusual prey, the German submarine U-183 painted with Japanese colors, and sank her with a torpedo at 04°57′S 112°52′E, becoming one of only a very few American submarines to sink a German warship. Quickly surfacing, Besugo recovered U-183′s only survivor, a badly wounded German warrant officer.

Besugo sighted nothing of interest again until 28 April 1945, when she began tracking a Japanese guard boat. Surfacing at 02:20 on 29 April, she quickly sank Otome Maru with 5-inch (127 mm) gunfire. On the evening of 29 April, after closing with an immense pillar of fire spotted over the horizon, Besugo rescued a badly burned sailor, most likely from the Imperial Japanese Army tanker Yuno Maru, recently sunk by a mine. From then until 12 May 1945, Besugo patrolled off Java between Surabaya and Batavia, scouting for any Japanese warships responding to the Allied landings on Borneo. After swinging through the Gulf of Siam, Besugo concluded her patrol, arriving at Subic Bay on Luzon in the Philippine Islands on 20 May 1945.

===== Fifth war patrol =====
Following a refit alongside Anthedon, Besugo got underway for her fifth war patrol on 13 June 1945. proceeding southeast to French Indochina, Besugo spent close to three uneventful weeks on a lifeguard station off Camranh Bay in support of Allied airstrikes. Then, on 5 July 1945, she moved to the south coast of Borneo but again made no contacts with Japanese ships. After transiting Lombok Strait, she arrived at Fremantle on 25 July 1945 and received a refit alongside the submarine tender USS Clytie (AS-26). Besugo was at Fremantle when hostilities with Japan ended on 15 August 1945, bringing World War II to an end.

==== Post-World War II ====
===== 1946–1949 =====
Besugo departed Fremantle on 29 August 1945, when she proceed south and east to Sydney, Australia, which she reached on 5 September 1945. She got back underway on 7 September 1945 to proceed to San Diego, California, where she arrived on 26 September 1945. She had an extended period of shore leave and upkeep at San Diego, she proceeded to Vallejo, California, where on 31 October 1945 she entered the Mare Island Navy Yard (renamed the Mare Island Naval Shipyard in November 1945 — on Mare Island for an overhaul.

Upon completion of her overhaul on 8 February 1946, Besugo headed to Pearl Harbor for duty with the United States Pacific Fleet. She made a cruise to Guam in the Mariana Islands. then returned to Pearl Harbor on 6 May 1946. She then operated locally in Hawaiian waters, included training at the French Frigate Shoals in the Northwestern Hawaiian Islands in December 1946 and a simulated attack exercise against the light cruiser USS Oakland (CL-95) in January 1947. Between 3 February and 5 May 1947, she received another overhaul at Mare Island Naval Shipyard before returning to Pearl Harbor on 13 May 1947.

With the Cold War beginning amid growing tensions between the United States and the Soviet Union, the U.S. Navy began planning for possible confrontations with the Soviet Navy. One training measure, devised to give submarine crews experience was the "simulated war patrol," a mission upon which Besugo embarked on 7 June 1947. Heading west from Hawaii, she avoided numerous air and surface contacts in an attempt to avoid detection by U.S. forces en route to the Marshall Islands. Arriving off Majuro Atoll on 18 June 1947, she conducted a photographic reconnaissance of the area before heading on to the Philippines. After a stop at Subic Bay from 4 to 7 July 1947, where she provided target services to Martin PBM Mariner and Consolidated PB4Y-2 Privateer patrol aircraft of Fleet Air Wing 1, proceeded to Hong Kong on 8 July. There, the crew enjoyed shore leave under the "care" of the British light cruiser HMS Belfast. Besugo moved on to Qingdao, China, where she arrived on 18 July 1947 and began a six-week series of exercises with United States Seventh Fleet units in the Yellow Sea. These included radar tracking drills with the submarine USS Entemedor (SS-340), salvage drills with the submarine rescue vessel USS Bluebird (ASR-19), and, in company with the submarine USS Catfish (SS-339), a simulated attack exercise against a task force. During the latter, aircraft contacts plagued the two submarines, which failed to make any successful attacks. After stops to refuel at Okinawa and Midway Atoll, Besugo arrived at Pearl Harbor on 21 September 1947.

Besugo remained in Hawaiian waters until July 1948, conducting routine upkeep and local training operations. Then, following a visit to Hilo, Hawaii, from 3 and 8 July 1948, she got underway on 9 July 1948 for a reconnaissance mission to the Bering Sea. Arriving at Adak in the Aleutian Islands on 16 July 1948, she headed east and rendezvoused with the submarine USS Diodon (SS-349) on 18 July. After exchanging information with Diodon, Besugo moved to St. Lawrence Island on 19 July and began three weeks of photo reconnaissance operations off Cape Navarin on the coast of the Soviet Union at the southern extremity of the Gulf of Anadyr. During this time, she sighted three Soviet warships — a destroyer escort, a patrol frigate, and a minesweeper — and six cargo ships, all without being detected. After a rendezvous with the submarine Blower on 10 August 1948, Besugo proceeded to Adak and Kodiak, Alaska, before returning to Pearl Harbor on 20 July 1948. She remained in Hawaiian waters for the next 18 months, conducting independent ship's drills, antisubmarine warfare exercises, and other local operations from Pearl Harbor.

===== 1950–1958 =====
Despite the outbreak of the Korean War on 25 June 1950, Besugo entered the Pearl Harbor Naval Shipyard for an overhaul not long thereafter. Completing the overhaul on 28 September 1950, she departed Pearl Harbor on 19 October 1950 bound for Yokosuka, Japan, which she reached on 31 October 1950. After four weeks of training, including target services for U.S. antisubmarine warfare planes and warships, she began the first of her two Korean War reconnaissance patrols. Leaving Japan on 6 December 1950, she passed through the Tsugaru Strait and took up a patrol station off La Perouse Strait north of Hokkaido on 9 December. There, in spite of rough seas and a succession of snowstorms, she spent two weeks tracking Soviet shipping moving between the Sea of Okhotsk and the Sea of Japan. Returning to Yokosuka in late December 1950, she remained in Japanese waters for the next three months, conducting local operations and twice visiting Okinawa. During her first visit to Okinawa, she proceeded to Naze Ko on Omami o Shima on 12 January 1951 to rescue six survivors of a PBM Mariner flying boat that had crashed. Departing the Far East on 11 April 1951, she returned to Pearl Harbor on 22 April 1951.

Following nine months of local operations in Hawaiian waters and two shipyard periods, during which new sonar equipment and mine clearing cables were installed, Besugo got underway from Pearl Harbor on 7 January 1952 bound for Subic Bay in the Philippines. Arriving there on 24 January 1952, Besugo embarked on her second special mission the following day. Ordered to conduct a photographic reconnaissance of Hainan Island, she took up a submerged patrol station off Yulin Bay on 28 January 1952. Frequent contacts with fishing sampans, and even with entire fishing fleets on a half-dozen occasions, made surveillance and photographic operations very difficult. In addition, the sampans constituted an even greater hazard at night, since they had no running lights and registered poorly on radar. As a result, the mission produced limited results. Besugo returned to Subic Bay on 28 February 1952, and then to Pearl Harbor in March 1952, after which Besugo′s crew received a two-month leave and upkeep period.

After the two-month leave-and-upkeep period, Besugo entered the Pearl Harbor Naval Shipyard for a three-month overhaul in July 1952. The shipyard work was complete in September 1952, but a small electrical fire on 23 October 1952 delayed her return to service until December 1952. Departing Pearl Harbor on 31 January 1953, she headed northeast for a visit to Puget Sound, Washington, and its environs. Between 9 February and 22 March 1953, she visited Esquimalt, British Columbia, Canada, and Seattle, Washington, before conducting a training exercise off Cape Flattery, Washington. She returned to Pearl Harbor on 29 March 1953, and her only other movement later in the spring of 1953 was a mid-May visit in Hawaiian waters to Nawiliwili Bay on Kauai.

Assigned to training duty for United States Naval Reserve personnel, Besugo departed Pearl Harbor on 2 August 1953 and arrived at her new home port of San Diego, California, on 9 August. She conducted local operations in nearby waters for the next five years, including the provision of target services to local fleet units, and made occasional operational and Naval Reserve training cruises. Her first training cruise took place in the autumn of 1954, when she proceeded from San Diego to Lahaina Roads in Hawaii and laid a drill minefield on 21 October 1954.

In the autumn of 1955, Besugo visited the Puget Sound area again for antisubmarine warfare exercises with Royal Canadian Navy warships and a U.S. Naval Reserve training cruise. She received an overhaul in San Francisco, California, during the spring of 1956. In January 1957, in company with the submarine USS Remora (SS-487), she made a cruise sto Mexico which included a port visit at Mazatlan. She carried out Naval Reserve reserve training duties in Puget Sound in February 1957. In August 1957, she proceeded to San Francisco for antisubmarine warfare exercises, and in November 1957 she again visited Mazatlan.

===== 1958–1966 =====
Never having been modernized, Besugo was scheduled for inactivation in 1958. She departed San Diego for the last time on 6 January 1958 and entered the Mare Island Naval Shipyard to commence deactivation procedures on 8 January 1958. She was decommissioned on 21 March 1958 and laid up in the Pacific Reserve Fleet. While in reserve, she was reclsassified an "auxiliary research submarine" and given the hull classification symbol AGSS-321 in 1962.

Besugo was recommissioned on 15 June 1965. She was converted to a Fleet Snorkel submarine in 1966.

=== Italian Navy ===
After the completion of her Fleet Snorkel conversion, Besugo was decommissioned on 31 March 1966 and transferred on loan to Italy the same day. The Italian Navy commissioned her as Francesco Morosini (S 508), named for Francesco Morosini (1619–1694), who was Doge of Venice from 1688 to 1694.

The Italian Navy decommissioned Francesco Morosini on 30 November 1973. It struck her from its naval vessel register on 15 November 1975 and returned her to U.S. Navy custody on the same day.

== Disposal ==
The submarine was struck from the U.S. Naval Vessel Register on 15 November 1975, the day Italy returned her to the United States. She was sold either on 16 April 1976 or 20 June 1977 (according to different sources) for scrapping.

== Honors and awards ==
- Combat Action Ribbon
- Asiatic-Pacific Campaign Medal with four battle stars for World War II service
- World War II Victory Medal
- Navy Occupation Service Medal with "ASIA" clasp
- China Service Medal
- National Defense Service Medal with star
- Korean Service Medal with one battle star for Korean War service
- Republic of Korea Presidential Unit Citation (Republic of Korea)
- United Nations Korea Medal (United Nations)
- Korean War Service Medal (Republic of Korea)
