= I-351-class submarine =

Japanese submarine class

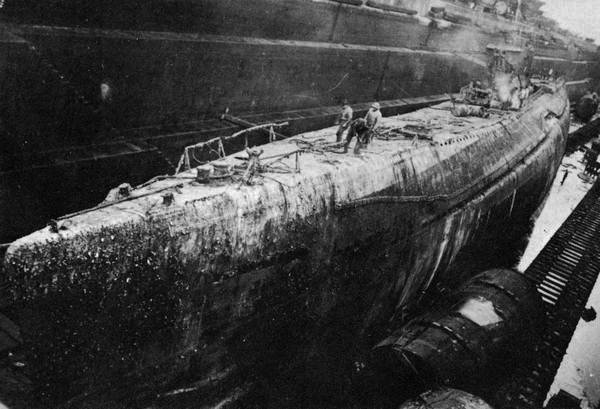
- I-352 on 23 January 1948

Class overview
- Name: I-351-class submarine
- Builders: Kure Naval Arsenal
- Operators: Imperial Japanese Navy
- Built: 1943–1945
- In commission: 1945
- Planned: 6
- Completed: 1
- Canceled: 4
- Lost: 2

General characteristics
- Type: Tanker/transport submarine
- Displacement: 3,512 long tons (3,568 t) surfaced; 4,290 long tons (4,359 t) submerged
- Length: 111.00 m (364 ft 2 in) (overall)
- Beam: 10.2 m (33 ft 6 in)
- Draft: 6.1 m (20 ft 0 in)
- Installed power: 2 × diesel engines (3,700 bhp (2,800 kW)); 2 × electric motors (1,200 shp (890 kW))
- Propulsion: 2 × propeller shafts; Diesel-electric
- Speed: 15.75 knots (29.17 km/h; 18.12 mph) (surfaced); 6.3 knots (11.7 km/h; 7.2 mph) (submerged)
- Range: 13,000 nmi (24,000 km; 15,000 mi) at 14 knots (26 km/h; 16 mph) (surfaced); 100 nmi (190 km; 120 mi) at 3 knots (5.6 km/h; 3.5 mph) (submerged)
- Test depth: 90 m (300 ft)
- Complement: 77 + 13 aircrew
- Armament: 4 × bow 21-inch (533 mm) torpedo tubes; (4 torpedoes); 3 × 81 mm (3.2 in) Type 3 mortars; 7 × 25 mm (1 in) Type 96 AA guns

The I-351-class submarine (伊三百五十一型潜水艦, I-san-byaku-go-jū-ichi-gata sensuikan) was a class of tanker/transport submarines built for the Imperial Japanese Navy (IJN) during World War II. The IJN called this type of submarine Senho type submarine (潜補型潜水艦, Sen-Ho-gata sensuikan). The type name, was shortened to Hokyū Sensuikan (補給潜水艦, Submarine Tanker). The IJN designed these submarines to support flying boats in forward areas. By the time the first submarine was finished, this capability was no longer needed and she was converted into a tanker. That boat, I-351, was sunk on the return leg of her second voyage in 1945; the second boat, I-352, was destroyed by an American air raid before she was completed. Four additional submarines were planned, but were cancelled before they were laid down.

== Design and description ==
The I-351-class submarines were ordered under the 5th Fleet Replenishment Program of 1942 to support IJN flying boats in areas where there were no shore facilities and seaplane tenders could not operate. They were designed to support up to three flying boats with fuel, ammunition, water and even replacement aircrew.

These submarines had a length of 111 meters (364 ft 2 in) overall, a beam of 10.2 meters (33 ft 6 in) and a draft of 6.1 meters (20 ft 0 in). They displaced 3,512 long tons (3,568 t) on the surface and 4,290 long tons (4,360 t) submerged. They had a diving depth of 90 meters (300 ft) and a crew of 77 officers and enlisted men plus accommodations for 13 aircrew.

The boats had two propellers, each of which was driven by a 1,850-brake-horsepower (1,380 kW) diesel engine as well as a 600-shaft-horsepower (447 kW) electric motor. This arrangement gave the I-351-class submarines a maximum speed of 15.75 knots (29.17 km/h; 18.12 mph) while surfaced and 6.3 knots (11.7 km/h; 7.2 mph) submerged. They had a range of 13,000 nautical miles (24,000 km; 15,000 mi) at 14 knots (26 km/h; 16 mph) while on the surface and 100 nmi (190 km; 120 mi) at 3 knots (5.6 km/h; 3.5 mph) while submerged. This gave them an endurance of 60 days.

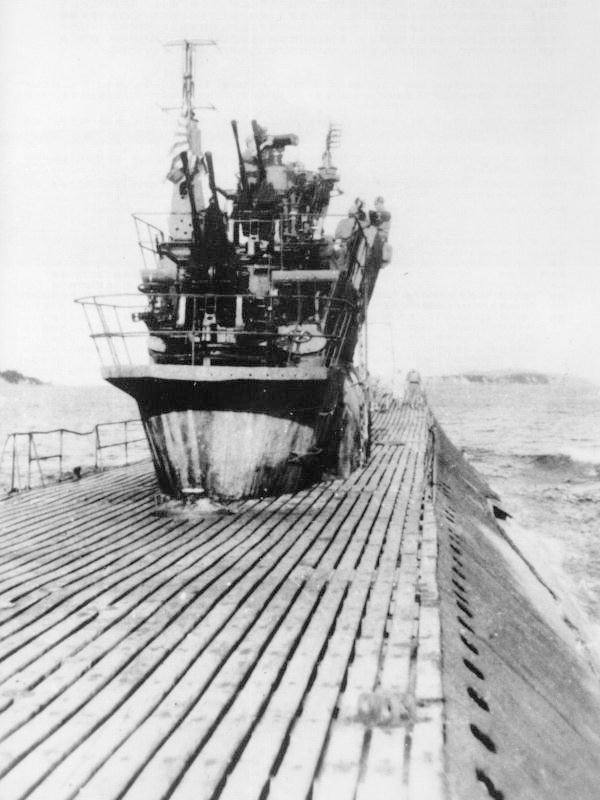
I-351's conning tower, 1945

The boats were equipped with four 21-inch (533 mm) torpedo tubes in the bow and they carried four torpedoes. For surface combat they were designed to carry one 14-centimeter (5.5 in) deck gun, but this was unavailable when the submarines were under construction and three 81-millimeter (3.2 in) Type 3 mortars were substituted. The submarines were fitted with seven 25 mm Type 96 anti-aircraft guns, in two twin and three single mounts.

The I-351-class submarines were initially equipped to carry 365 long tons (371 t) of aviation gasoline, 11 long tons (11 t) of fresh water, and either sixty 550-pound (250 kg) bombs or 30 bombs and 15 aircraft torpedoes. Four of the torpedoes could be replaced by an equal number of reload torpedoes for the submarine.

== Boats ==
Boat #	Name	Builder	Launched	Completed	Fate
655	I-351	Kure Naval Arsenal	24 February 1944	28 January 1945	Sunk by USS Bluefish, 14 July 1945
656	I-352	Kure Naval Arsenal	23 April 1944		Sunk in air raid, 22 June 1945
657	I-353	Kure Naval Arsenal			Cancelled, 1943
730, 731, 732					Cancelled, 1942

== Construction and service ==
Only I-351 and I-352 were actually laid down, the other four submarines were cancelled before their keels were laid.

I-351 was modified before completion into an oil tanker. The boat made one round trip from Singapore, carrying 132,000 US gallons (500,000 L; 110,000 imp gal) of aviation fuel, and was sunk on the return leg of her second trip in the South China Sea at coordinates 04°30′N 110°00′E by the American submarine Bluefish on 14 July 1945. I-352 was 90 percent complete when she was destroyed during an air raid by Boeing B-29 heavy bombers on 22 July.

== Books ==
- Carpenter, Dorr; Polmar, Norman (1986). Submarines of the Imperial Japanese Navy 1904–1945. London: Conway Maritime Press. ISBN 0-85177-396-6.
- Jentschura, Hansgeorg; Jung, Dieter; Mickel, Peter (1977). Warships of the Imperial Japanese Navy, 1869–1945. Annapolis, Maryland: United States Naval Institute. ISBN 0-87021-893-X.
- Stille, Mark (2007). Imperial Japanese Navy Submarines 1941-45. New Vanguard. Vol. 135. Botley, Oxford, UK: Osprey Publishing. ISBN 978-1-84603-090-1.
