= Japanese submarine I-351 =

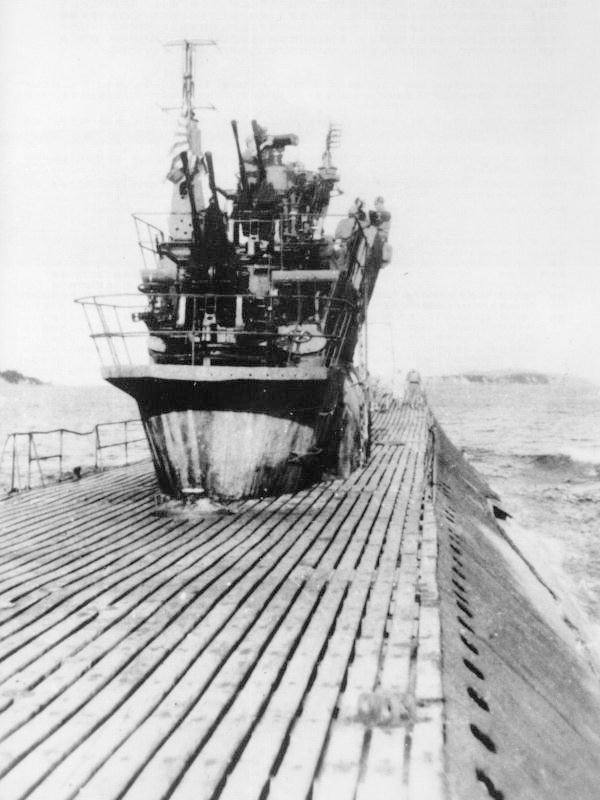
- I-351 in 1945.

History

Japan
- Name: Submarine No. 655
- Builder: Kure Naval Arsenal, Kure, Japan
- Laid down: 1 May 1943
- Renamed: I-361 on 22 December 1943
- Launched: 24 February 1944
- Completed: 28 January 1945
- Commissioned: 28 January 1945
- Fate: Sunk, 15 July 1945
- Stricken: 15 September 1945

General characteristics
- Class & type: Senho Type submarine
- Displacement: 3,512 long tons (3,568 t) surfaced; 4,290 long tons (4,359 t) submerged
- Length: 111.00 m (364 ft 2 in) overall
- Beam: 10.2 m (33 ft 6 in)
- Draft: 6.1 m (20 ft 0 in)
- Propulsion: 2 × diesel engines (3,700 bhp (2,800 kW)); 2 × electric motors (1,200 shp (890 kW)); 2 shafts
- Speed: 15.75 knots (29.17 km/h; 18.12 mph) (surfaced); 6.3 knots (11.7 km/h; 7.2 mph) (submerged)
- Range: 13,000 nmi (24,000 km; 15,000 mi) at 14 knots (26 km/h; 16 mph) (surfaced); 100 nmi (190 km; 120 mi) at 3 knots (5.6 km/h; 3.5 mph) (submerged)
- Test depth: 90 m (300 ft)
- Complement: 77 + 13 aircrew
- Armament: 4 × bow 21-inch (533 mm) torpedo tubes; (4 torpedoes); 3 × 81 mm (3.2 in) Type 3 mortars; 7 × 25 mm (1 in) Type 96 AA guns

I-351 was an I-351-class (Senho type submarine (潜補型潜水艦, Sen-Ho-gata sensuikan) tanker/transport submarine built for the Imperial Japanese Navy during World War II. Originally designed to support flying boats in forward areas, she was converted into a tanker. The only submarine of her class to be completed, she was commissioned in late January 1945 and was sunk on the return leg of her second voyage in July 1945.

== Construction and commissioning ==
I-351 was laid down on 1 May 1943 by the Kure Naval Arsenal at Kure, Japan, with the name Submarine No. 655. She was renamed I-351 on 22 December 1943 and provisionally attached to the Kure Naval District that day. She was launched on 24 February 1944 and was attached formally to the Kure Naval District that day. She was completed and commissioned on 28 January 1945.

== Service history ==
=== January–April 1945 ===
Upon commissioning, I-351 was assigned to Submarine Squadron 11 for workups. Between late January and early April 1945, she conducted workups in the Iyo-nada in the Seto Inland Sea. Originally equipped with a Type 22 surface search radar and an E27 Type 3 radar detector, she also had a Type 13 air search radar installed after testing. She was assigned to Submarine Division 15 in the 6th Fleet on 4 April 1945, and continued training in the Seto Inland Sea until mid-April.

=== Transport missions ===
On 1 May 1945, I-351 departed Kure bound for Singapore on her first transport mission, carrying a cargo of aircraft parts, ammunition, and clothing. She arrived at Singapore on 15 May 1945.

On 18 May 1945, Fleet Radio Unit, Melbourne (FRUMEL), an Allied signals intelligence unit in Melbourne, Australia, reported that it had decrypted a message reporting I-351's arrival at Singapore, that she had entered drydock on 17 May 1945, and that she planned to change ballast, leave drydock on 20 May, load a cargo of aviation gasoline, and depart Singapore on 21 May. She actually departed Singapore on 20 May, carrying 132,000 US gallons (500,000 L; 110,000 imp gal) of aviation gasoline. FRUMEL reported on 31 May that she planned to be at position 31°00′N 126°00′E on 2 June and arrive at Sasebo, Japan, on 3 June 1945. Despite this Allied awareness of her activities, she arrived safely at Sasebo on 3 June. Most of the aviation gasoline she delivered was used for kamikaze operations, and 6th Fleet commander Vice Admiral Tadashige Daigo received a special commendation for her successful mission from the Commander-in-Chief of the Combined Fleet, Vice Admiral Jisaburo Ozawa.

While I-351 was at Sasebo, FRUMEL reported on 14 June 1945 that she was scheduled to depart on or about 19 June for another voyage to Singapore, carrying a cargo of ammunition and cryptographic publications. She actually got underway for Singapore at 14:00 on 22 June, carrying 60 boxes of code books for the 10th Area Fleet and personnel slated to command the submarines I-501 and I-502. Allied Ultra intelligence accurately reported her departure that day, adding that she might be off the coast of China at 28 degrees 20 minutes North at 12:00 on 25 June 1945. At 17:45 on 26 June, the United States Navy submarine USS Dentuda, under the command of Lieutenant Commander John S. McCain Jr., detected high-speed screws at the northern end of the Formosa Strait and at 17:27 identified the vessel by periscope observation as an "I-class submarine" proceeding on the surface at an estimated speed of 16 knots (30 km/h; 18 mph). Dentuda fired four Mark 18 torpedoes at the submarine from her stern torpedo tubes at 17:30 at 24°54′N 119°50′E, but all four missed, and Dentuda noted that the submarine showed no sign of her crew realizing that she was under attack. Dentuda pursued the submarine, but lost contact with it in the Formosa Strait at 23:30 at 25°53′N 120°22′E. Commander-in-Chief, United States Pacific Fleet analysts concluded that the submarine Dentuda attacked was I-351.

Later in her voyage to Singapore, I-351′s air search radar broke down on 5 July 1945, but she arrived at Singapore without further incident on 6 July. At Singapore, I-351 loaded 132,000 US gallons (500,000 L; 110,000 imp gal) of aviation gasoline and was drydocked from 7 to 10 July 1945. After embarking 42 aviators from the 936th Kōkūtai — an Imperial Japanese Navy Air Service antisubmarine warfare and convoy escort unit of the 13th Air Fleet — for transportation to Japan, she departed Singapore bound for Sasebo on 11 July 1945.

=== Loss ===
On 14 July 1945, I-351 was proceeding northeast on the surface in the South China Sea east-northeast of Natuna Besar and northwest of Borneo, zig-zagging on base course 035 at 14 knots (26 km/h; 16 mph), when the U.S. Navy submarine USS Blower, also on the surface, detected her on radar at 23:56. Blower then detected pulses from I-351′s radar at 00:30 on 15 July 1945 and submerged to attempt an attack. At 02:15, Blower fired four Mark 18-2 torpedoes in two spreads at 05°36′N 109°37′E. The first two torpedoes hit I-351 but did not explode, and the second spread of two missed. I-351 submerged and broke contact with Blower, but Blower radioed the nearby submarine USS Bluefish to alert her to I-351's presence.

I-351 surfaced to continue her voyage. At 03:14 on 15 July 1945, Bluefish detected her on radar 100 nautical miles (190 km; 120 mi) east-northeast of Natuna Besar. At 04:11, Bluefish fired four Mark 14-3 torpedoes at I-351 at a range of 1,850 yards (1,690 m). Two of them hit, and I-351 exploded, broke in two, and sank by the stern at 04°30′N 110°00′E. On the morning of 15 July 1945, Bluefish picked up three survivors from the water, all lookouts from I-351. They identified their submarine as I-351 to Bluefish's crew and reported that I-351 had been making 10 knots (19 km/h; 12 mph) when they sighted Bluefish's torpedoes. One of the torpedoes passed ahead, one missed astern, one hit I-351 amidships, and one hit her in the stern. They said that one of the torpedoes struck I-351 in her aviation gasoline tank, causing a huge explosion which knocked them unconscious and blew them overboard. They said they had regained consciousness in the water and been in the water for about four hours when Bluefish rescued them.

The three lookouts were I-351's only survivors, and a total of 110 men — the other 68 members of her crew and all 42 aviators aboard as passengers — died in her sinking. On 31 July 1945, the Imperial Japanese Navy declared I-351 to be presumed lost with all hands in the South China Sea. She was stricken from the Navy list on 15 September 1945.
